= 3 ft gauge railroads in the United States =

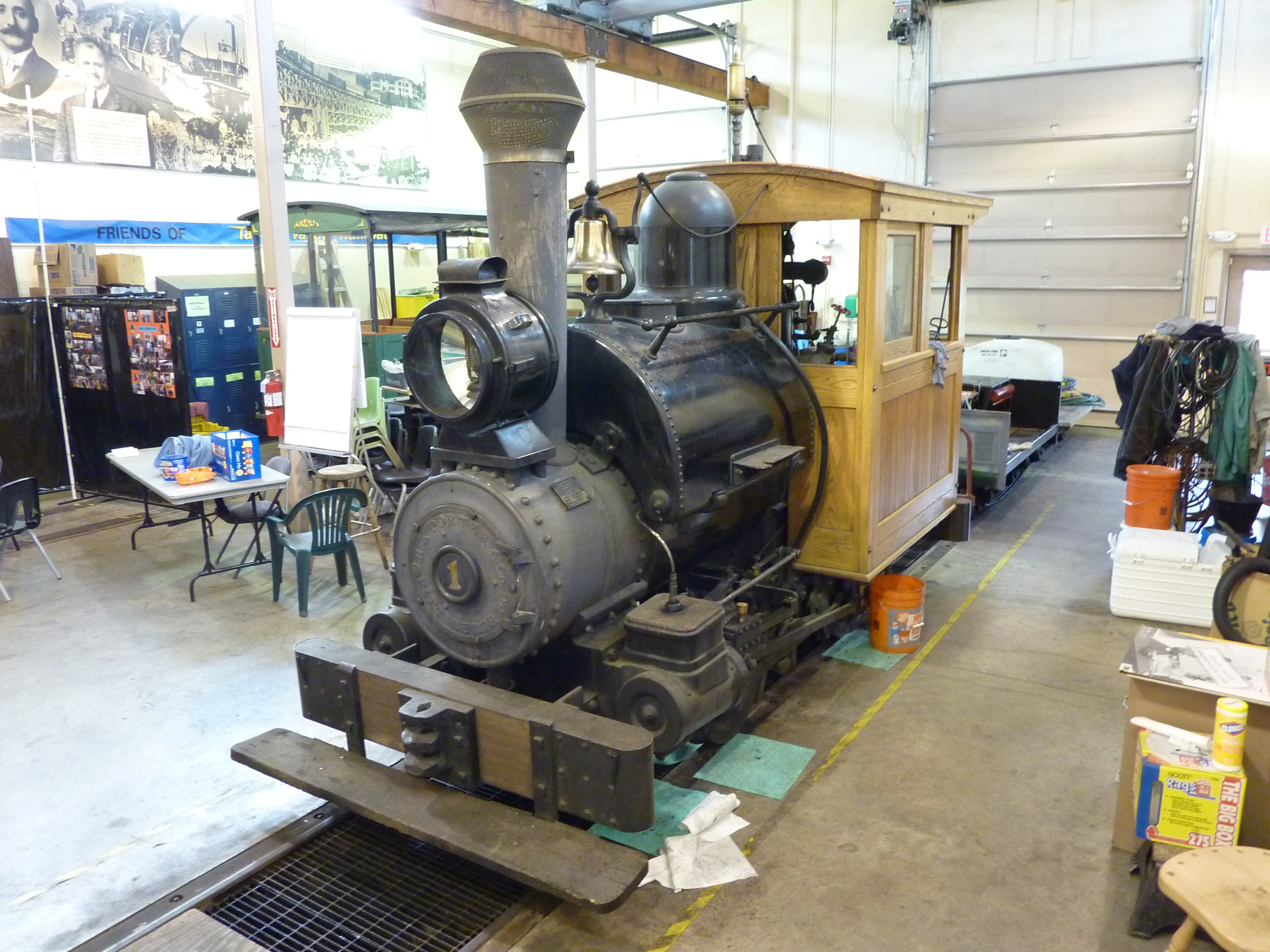
Engine No. 1 of the Crooked Creek & Whiskey Island Railroad in Pioneer Park was built in 1899 and is the oldest working locomotive in Alaska.

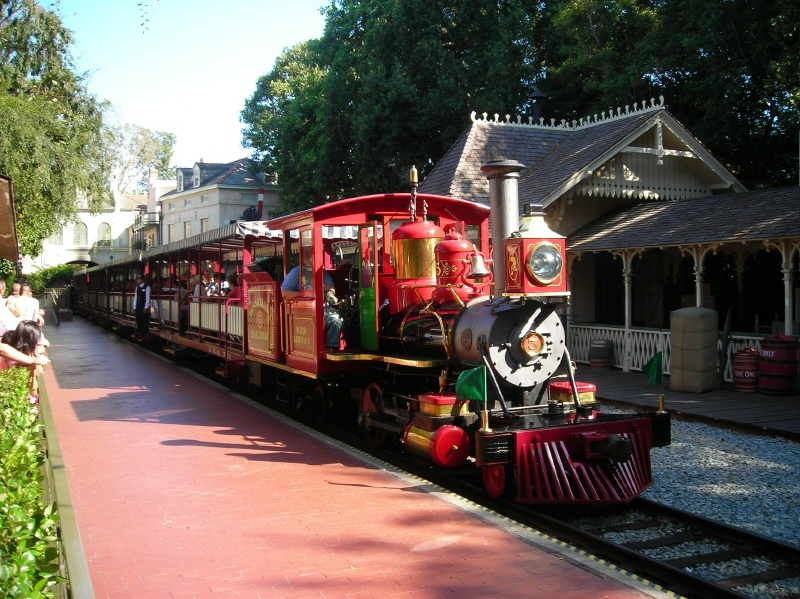
The Ward Kimball locomotive of the Disneyland Railroad.

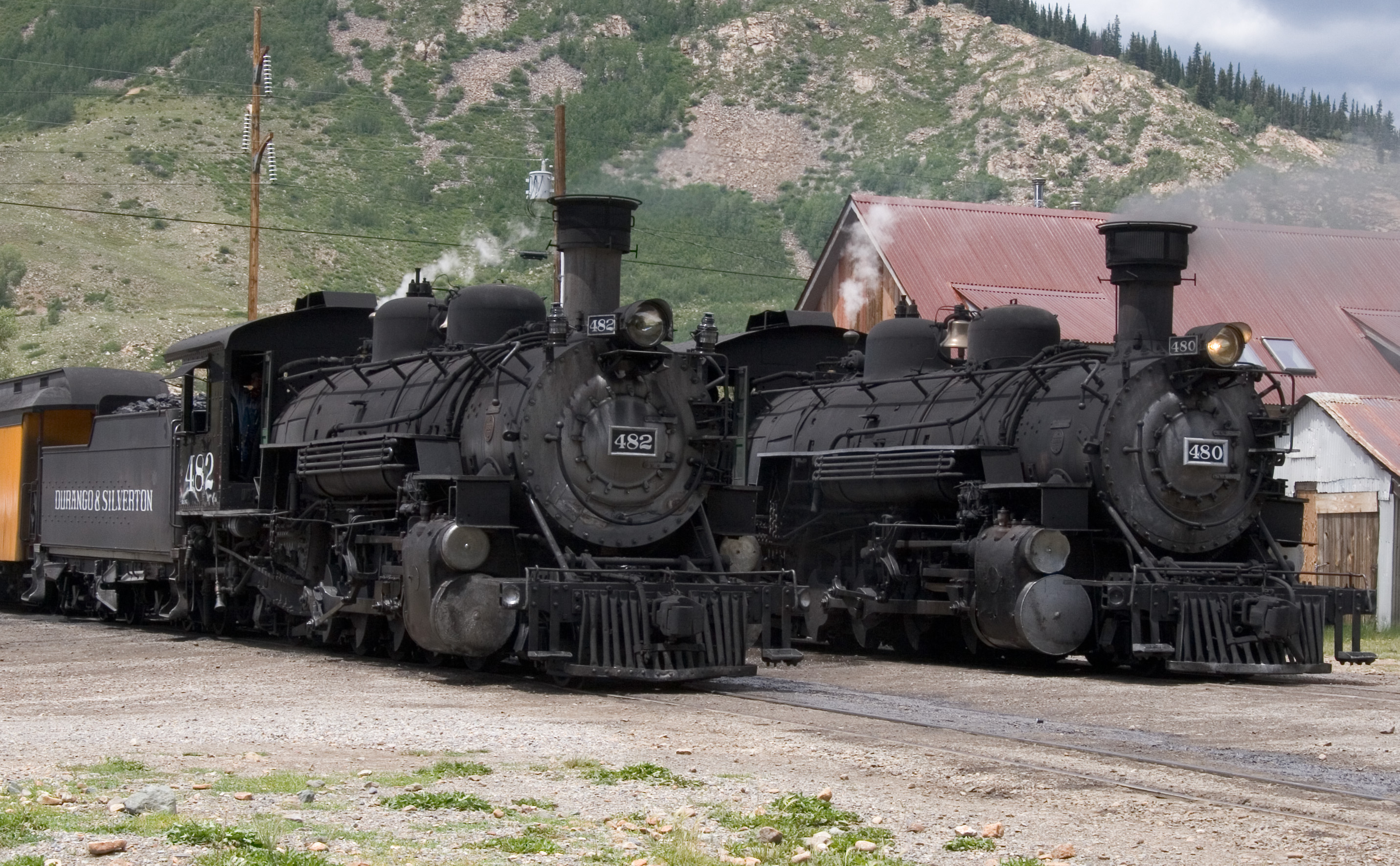
A pair of steam locomotives on the Durango and Silverton Narrow Gauge Railroad in the Colorado Rockies.

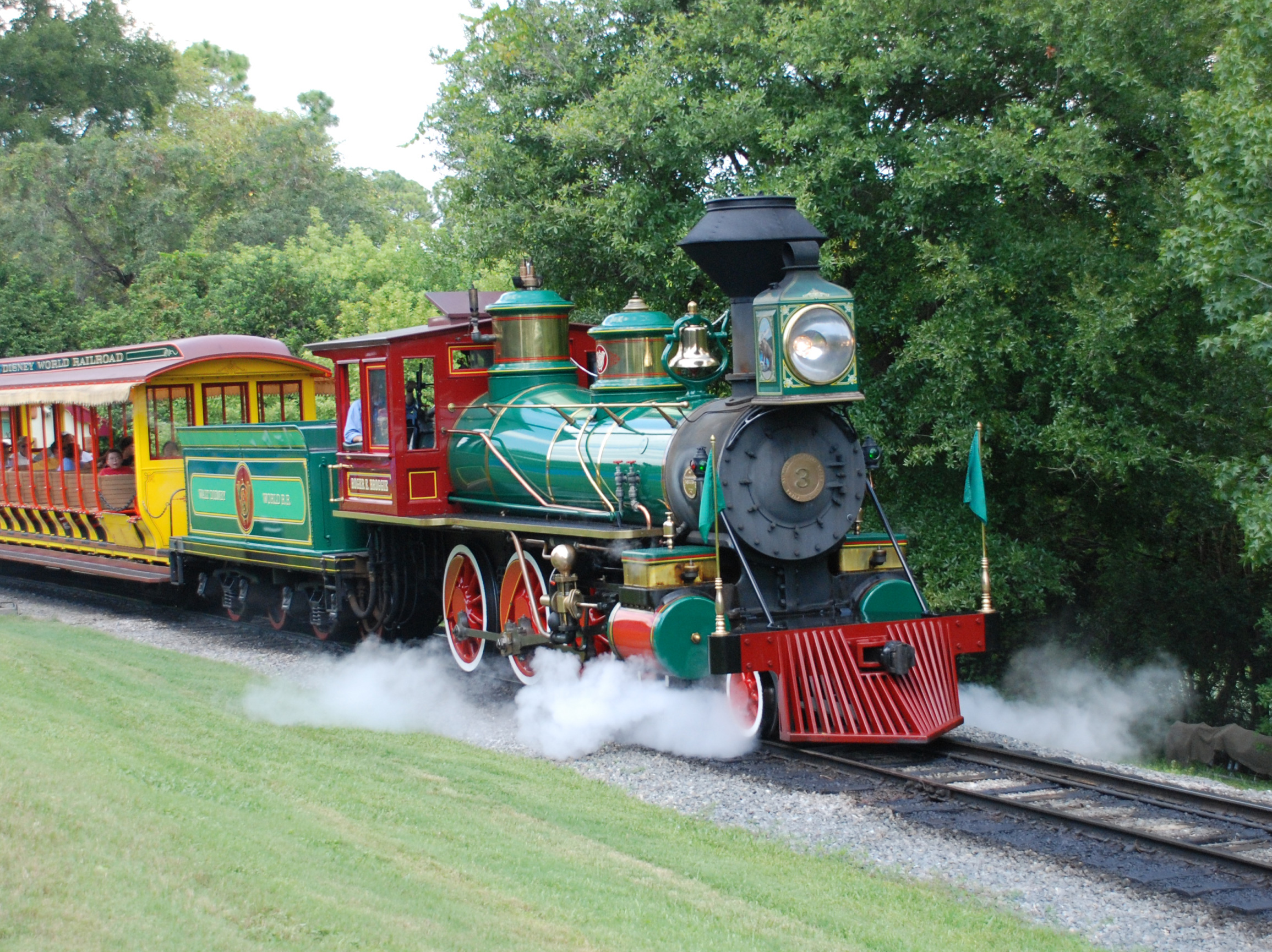
The Roger E. Broggie locomotive pulling its open-air sightseeing coaches on the Walt Disney World Railroad.

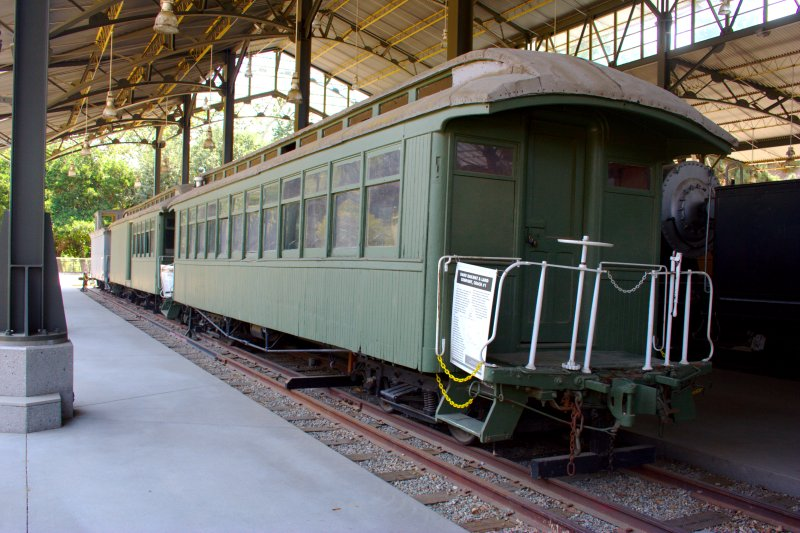
Preserved train cars of the defunct Oahu Railway and Land Company (note the dual gauge track underneath them).

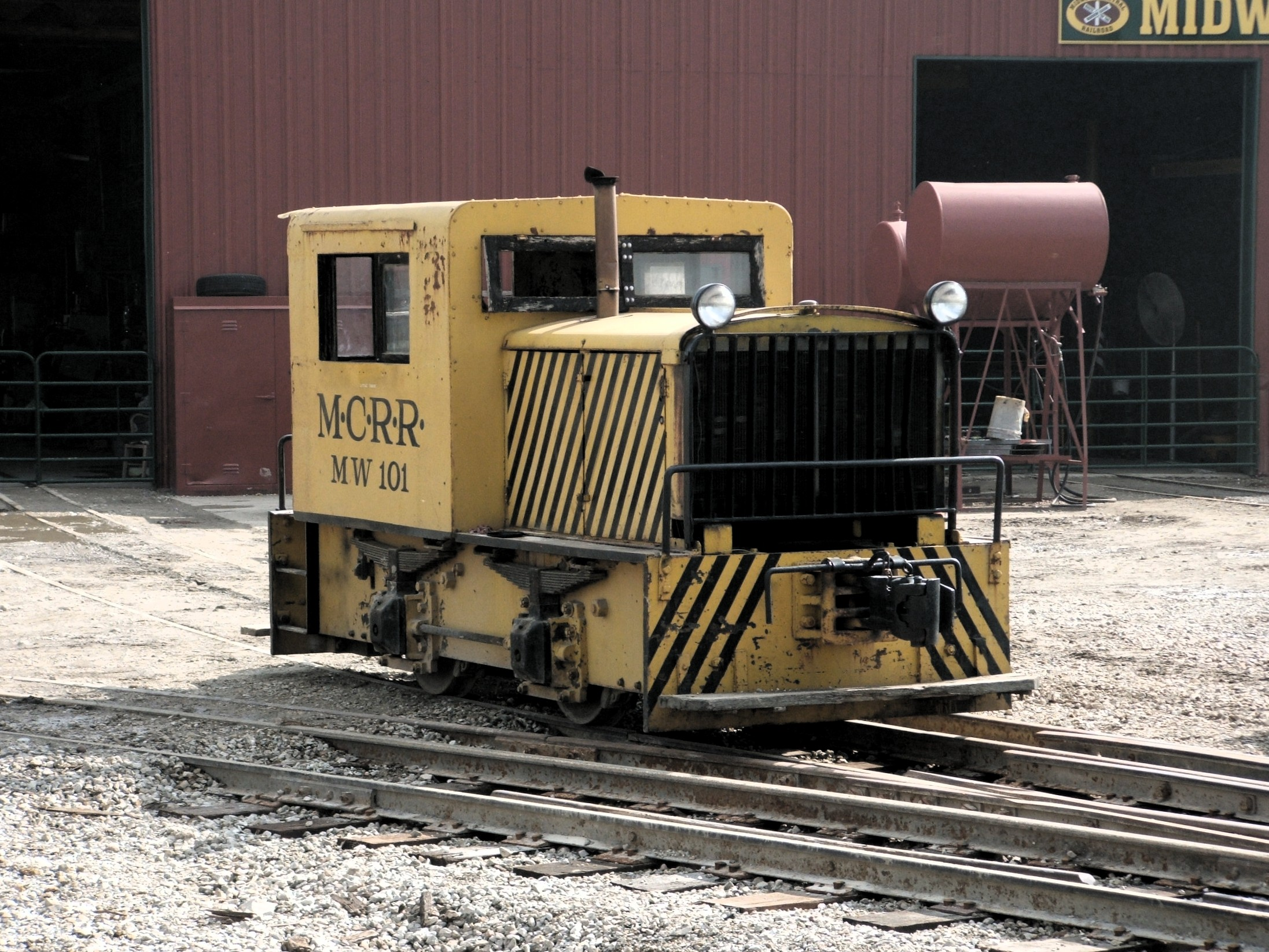
A Midwest Central Railroad gas-powered switcher locomotive in Iowa.

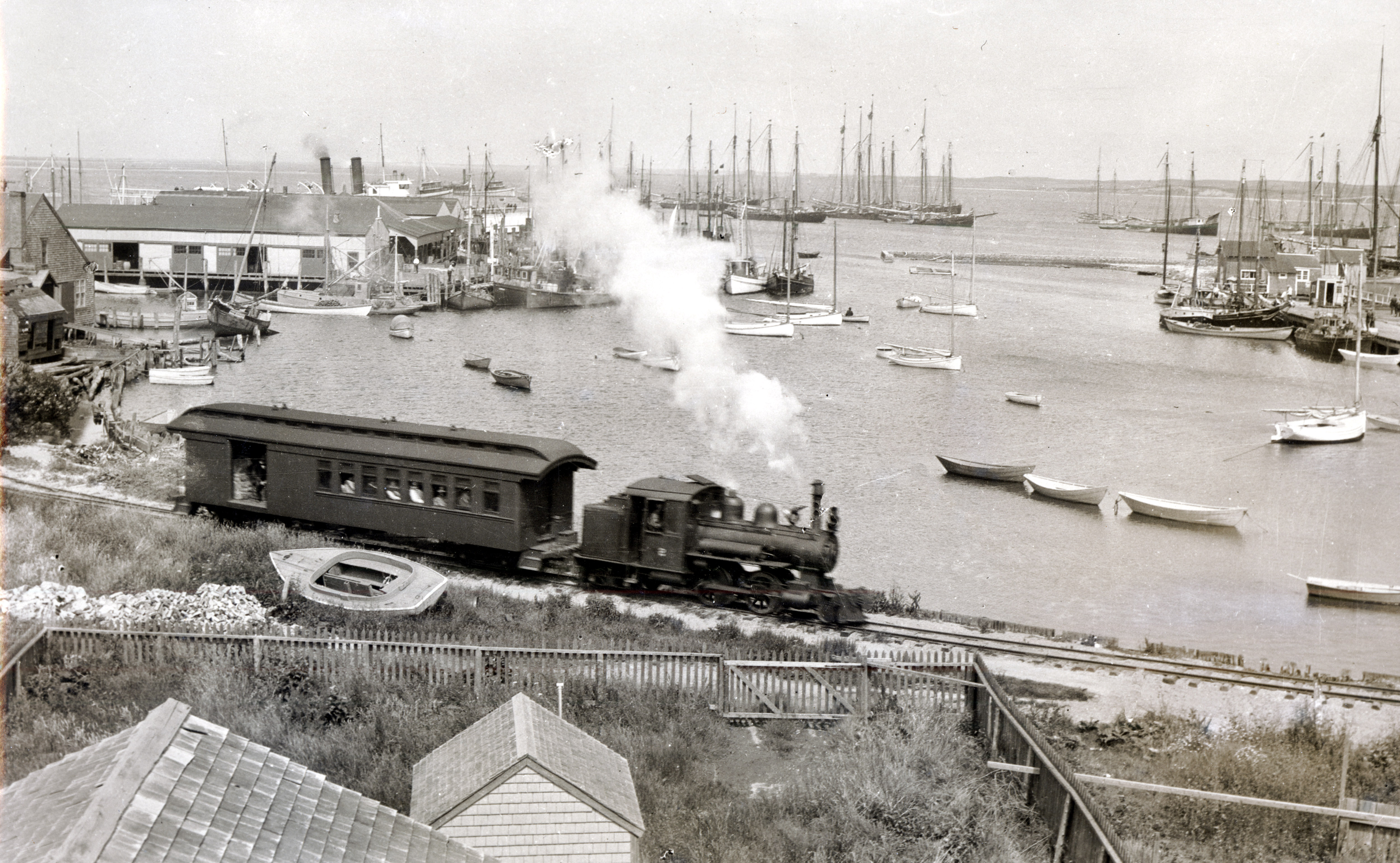
A line of the defunct Nantucket Central Railroad Company sometime between 1910 and 1917.

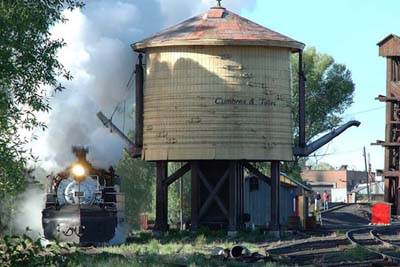
A Cumbres & Toltec Scenic Railroad water tower in its yard in New Mexico.

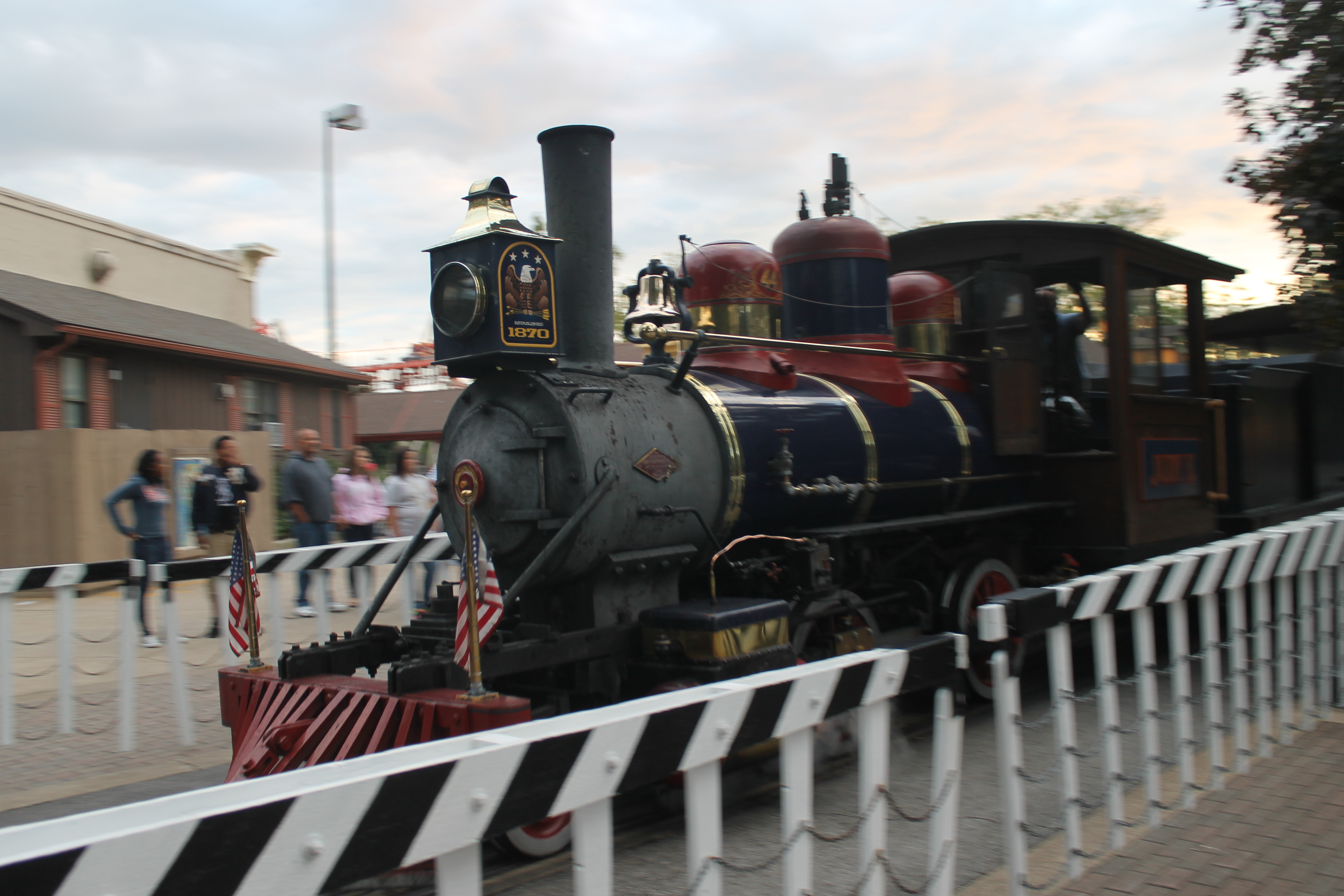
The Cedar Point & Lake Erie Railroad opened in 1963 at the start of Cedar Point's 94th season.

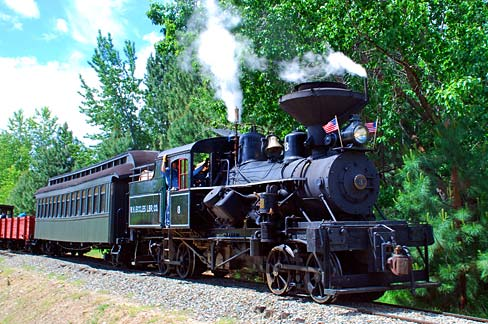
A geared steam locomotive pulling an excursion train on the Sumpter Valley Railway in Oregon.

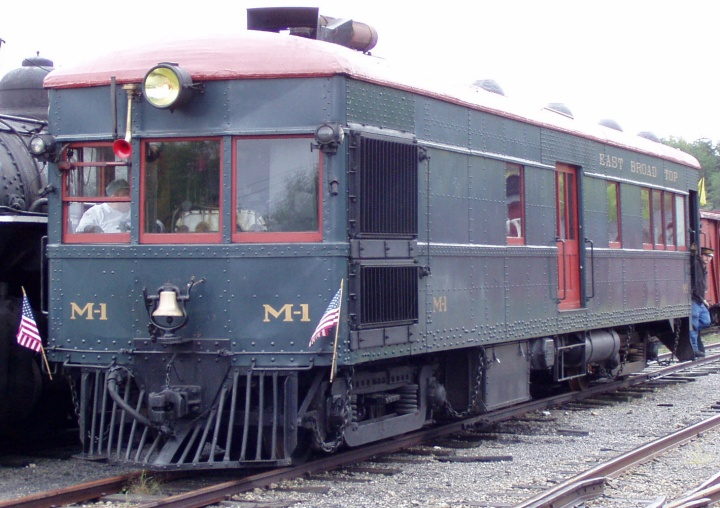
A gas-electric doodlebug constructed by the East Broad Top Railroad and Coal Company of Pennsylvania.

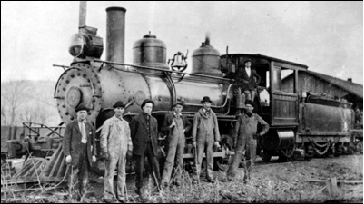
Crewmen in front of a locomotive on the defunct East Tennessee & Western North Carolina Railroad c. 1914.

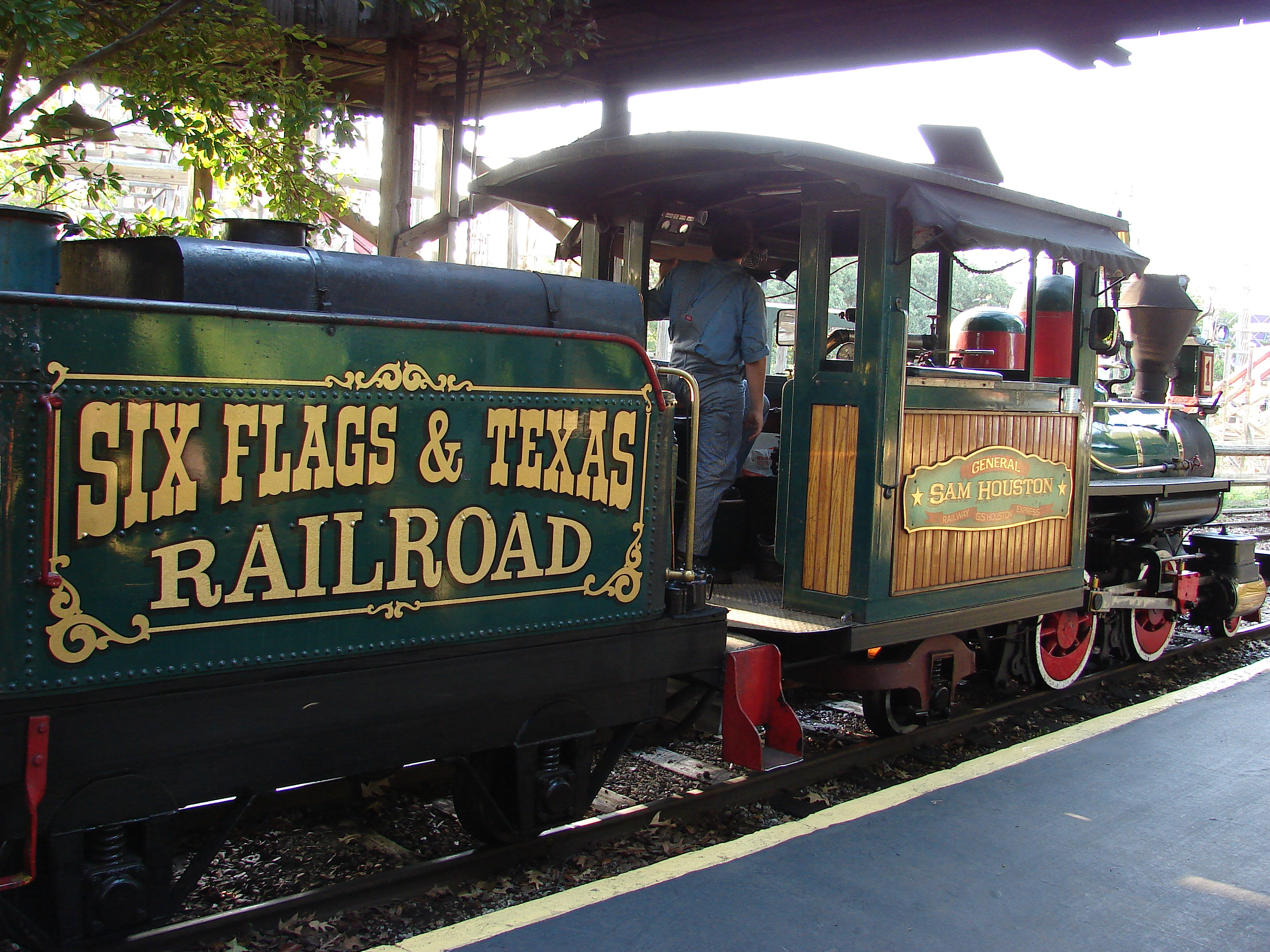
The Six Flags & Texas Railroad, located in Six Flags Over Texas, is the only remaining attraction from the park's inaugural season in 1961.

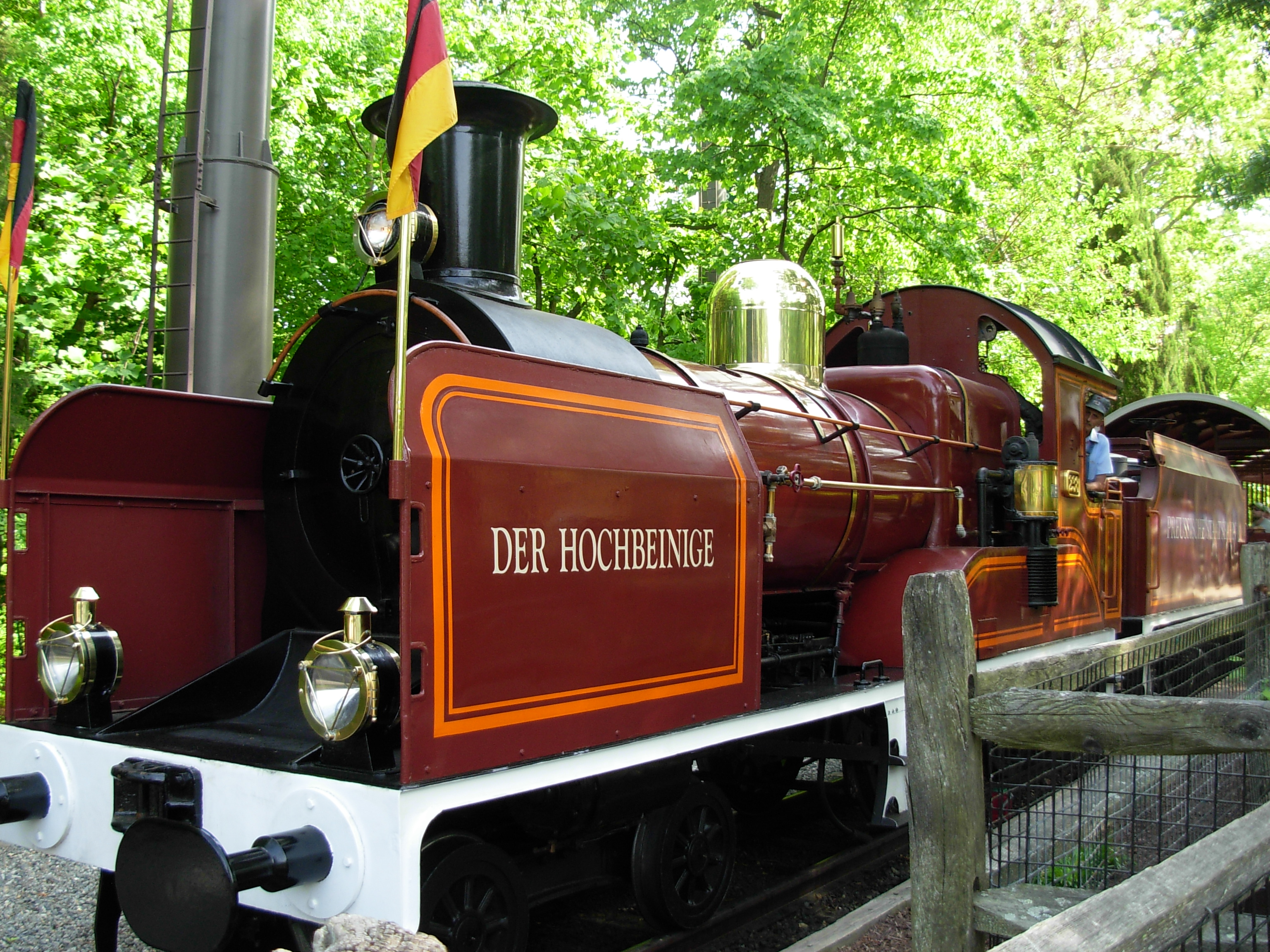
A European-themed locomotive built by Crown Metal Products for the Busch Gardens Railway in Busch Gardens Williamsburg.

This is a list of 3 ft (914 mm) narrow-gauge railways in the United States.

Narrow-gauge railroads of various sizes existed across the US, especially during the late 1800s, with the most popular gauge being 3 ft gauge. Some of the more famous 3 ft gauge railroad networks in the US were based in California, Colorado, and Hawaii. These narrow-gauge lines were easier to build than standard gauge and cost significantly less to construct. Some of the lines of these former networks still exist in the present day and continue to use 3 ft gauge track, while the rest were either widened to standard gauge or abandoned (see table below).

== Railroads ==
State/territory	Railway
Alabama	Anniston and Atlantic Railroad (defunct); East and West Railroad of Alabama (crossed into Georgia) (converted to standard gauge) (defunct)
Alaska	Alaska Railroad (standard gauge lines also present) (dual gauge lines with standard gauge track previously present) (defunct - standard gauge lines still operating); Crooked Creek & Whiskey Island Railroad (located in Pioneer Park) (operating); Tanana Valley Railroad (defunct); White Pass & Yukon Route (crosses into British Columbia, Canada and Yukon, Canada) (Historic Civil Engineering Landmark status) (operating)
Arizona	Legend City Railroad (located in Legend City) (defunct); Magma Arizona Railroad (converted to standard gauge) (defunct); Mohave and Milltown Railway (defunct); Superstition Narrow Gauge Railroad (located in Goldfield Ghost Town) (operating); United Verde & Pacific Railway (defunct)
Arkansas	Arkansas Midland Railroad (1883-1887, then converted to standard gauge) (defunct); Batesville and Brinkley Railroad (1881-1888, then converted to standard gauge) (defunct); Hot Springs Railroad (1876-1889, then converted to standard gauge) (defunct); Southwestern Arkansas and Indian Territory Railroad (1885-1891, then converted to standard gauge) (defunct)
California	Ardenwood Historic Farm (U.S. National Register of Historic Places status) (operating); Bodie and Benton Railway and Commercial Company (defunct); Borate and Daggett Railroad (dual gauge lines with standard gauge track also present) (defunct); California & Mt. Diablo Railroad (defunct); California and Nevada Railroad (defunct); California State Railroad Museum (standard gauge lines and dual gauge lines with standard gauge track also present) (all 3 ft gauge trackage is dual-gauged with standard gauge trackage) (operating); Crystal Springs & Southwestern Railroad (located at the Travel Town Museum) (defunct - museum still operating); Death Valley Railroad (defunct); Deer Lake Park & Julian Railroad (located at the vacation home of Disney animator Ollie Johnston) (defunct); Delta Consolidated Mining Company (defunct); Diamond and Caldor Railway (defunct); Disneyland Railroad (located in Disneyland) (separate 2 ft (610 mm) gauge railway named Casey Jr. Circus Train also present; and separate 2 ft 6 in (762 mm) gauge railway named Mine Train Through Nature's Wonderland and separate 2 ft 6 in (762 mm) gauge railway named Viewliner Train of Tomorrow previously present) (operating); Ghost Town & Calico Railroad (located in Knott's Berry Farm) (separate 2 ft (610 mm) gauge railway named Calico Mine Ride and separate 2 ft (610 mm) gauge railway named Grand Sierra Scenic Railroad also present) (operating); Grand Centennial Excursion Railroad (located in Six Flags Magic Mountain) (separate 1,000 mm (3 ft 3 3/8 in) gauge railway named Orient Express also present and separate 2 ft (610 mm) gauge railway named 99 Steam Train previously present) (defunct - park and first separate railway still operating); Great America Scenic Railway (located in California's Great America) (defunct - park still operating); Grizzly Flats Railroad (located at the home of Disney animator Ward Kimball) (influenced the design of the Disneyland Railroad) (defunct); Imperial Gypsum Company Railroad (defunct); Jolly Trolley (located in Disneyland) (separate 2 ft (610 mm) gauge railway named Casey Jr. Circus Train also present; and separate 2 ft 6 in (762 mm) gauge railway named Mine Train Through Nature's Wonderland and separate 2 ft 6 in (762 mm) gauge railway named Viewliner Train of Tomorrow previously present) (defunct - park still operating); Justi Creek Railway (private) (adjacent to the home of and owned by Pixar and Walt Disney Animation Studios CCO John Lasseter) (the train from the Deer Lake Park & Julian Railroad and the depot building from the Grizzly Flats Railroad are incorporated) (operating); Laws Railroad Museum and Historic Site (operating); Main Street Vehicles (located in Disneyland) (separate 2 ft (610 mm) gauge railway named Casey Jr. Circus Train also present; and separate 2 ft 6 in (762 mm) gauge railway named Mine Train Through Nature's Wonderland and separate 2 ft 6 in (762 mm) gauge railway named Viewliner Train of Tomorrow previously present) (operating); Monterey and Salinas Valley Railroad (converted to standard gauge Monterey Branch Line); Nevada County Narrow Gauge Railroad (defunct); Nevada County Narrow Gauge Railroad & Transportation Museum (operating); Neverland Valley Railroad (located in Neverland Ranch, Michael Jackson's home and amusement park) (separate 2 ft (610 mm) gauge railway also present) (defunct); North Pacific Coast Railroad (defunct); Northwestern Pacific Railroad (standard gauge lines also present) (dual gauge lines with standard gauge track previously present) (defunct - standard gauge lines still operating); Pacific Coast Railroad (private) (operating); Pacific Coast Railway (defunct); Pacific Portland Cement Company (defunct); Roaring Camp & Big Trees Narrow Gauge Railroad (Historic Mechanical Engineering Landmark status shared between three locomotives) (operating); San Joaquin and Sierra Nevada Railroad (defunct); San Luis Obispo & Santa Maria Valley Railroad (defunct); Sandstone Crag Loop Line (private) (operating); Santa Cruz and Felton Railroad (defunct); Sonoma Valley Railroad (defunct); South Pacific Coast Railroad (defunct); Southern California Railway Museum (standard gauge lines, 3 ft 6 in (1,067 mm) gauge lines, and dual gauge lines with standard gauge track and 3 ft 6 in gauge track also present) (operating); Southern Pacific: narrow gauge system(defunct); USG Corporation (Midland facility) (defunct); USG Corporation (Plaster City facility) (private) (operating); Waterloo Mining Railroad (defunct); Watsonville Traction Company (defunct); West Side Lumber Company Railway (defunct); Yosemite Mountain Sugar Pine Railroad (operating)
Colorado	Argentine Central Railway (defunct); Book Cliff Railroad (defunct); Colorado and Southern Railway (U.S. Class I railroad) (standard gauge lines also present) (dual gauge lines with standard gauge track previously present) (converted to standard gauge) (defunct); Colorado Central Railroad (crossed into Wyoming) (standard gauge lines also present) (defunct); Colorado Railroad Museum (dual gauge lines with standard gauge track also present) (operating); Como Roundhouse, Railroad Depot and Hotel Complex (operating); Cumbres & Toltec Scenic Railroad (former D&RGW line); Denver & Rio Grande Railroad (crossed into New Mexico) (standard gauge lines and dual gauge lines with standard gauge track also present) (partially converted to standard gauge) (defunct); Denver & Rio Grande Railway (crossed into New Mexico) (defunct); Denver & Rio Grande Western Railroad (U.S. Class I railroad) (standard gauge lines also present) (dual gauge lines with standard gauge track previously present) (converted to standard gauge) (defunct); Denver, Leadville and Gunnison Railway (defunct); Denver, South Park and Pacific Railroad (defunct); Durango & Silverton Narrow Gauge Railroad (former D&RGW branch line) (Historic Civil Engineering Landmark status) (U.S. National Historic Landmark status) (operating); Florence and Cripple Creek Railroad (defunct); Georgetown Loop Railroad (reconstructed C&S line) (U.S. National Historic Landmark status shared with nearby towns of Georgetown and Silver Plume) (operating); Gilpin Railroad (2 ft (610 mm) gauge lines and dual gauge lines with 2 ft gauge track also present) (all 3 ft (914 mm) gauge trackage was dual-gauged with 2 ft gauge trackage) (defunct); Greeley, Salt Lake and Pacific Railway (standard gauge lines also present) (defunct); Incline Railway (located in Royal Gorge Bridge & Park) (separate 2 ft gauge railway named Silver Rock Railway also present) (closed); Little Book Cliff Railway (defunct); Manitou Incline (defunct); Midland Terminal Railway (converted to standard gauge) (defunct); Rio Grande Southern Railroad (defunct); Silverton, Gladstone and Northerly Railroad (defunct); Silverton Northern Railroad (defunct); Silverton Railroad (defunct); Uintah Railway (crossed into Utah) (defunct)
Connecticut	Connecticut Antique Machinery Association (operating)
Florida	Florida Midland Railway (converted from standard gauge) (defunct); Florida Southern Railroad (standard gauge lines also present) (converted to standard gauge) (defunct); Florida Southern Railway (partially converted to standard gauge) (defunct); Fort Meade Street Railway (defunct); Great America Railway (located in Kirby Family Farm) (operating); Green Cove Springs and Melrose Railroad (defunct); Jacksonville and Atlantic Railroad (defunct); Jacksonville, St. Augustine and Halifax River Railway (converted to standard gauge) (defunct); Jupiter and Lake Worth Railway (defunct); Leesburg Transfer Company (defunct); Main Street Vehicles (located in Magic Kingdom) (operating); Orange Belt Railway (defunct); Palatka and Heights Street Railway (defunct); Petticoat Junction Railroad (located in Petticoat Junction Amusement Park) (defunct); Pioneer & Western Railroad (located in Pioneer City) (defunct); Sanford and St. Petersburg Railroad (partially converted to standard gauge) (defunct); Serengeti Express (located in Busch Gardens Tampa) (operating); South Florida Railroad (converted to standard gauge) (defunct); Southern Railway & Six Gun (located in Six Gun Territory) (defunct); St. Johns & Halifax Railway (defunct); St. Johns & Halifax River Railway (converted to standard gauge) (defunct); St. Johns & Lake Eustis Railway Company (defunct); Walt Disney World Railroad (located in Magic Kingdom) (operating); Wildlife Express Train (located in Disney's Animal Kingdom) (operating)
Georgia	Americus, Preston and Lumpkin Railroad (defunct); Augusta, Gibson and Sandersville Railroad (defunct); Bowden Lithia Springs Short Line Railroad (defunct); Chattanooga, Rome and Columbus Railroad (converted to standard gauge) (defunct); Cherokee Railroad (converted from 5 ft (1,524 mm) gauge) (defunct); Columbus and Rome Railway (defunct); Gainesville, Jefferson and Southern Railroad (defunct); Hartwell Railway (defunct); North and South Railroad of Georgia (defunct); Roswell Railroad (defunct); Savannah, Americus and Montgomery Railway (crossed into Alabama) (converted to standard gauge) (defunct); Six Flags Railroad (located in Six Flags Over Georgia) (operating); Vulcan Steam Train (located at the Georgia Museum of Agriculture & Historic Village) (operating)
Hawaii	Hawaiian Railway Society (remnant of a former OR&L main line) (operating); Kahului Railroad (defunct); Kauai Plantation Railway (operating); Lahaina, Kaanapali & Pacific Railroad (defunct); Oahu Railway and Land Company (U.S. National Register of Historic Places status) (defunct); Waimanalo Sugar Company (defunct)
Idaho	Silverwood Central Railway (located in Silverwood Theme Park & Boulder Beach Water Park) (operating); Coeur d'Alene Railway and Navigation Company (defunct); Kalispell Creek Railroad (defunct)
Illinois	Danville, Olney and Ohio River Railroad (defunct); Galena and Southern Wisconsin Railroad (crossed into Wisconsin) (defunct); Great America Scenic Railway (located in Six Flags Great America) (operating)
Indiana	Frankfort and Kokomo Railroad (converted from standard gauge) (defunct); Hesston Steam Museum (2 ft (610 mm) gauge lines and dual gauge lines with 2 ft gauge track also present) (all 3 ft (914 mm) gauge trackage is dual-gauged with 2 ft gauge trackage) (separate 14 in (356 mm) gauge railway and separate 7 1/2 in (190.5 mm) gauge railway also present) (operating)
Iowa	Burlington and Northwestern Railway (defunct); Fenelon Place Elevator (U.S. National Register of Historic Places status) (operating); Midwest Central Railroad (located at the Old Thresher's Reunion) (dual gauge lines with standard gauge track also present) (separate standard gauge railway named Midwest Electric Railway also present) (operating)
Kentucky	Louisville, Harrods Creek and Westport Railroad (converted to standard gauge) (defunct); Louisville, Harrods Creek and Westport Railway (defunct)
Louisiana	Old Hickory Railroad (located at the Republic of West Florida Historical Museum) (closed)
Maine	Eastern Maine Railway (formerly the Bucksport & Bangor, converted from 5'6" gauge in 1878, converted to standard in 1883 when taken over by the Maine Central)
Maryland	Baltimore and Delta Railway (defunct); Baltimore and Lehigh Railroad (crossed into Pennsylvania) (derfunct); Baltimore and Lehigh Railway (converted to standard gauge) (defunct); Capital Railways (located in Six Flags America) (operating); Green Ridge Railroad (defunct); Maryland Central Railroad (defunct)
Massachusetts	Boston, Revere Beach and Lynn Railroad (defunct); Boston, Winthrop and Point Shirley Railroad (defunct); Boston, Winthrop and Shore Railroad (defunct); Eastern Junction, Broad Sound Pier and Point Shirley Railroad (defunct); Grafton and Upton Railroad (converted to standard gauge) (operating); Hoosac Tunnel and Wilmington Railroad (crossed into Vermont) (converted to standard gauge) (defunct); Martha's Vineyard Railroad (defunct); Nantucket Central Railroad Company (defunct)
Michigan	Allegan and Lake Shore Railroad (defunct); Au Sable and North Western Railway (defunct); Huckleberry Railroad (located in Crossroads Village) (operating); Lac La Belle and Calumet Railroad (defunct); Lake Linden & Torch Lake Railroad (located at the Houghton County Historical Museum) (operating); Mason and Oceana Railroad (defunct); Paw Paw Railroad (converted from standard gauge) (defunct); Port Huron and Northwestern Railway (defunct); Quincy & Torch Lake Railroad (defunct); Saginaw and Mount Pleasant Railroad (converted to standard gauge) (defunct); St. Joseph Valley Railroad (1880-1889) (defunct); Toledo and South Haven Railroad (defunct)
Mississippi	J.J. White Lumber Company (defunct); Liberty–White Railroad (converted to standard gauge) (defunct)
Missouri	Six Flags Railroad (located in Six Flags St. Louis) (operating); Worlds of Fun Railroad (located in Worlds of Fun & Oceans of Fun) (operating)
Montana	Montana Southern Railway (defunct)
Nebraska	Nebraska Midland Railroad (located at the Stuhr Museum of the Prairie Pioneer) (defunct - museum still operating)
Nevada	Carson & Colorado Railway (crossed into California: part of the Southern Pacific narrow gauge system) (defunct); Carson & Tahoe Lumber & Fluming Company (crossed into California) (defunct); Eureka & Palisade Railroad (defunct); Fort Lucinda Express (located in Fort Lucinda) (defunct); Lake Tahoe Railway and Transportation Company (converted to standard gauge) (defunct); Nevada and Oregon Railroad (crossed into California) (defunct); Nevada–California–Oregon Railway (crossed into California and Oregon: part of the Southern Pacific narrow gauge system) (defunct); Nevada Central Railroad (defunct); Nevada State Railroad Museum (standard gauge lines and dual gauge lines with standard gauge track also present) (operating); Nevada Short Line Railway (defunct); Sierra Nevada Wood and Lumber Company (standard gauge lines also present) (defunct); Tropicana Express Railroad (located at the Tropicana Express Hotel and Casino) (defunct - resort still operating)
New Jersey	Camden, Gloucester & Mt. Ephraim Railway (converted to standard gauge) (defunct); Pine Creek Railroad (located at the New Jersey Museum of Transportation) (operating)
New Mexico	Cumbres & Toltec Scenic Railroad (crosses into Colorado) (remnant of a former D&RGW main line) (Historic Civil Engineering Landmark status) (U.S. National Historic Landmark status) (operating); United States Potash Railroad (defunct)
New York	B&H Rail Corporation (converted to standard gauge) (operating); Buffalo, Pittsburgh and Western Railroad (defunct); Catskill and Tannersville Railway (defunct); Catskill Mountain Railway (defunct); Eastern Railroad of Long Island (converted to standard gauge) (defunct); Fulton Chain Railroad (Peg Leg) (defunct); Gimbels Flyer (located at the 1939 New York World's Fair) (defunct); Glendale and East River Railroad (converted to standard gauge) (defunct); Herkimer, Newport and Poland Railway (defunct); Horse Trolley (located in Freedomland U.S.A.) (separate 2 ft (610 mm) gauge railway named Santa Fe Railroad also present) (defunct); Kaaterskill Railroad (converted to standard gauge) (defunct); Kings County Central Railroad (defunct); Mohawk and Malone Railway (converted to standard gauge) (defunct); Mount Beacon Incline Railway (U.S. National Register of Historic Places status) (closed); New York and Manhattan Beach Railway (dual gauge lines with standard gauge track previously present) (converted to standard gauge) (defunct); New York, Bay Ridge and Jamaica Railroad (converted to standard gauge) (defunct); Otis Elevating Railway (defunct); Point O' Woods Railroad (private) (operating); Saratoga, Mount McGregor and Lake George Railroad (converted to standard gauge) (defunct); Springville and Sardinia Railroad (defunct); Stony Clove & Catskill Mountain Railroad (converted to standard gauge) (defunct)
North Carolina	Carowinds and Carolina Railroad (crossed into South Carolina) (located in Carowinds) (defunct - park still operating); Cherokee Wonderland Railroad (located in Cherokee Wonderland) (defunct); Frontier Land Railroad (located in Frontier Land) (defunct); Lawndale Railway and Industrial Company (defunct); Mouse Mine Train (located in Tweetsie Railroad) (operating); Tweetsie Railroad (operating); Washington and Plymouth Railroad (defunct)
Ohio	Bellaire and St. Clairsville Narrow Gauge Railway (defunct); Carillon Park Railroad (located in Carillon Historical Park) (separate 7 1/2 in (190.5 mm) gauge railway also present) (operating); Cedar Point & Lake Erie Railroad (located in Cedar Point) (operating); Celina, Van Wert and State Line Extension of the Columbus and North–Western Railway (defunct); Cincinnati and Eastern Railway (defunct); Cincinnati, Lebanon and Northern Railway (dual gauge lines with standard gauge track previously present) (converted to standard gauge) (defunct); Cincinnati Northern Railway (1880–1883) (defunct); Cincinnati, Van Wert and Michigan Railroad (converted to standard gauge) (defunct); Dayton and Ironton Railroad (converted to standard gauge) (defunct); Dayton and South Eastern Railroad (defunct); Dayton and Toledo Railroad (defunct); Dayton, Lebanon and Cincinnati Railroad (converted to standard gauge) (defunct); Iron Railroad (4 ft 10 in (1,473 mm) Ohio gauge lines and dual gauge lines with 4 ft 10 in track also present) (all 3 ft (914 mm) gauge trackage was dual-gauged with 4 ft 10 in trackage) (defunct); Kings Island & Miami Valley Railroad (located in Kings Island) (operating); Miami Valley Railway (defunct); Ohio and North Western Railroad (converted to standard gauge) (defunct); Spring Grove, Avondale and Cincinnati Railway (defunct); St. Clairsville Railway (defunct); Toledo, Cincinnati and St. Louis Railroad (crossed into Indiana and Illinois) (4 ft 10 in (1,473 mm) Ohio gauge lines and dual gauge lines with 4 ft 10 in track also present) (defunct); Toledo, Delphos and Burlington Railroad (4 ft 10 in lines and dual gauge lines with 4 ft 10 in track also present) (defunct); Toledo, St. Louis and Kansas City Railroad (crossed into Indiana and Illinois) (converted to standard gauge) (defunct)
Oklahoma	The Christmas Train (located in Dry Gulch, U.S.A.) (defunct - camp still operating)
Oregon	Dayton, Sheridan and Grande Ronde Railroad (derfunct); Oregon Portage Railroad (converted from 5 ft (1,524 mm) gauge) (defunct); Oregonian Railway (defunct); Portland and Willamette Valley Railway (defunct); Portland and Yamhill Railroad (defunct); Sumpter Valley Railway (operating)
Pennsylvania	Altoona and Beech Creek Railroad (defunct); Altoona Northern Railroad (converted to standard gauge) (defunct); Baltimore and Ohio Short Line Railroad (converted to standard gauge) (defunct); Bausman Mine (defunct); Coudersport and Port Allegany Railroad (converted to standard gauge) (defunct); Daniel Tiger's Neighborhood Trolley Ride (located in Idlewild and Soak Zone) (separate 2 ft (610 mm) gauge railway named Loyalhanna Limited Railroad also present) (operating); Eagles Mere Railroad (defunct); East Broad Top Railroad and Coal Company (U.S. National Historic Landmark status) (operating); East Waterford Lumber Company (defunct); Lancaster, Oxford and Southern Railroad (defunct); Lancaster, Oxford and Southern Railway (defunct); Ligonier Valley Railroad (converted to standard gauge) (defunct); Little Saw Mill Run Railroad (dual gauge lines with standard gauge track previously present) (all 3 ft (914 mm) gauge trackage was dual-gauged with standard gauge trackage) (defunct); Newport and Shermans Valley Railroad (defunct); Olde Kennywood Railroad (located in Kennywood) (U.S. National Historic Landmark status shared with entire park) (operating); Peach Bottom Railroad (defunct); Peach Bottom Railway (defunct); Perry Lumber Railroad (defunct); Pittsburgh and Western Railroad (defunct); Pittsburgh Southern Railroad (dual gauge lines with standard gauge track also present) (defunct); Pittsburgh Southern Railway (dual gauge lines with standard gauge track previously present) (converted to standard gauge) (defunct); Slate Ridge and Delta Railway (defunct); Susquehanna and Eagles Mere Railroad (defunct); Tuscarora Valley Railroad (defunct); Waynesburg and Washington Railroad (converted to standard gauge) (defunct); York and Peach Bottom Railway (defunct)
South Carolina	Argent Lumber Company (defunct); Cheraw and Chester Railroad Company (defunct); Chester and Lenoir Narrow Gauge Railroad (crossed into North Carolina) (defunct); Lancaster and Chester Railroad (converted to standard gauge) (operating)
South Dakota	Black Hills and Fort Pierre Railroad (dual gauge lines with standard gauge track also present) (defunct); Deadwood Central Railroad (dual gauge lines with standard gauge track previously present) (defunct)
Tennessee	Duck River Valley Narrow Gauge Railway (opened 1877, converted to standard gauge 1888, closed 1961); Doe River Gorge (operating); Dollywood Express (located in Dollywood) (operating); East Tennessee & Western North Carolina Railroad (crossed into North Carolina) (standard gauge lines and dual gauge lines with standard gauge track also present) (defunct); Huff 'n' Puff Railroad (located in Lakeland Amusement Park) (separate 16 in (406 mm) gauge railway also present) (defunct); Opryland Railroad (located in Opryland USA) (defunct)
Texas	610 Limited (located in Six Flags AstroWorld) (defunct); Austin and Northwestern Railroad (converted to standard gauge) (defunct); Corpus Christi, San Diego and Rio Grande Narrow Gauge Railroad (defunct); Fiesta Texas Railroad (located in Six Flags Fiesta Texas) (operating); Historic Jefferson Railway (operating); Old Galveston Railway (located in Magic Landing) (defunct); Six Flags & Texas Railroad (located in Six Flags Over Texas) (operating); Texas and St. Louis Railway (crosses into Arkansas and Missouri) (1875-1886, then converted to standard gauge)(defunct); Texas Mexican Railway (converted to standard gauge) (operating)
Utah	American Fork Railroad (defunct); Bingham Canyon & Camp Floyd Railroad (defunct); Crescent Mining Company Tramway (defunct); Salt Lake & Eastern Railway (defunct); Salt Lake & Fort Douglas Railway (defunct); San Pete Valley Railroad (defunct); Rio Grande Western Railway (crossed into Colorado) (converted to standard gauge) (defunct); Utah and Nevada Railway (defunct); Utah & Northern Railway (crossed into Idaho and Montana) (dual gauge lines with standard gauge track previously present) (partially converted to standard gauge) (defunct); Wasatch & Jordan Valley Railway (defunct)
Vermont	Brattleboro and Whitehall Railroad (defunct); Deerfield River Railroad (crossed into Massachusetts) (defunct)
Virginia	Atlantic and Danville Railway (defunct); Busch Gardens Railway (located in Busch Gardens Williamsburg) (operating); Old Dominion Line (located in Kings Dominion) (defunct - park still operating); Potomac, Fredericksburg and Piedmont Railroad (converted from standard gauge) (defunct); Shenandoah Central Railroad (defunct); Western Railroad (located in Lakeside Amusement Park (Salem, Virginia)) (defunct)
Washington	Cascades Railroad (converted from 5 ft (1,524 mm) gauge, then converted from standard gauge) (defunct); Ilwaco Railway and Navigation Company (defunct); Seattle and Walla Walla Railroad (defunct); Spokane Cable Railway (defunct); Tacoma Eastern Railroad (converted to standard gauge) (defunct); Walla Walla and Columbia River Railroad (defunct)
West Virginia	Twin Mountain and Potomac Railroad (defunct)
Wisconsin	Chicago and Tomah Railroad (defunct)
Wyoming	Oregon Short Line Railway (crossed into Idaho and Oregon) (dual gauge lines with standard gauge track previously present) (all 3 ft (914 mm) gauge trackage was dual-gauged with standard gauge trackage) (defunct)

== See also ==
- Narrow-gauge railroads in the United States
- Heritage railway
- 2 ft gauge railroads in the United States
- 2 ft 6 in gauge railroads in the United States
- 3 ft gauge railways in the United Kingdom
- Three foot six inch gauge railways in the United States
- Three foot gauge locomotives on the U.S. National Register of Historic Places
  - Rio Grande 168 (operational)
  - Rio Grande 169 (static display)
  - Rio Grande 223 (stored)
  - Rio Grande 278 (static display)
  - Rio Grande 315 (operational)
  - Rio Grande 463 (operational)
  - ET&WNC No. 12 (operational)
  - Eureka Locomotive (operational)
  - Glenbrook Locomotive (operational)

== Bibliography ==
- Broggie, Michael (2014), Walt Disney's Railroad Story: The Small-Scale Fascination That Led to a Full-Scale Kingdom (4th ed.), The Donning Company Publishers, ISBN 978-1-57864-914-3
