= 2 ft gauge railroads in the United States =

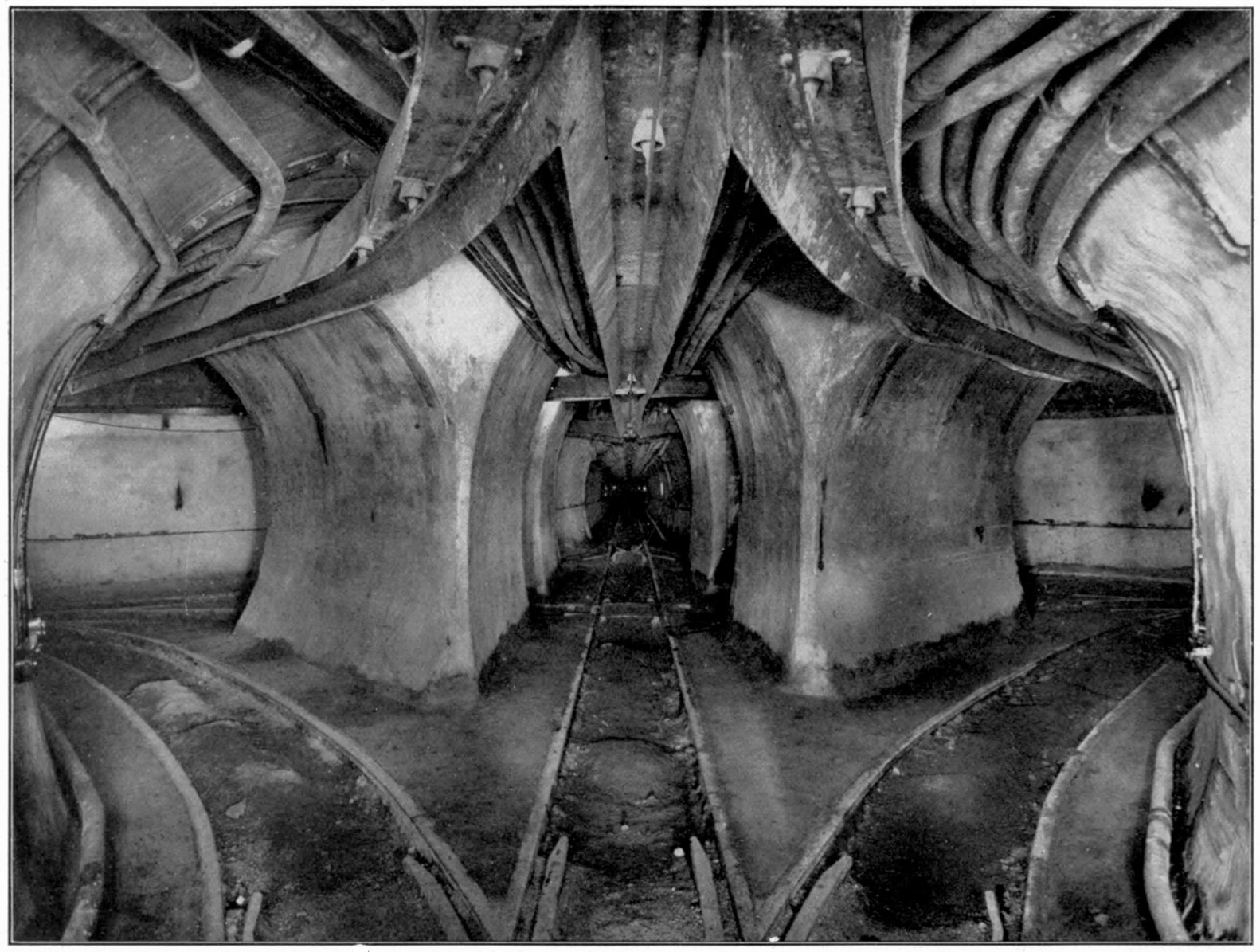
A junction on the underground freight railway network built by the defunct Chicago Tunnel Company.

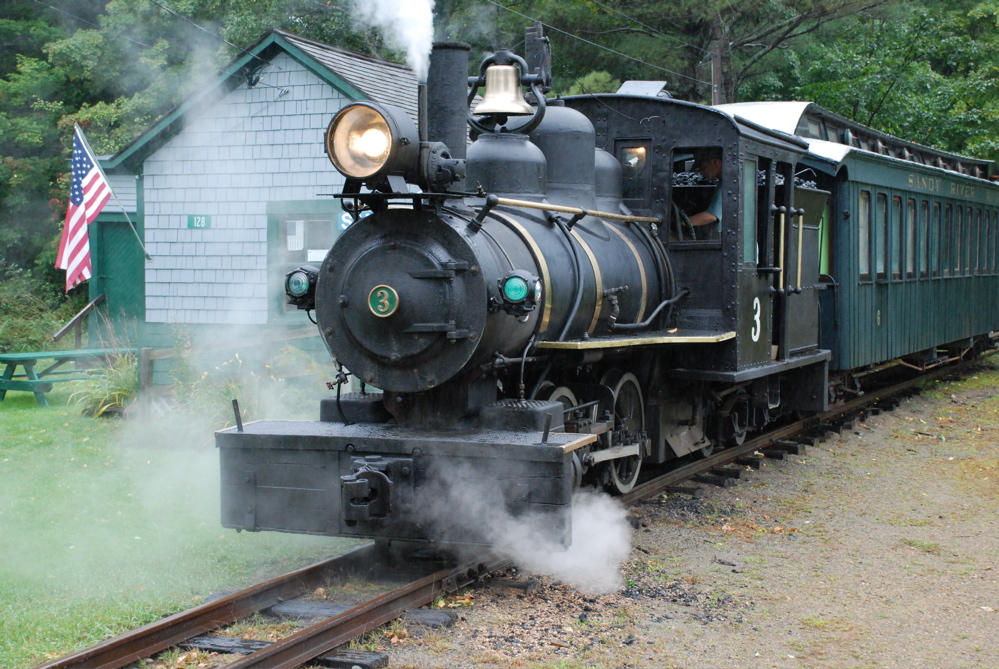
A steam train on a revived segment of the Sandy River and Rangeley Lakes Railroad in Maine.

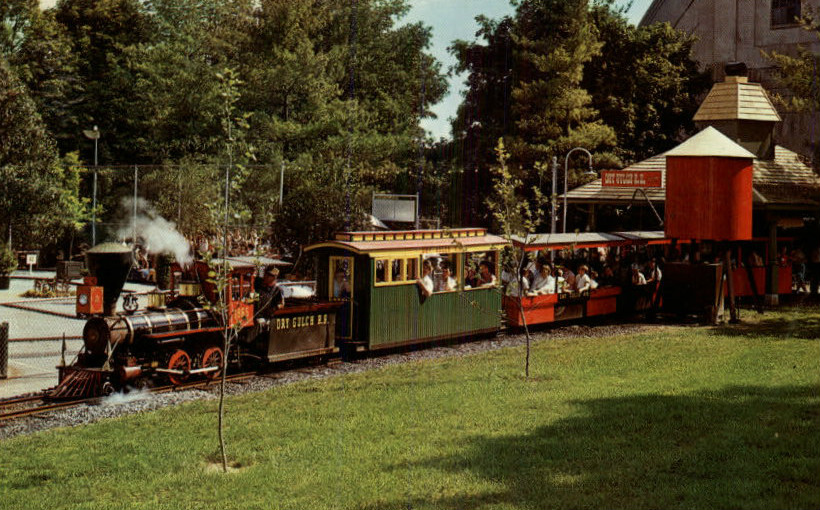
A Crown Metal Products-built train on Hersheypark's Dry Gulch Railroad in Pennsylvania in 1966.

A list of 2 ft (610 mm) narrow-gauge railways in the United States.

== Railroads ==
State/territory	Railway
Alabama	Birmingham Zoo Express/Red Diamond Express (located in Birmingham Zoo) (converted from 16 in / 406 mm gauge) (operating); Noccalula Falls Park Train (Located in Gadsden Alabama, Noccalula Falls Park and Campground); Shelby & Southern Railroad (located at the Heart of Dixie Railroad Museum) (separate 4 ft 8 1/2 in / 1,435 mm railroad named Calera & Shelby Railroad also present) (operating); Wales West Light Railway (located in Wales West RV Resort & Light Railway) (operating)
Arizona	Old Tucson (operating)
Arkansas	Century Flyer (operating)
California	Kelley Park Express (defunct) (located in San Jose's Kelley park) (sections of line buried in Happy Hollow expansion); 99 Steam Train (located in Six Flags Magic Mountain) (separate 1,000 mm (3 ft 3 3/8 in) gauge railway named Orient Express also present and separate 3 ft (914 mm) gauge railway named Grand Centennial Excursion Railroad previously present) (defunct - park and first separate railway still operating); California Living Museum (located in Bakersfield, California) (operating); Bonfante Railroad (located in Gilroy Gardens Family Theme Park) (operating); Grand Sierra Railroad (located in Knott's Berry Farm) (separate 3 ft (914 mm) gauge railway named Ghost Town & Calico Railroad also present) (operating); Casey Jr. Circus Train (located in Disneyland) (separate 3 ft (914 mm) gauge railway named Disneyland Railroad and separate 3 ft (914 mm) gauge railway named Main Street Vehicles also present; and separate 3 ft (914 mm) gauge railway named Jolly Trolley, separate 2 ft 6 in (762 mm) gauge railway named Mine Train Through Nature's Wonderland, and separate 2 ft 6 in (762 mm) gauge railway named Viewliner Train of Tomorrow previously present) (operating); Castle Park Railroad (located in Castle Park) (separate 14 in (356 mm) gauge railway named Riverside Express also present) (operating); Descanso, Alpine and Pacific Railway (operating); Grand Sierra Scenic Railroad (located in Knott's Berry Farm) (separate 3 ft (914 mm) gauge railway named Ghost Town & Calico Railroad also present) (operating); Kennedy Express (located in Kennedy Park (Hayward, California)) (operating); Neverland Express at Neverland Ranch (Michael Jackson's home and amusement park) (separate 3 ft (914 mm) gauge railway named Neverland Valley Railroad also present) (defunct); Sonoma Magnesite Tramway (defunct); Zoo Train (located in Santa Barbara Zoo) (operating)
Colorado	Cripple Creek & Victor Narrow Gauge Railroad (operating); Gilpin Railroad (dual gauge lines with 3 ft (914 mm) gauge track also present) (defunct); Silver Rock Railway (located in Royal Gorge Bridge & Park) (separate 3 ft (914 mm) gauge railway named Incline Railway also present) (closed); The Lakeshore Scenic Route (located in Lakeside Amusement Park) (operating)
Connecticut	C.P. Huntington Train (located in Lake Compounce) (separate standard-gauge railway named The Trolley also present) (operating); Quassy Express Train is a C.P. Huntington Train (located in Quassy Park) 24" narrow-gauge railroad built by Chance Rides.
Florida	East Swamp & Gatorville Railroad (defunct); Edwin Link Children's Railroad (located at the Gold Coast Railroad Museum) (separate standard-gauge railway also present) (operating); Everglade Express (located in Lion Country Safari) (defunct - park still operating); Gatorland Express (located in Gatorland) (operating); Green Meadows Petting Farm (Kissimmee, Florida) (defunct); Veterans Memorial Railroad (located in Veterans Memorial Park) (operating)
Georgia	Safari Train (located at Wild Adventures Theme Park) (operating); Tallulah Falls Railway Museum (seasonal)
Hawaii	Ahukini Terminal and Railway Company 2 ft 6 in (762 mm) (defunct); Hawaiian Railway Society 3 ft (914 mm) (operating); Kahului Railroad 3 ft (914 mm) (defunct); Kauai Railway 2 ft 6 in (762 mm) (defunct); Kauai Plantation Railway (Kahului Railroad Company and Maui Railroad & Steamship Company) 3 ft (914 mm) (operating); Kīlauea Sugar Plantation Railway 2 ft (610 mm) (defunct); Lahaina, Kaanapali and Pacific Railroad 3 ft (914 mm) (defunct); Oahu Railway and Land Company 3 ft (914 mm) (defunct); Waianae Sugar Company 2 ft 6 in (762 mm); See also: Heritage railways in Kauaʻi and List of Hawaii railroads
Illinois	Chicago Tunnel Company (temporary 14 in (356 mm) gauge lines used during construction process) (defunct); George Waters Memorial Railroad (located at the Prairie Land Heritage Museum) (operating)
Indiana	Hesston Steam Museum (dual-gauge lines with 3 ft (914 mm) gauge track also present) (separate 14 in (356 mm) gauge railway and separate 7 1/2 in (190.5 mm) gauge railway also present) (operating)
Kentucky	Richwood Tahoe Railroad (operating)
Louisiana	Bayou Le Zoo Choo Choo (located in Alexandria Zoological Park) (operating)
Maine	Boothbay Railway Village (operating); Bridgton and Saco River Railroad (dual-gauge lines with standard gauge track also present) (defunct); Eustis Railroad (defunct); Franklin and Megantic Railway (defunct); Kennebec Central Railroad (defunct); Kingfield and Dead River Railroad (defunct); Madrid Railroad (defunct); Maine Narrow Gauge Railroad Co. & Museum (operating); Monson Railroad (defunct); Phillips and Rangeley Railroad (defunct); S.D. Warren Paper Mill (standard-gauge lines also present) (defunct); Sandy River & Rangeley Lakes Railroad (operating); Sandy River Railroad (defunct); Wiscasset, Waterville and Farmington Railway (operating)
Massachusetts	Billerica and Bedford Railroad (defunct); Edaville Railroad (operating); Old Smokey Railroad Line (located in Pleasure Island) (defunct)
Michigan	Tauber Family Railroad (located in Detroit Zoo) (operating); Toonerville Trolley in Soo Junction (operating); Liberty Farms & Neo Wilson Railway (currently under construction)
Minnesota	Lake Region Threshers Show Dalton MN (600 mm / 1 ft 11 5/8 in gauge) (operating)
Missouri	Emerson Zooline Railroad (located in Saint Louis Zoo) (operating); Frisco Silver Dollar Line (located in Silver Dollar City) (separate narrow-gauge railway used as a component of the Marvel Cave attraction also present) (operating)
Nebraska	ZO&O Railroad (located in Lincoln Children's Zoo) (operating)
Nevada	Carson & Mills Park Railroad (located in Mills Park) (operating)
New Hampshire	Canobie Express (located in Canobie Lake Park) (operating); Huff Puff and Whistle Railroad (located in Story Land) (operating); J.E. Henry Railway (located in Loon Mountain Resort) (operating)
New Jersey	Turtle Back Junction (located in Turtle Back Zoo) (operating); Van Saun Park Railroad (located in Van Saun County Park) (operating)
New Mexico	Silver City, Pinos Altos and Mogollon Railroad (derfunct)
New York	Erie Canal Village (operating); Santa Fe Railroad (located in Freedomland U.S.A.) (separate 3 ft (914 mm) gauge railway named Horse Trolley also present) (defunct)
North Carolina	Mideast Railroad (located in Ederville) (operating); Museum of Life and Science (operating); Pullen Park (operating)
Ohio	J&L Narrow Gauge Railroad (located in Youngstown Steel Heritage) (operating)
Oregon	Oaks Amusement Park (operating); Little Pixie (located in Pixieland) (defunct)
Pennsylvania	Bucksgahuda and Western Railroad (operating); City Island Railroad (operating); Dry Gulch Railroad (located in Hersheypark) (operating); Foster Brook & State Line Railroad (private) (operating); Loyalhanna Limited Railroad (located in Idlewild and Soak Zone) (separate 3 ft (914 mm) gauge railway named Daniel Tiger's Neighborhood Trolley Ride also present) (operating); Mount Gretna Narrow Gauge Railway (defunct); Tipton Creek Railroad (located in DelGrosso's Amusement Park) (operating); Zephyr Railroad (located in Dorney Park & Wildwater Kingdom) (separate 2 ft 6 in (762 mm) gauge railway named Cedar Creek Cannonball also present) (operating)
Texas	Busch Gardens Houston (defunct); Forest Park Miniature Railroad (located in Forest Park (Fort Worth, Texas)) (operating); Hempstead & Northern Railroad (private) (operating); Hermann Park Railroad (located in Hermann Park) (operating); San Antonio Zoo Eagle (located in Brackenridge Park) (operating); Shark Voyage (located in Downtown Aquarium, Houston) (operating)
Utah	Bingham Central Railway (defunct); S&S Shortline Railroad Park & Museum (separate 7 1/2 in (190.5 mm) gauge railway also present) (operating); Wild Kingdom Train (located in Lagoon) (separate 2 ft (610 mm) gauge railway named Pioneer Village Railroad and two separate 12 in (305 mm) gauge railways, the more recent one being named Lagoon Miniature Railway, previously present) (operating)
Virginia	Portsmouth City Railroad (located in Portsmouth City Park) (operating)
Washington	Bow Hill Railroad (private) (operating); Tolt River Railroad Steam Train Ride (located in Remlinger Farms) (operating)

== See also ==
- Narrow-gauge railroads in the United States
- Heritage railway
- Large amusement railways
- 2 ft and 600 mm gauge railways in the United Kingdom
- 2 ft 6 in gauge railroads in the United States
- 3 ft gauge railroads in the United States
- 3 ft 6 in gauge railways in the United States
