= 2 ft 6 in gauge railroads in the United States =

A list of 2 ft 6 in gauge railways in the United States.

== Railroads ==
State/territory	Railway
California	Angels Flight (U.S. National Register of Historic Places status) (operating); BuJu Line (located in Burkes Junction) (operating); Calico and Odessa Railroad (located in Calico Ghost Town) (operating); Court Flight (defunct); Frontier Village (defunct); Mine Train Through Nature's Wonderland (located in Disneyland) (separate 3 ft (914 mm) gauge railway named Disneyland Railroad, separate 3 ft (914 mm) gauge railway named Main Street Vehicles, and separate 2 ft (610 mm) gauge railway named Casey Jr. Circus Train also present; and separate 3 ft (914 mm) gauge railway named Jolly Trolley previously present) (defunct – park still operating); Pacific Coast Steamship Company (defunct); Santa Rosa Valley Railroad (private) (7 1/2 in (190.5 mm) gauge lines also present) (operating); Viewliner Train of Tomorrow (located in Disneyland) (separate 3 ft (914 mm) gauge railway named Disneyland Railroad, separate 3 ft (914 mm) gauge railway named Main Street Vehicles, and separate 2 ft (610 mm) gauge railway named Casey Jr. Circus Train also present; and separate 3 ft (914 mm) gauge railway named Jolly Trolley previously present) (defunct – park still operating); Yosemite Short Line Railway (defunct)
Florida	Fort Wilderness Railroad (located in Disney's Fort Wilderness Resort & Campground) (defunct – resort still operating)
Hawaii	Ahukini Terminal and Railway Company (defunct); Lihue Plantation Railroad (located at the Grove Farm Sugar Plantation Museum) (U.S. National Register of Historic Places status shared by four locomotives) (operating); Kauai Railway (defunct); Kilauea Sugar Plantation (defunct); Waianae Sugar Company (defunct)
Michigan	Harbor Springs Railway (defunct)
Minnesota	Minnesota River Valley Railroad (located in Valleyfair) (operating)
Montana	Alder Gulch Short Line Railroad (operating)
Nebraska	Omaha Zoo Railroad (located in Omaha's Henry Doorly Zoo & Aquarium) (operating)
Oregon	Washington Park & Zoo Railway (located in Oregon Zoo and Washington Park (Portland, Oregon)) (operating)
Pennsylvania	Cedar Creek Cannonball (located in Dorney Park & Wildwater Kingdom) (separate 2 ft (610 mm) gauge railway named Zephyr Railroad also present) (operating); Shay Railroad (located at the Rough and Tumble Engineers Historical Association) (separate 15 in (381 mm) gauge railway named Little Toot Railroad also present) (operating)

== Gallery ==
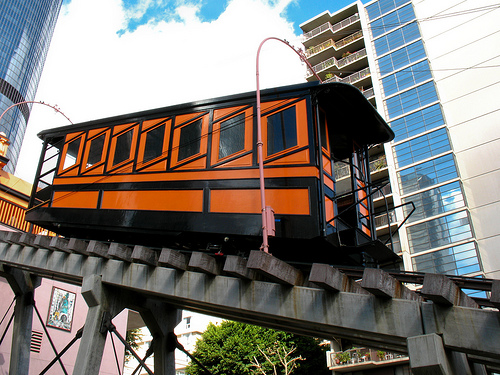
Angels Flight is a historic funicular railway located in Downtown Los Angeles.

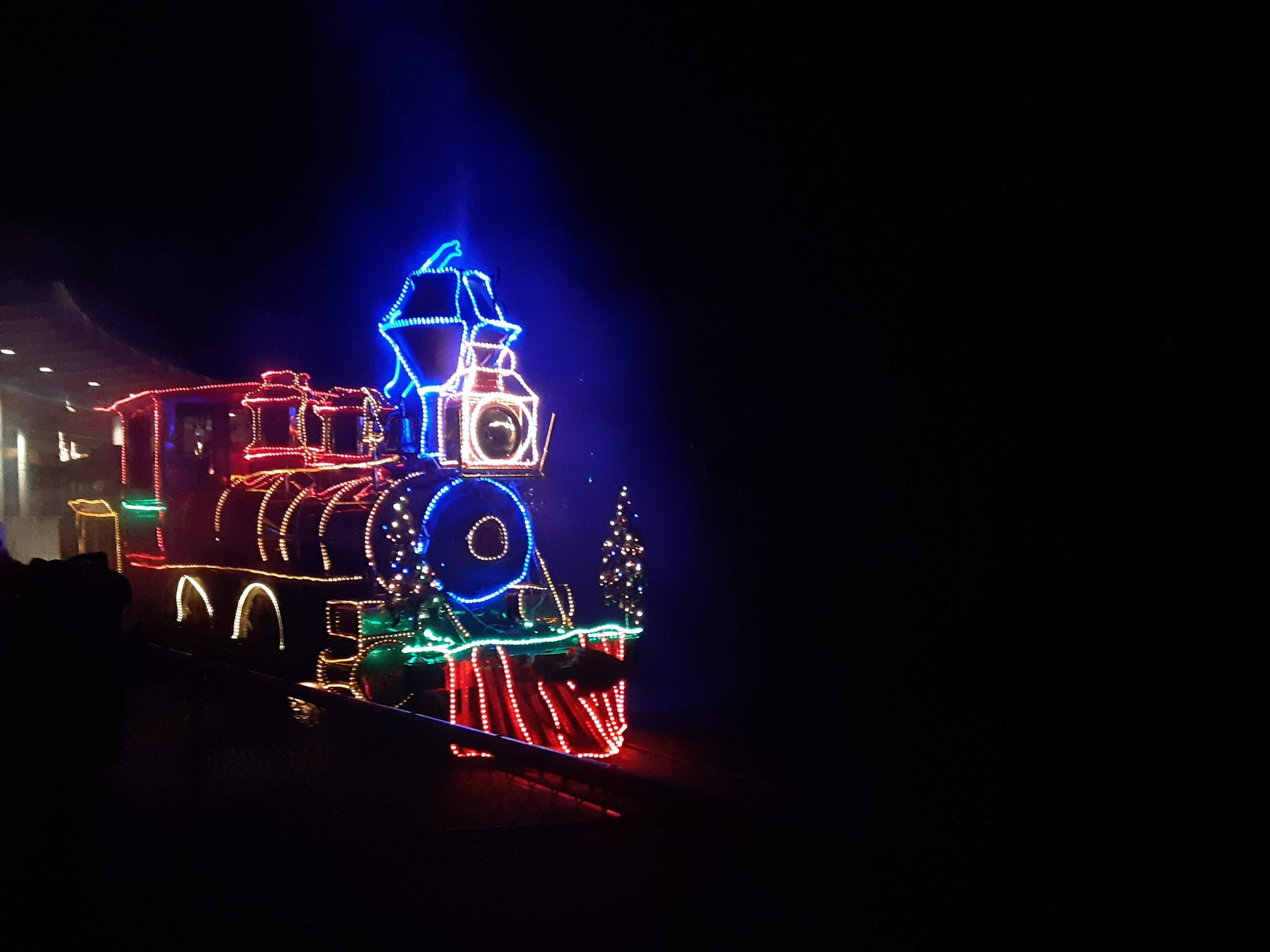
The Washington Park and Zoo Railway's #1 Steam locomotive decorated for Christmas.

== See also ==
- Narrow-gauge railroads in the United States
- Heritage railway
- 2 ft gauge railroads in the United States
- 2 ft 6 in gauge railways in the United Kingdom
- 3 ft gauge railroads in the United States
- Large amusement railways
- Three foot six inch gauge railways in the United States
