= Buttersville, Michigan =

Coordinates: 43°56′42″N 86°27′20″W

Buttersville, Michigan was a village in Mason County, Michigan near Ludington. It was established in 1880 as a company town serving the Butters & Peters sawmill. The Mason and Oceana Railroad, which brought logs to the mill, was built in 1886 and used Buttersville as its northwestern terminus. Buttersville had a post office until 1907.

== Sources ==
- Walter Romig, Michigan Place Names, p. 91.
