= Busch Gardens Railway =

Railroad in Busch Gardens Williamsburg

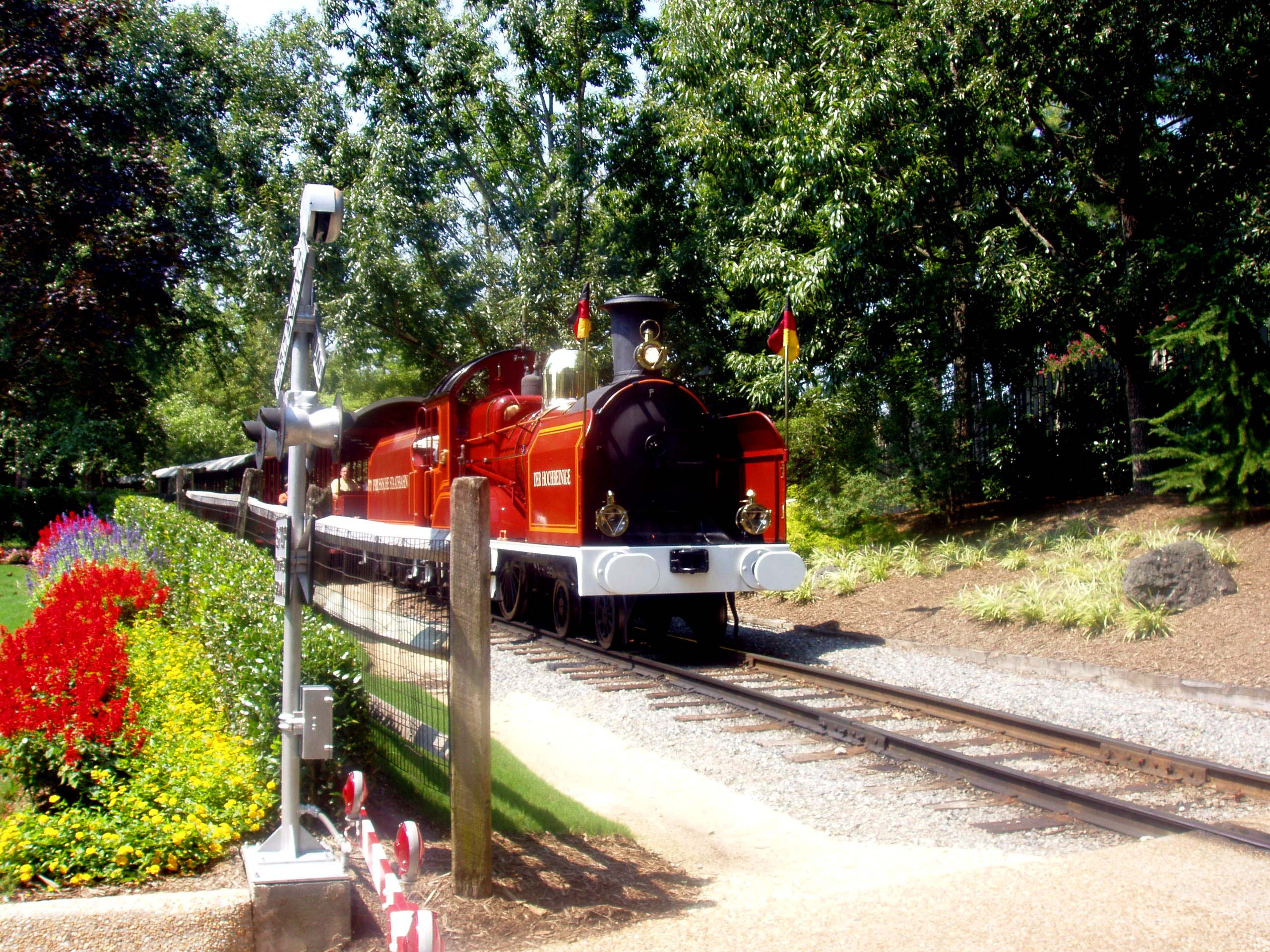
- Der Hochbeinige approaching a grade crossing in 2011

Overview
- Locale: Busch Gardens Williamsburg
- Dates of operation: 1975–

Technical
- Track gauge: 3 ft (914 mm)
- Length: 1.5 miles (2.4 km)

The Busch Gardens Railway is a 3 ft (914 mm) narrow-gauge amusement park heritage railroad attraction located within Busch Gardens Williamsburg amusement park in Williamsburg, Virginia. Opened in 1975, the railway is 1.5 miles (2.4 km) long, and has stations in the Heatherdowns, Festa Italia, and New France sections of the park. It features three trains pulled by 4-4-0 steam locomotives manufactured by Crown Metal Products.

== Description ==
The railway consists of a loop of 1.5 miles (2.4 km). Trains run in a clockwise direction, with a complete round trip taking approximately 20 minutes. There are two major bridges on the line, the Rhine River Trestle and the Loch Ness Trestle. The trains are inspected, serviced, and fueled at the Caribou Train Station in New France, which also contains two storage tracks to hold trains not currently in use. Caribou Station also has a water supply that the engine crews use to top off the locomotive's tenders every two laps of operation.

The railway operates three locomotives, each with their own train consisting of Narragansett-style excursion cars with a livery matching the locomotive.

== History ==
The railway opened in 1975, the same year as the park. It initially operated with two stations at Heatherdowns and New France. The line initially operated with two locomotives, Balmoral Castle and Der Hochbeinige.

In 1987, the park expanded, adding the Festa Italia area, and with it the infill Festa Station, the third (and final) station on the line. In 1997, a third locomotive was acquired from a defunct amusement park, and given an Alpine theme to match the newly-opened Alpengeist roller coaster.

On August 16, 2018, the Balmoral Castle caught on fire. One employee received minor injuries. The locomotive was subsequently repaired and returned to service.

== Locomotives ==
All three locomotives are propane-fueled steam engines.

Busch Gardens Railway locomotive details
Number	Name	Image	Wheel arrangement	Date built	Builder	Date entered service	Notes
17	Alpen Express		4-4-0 (American)	1972	Crown Metal Products	1997	Alpine-themed, painted in green livery. Originally built for the now-defunct Lakeside Amusement Park in Salem, Virginia, with American old-west theming. When acquired by Busch Gardens, the engine was rebuilt with a new smokestack, a new headlight, its pilot replaced with a snowplow, and its bell removed; however, it still retains a relatively American appearance compared to the other two engines.
238	Der Hochbeinige		4-4-0 (American)	1974	Crown Metal Products	1975	German-themed. Painted in red livery based on the Prussian state railways, with Preußische Staatsbahn painted on the tender.
661	Balmoral Castle		4-4-0 (American)	1974	Crown Metal Products	1975	Scottish-themed. Painted in blue livery based on the Caledonian Railway Company, with CR painted on the tender.
