= 3 ft 6 in gauge railroads in the United States =

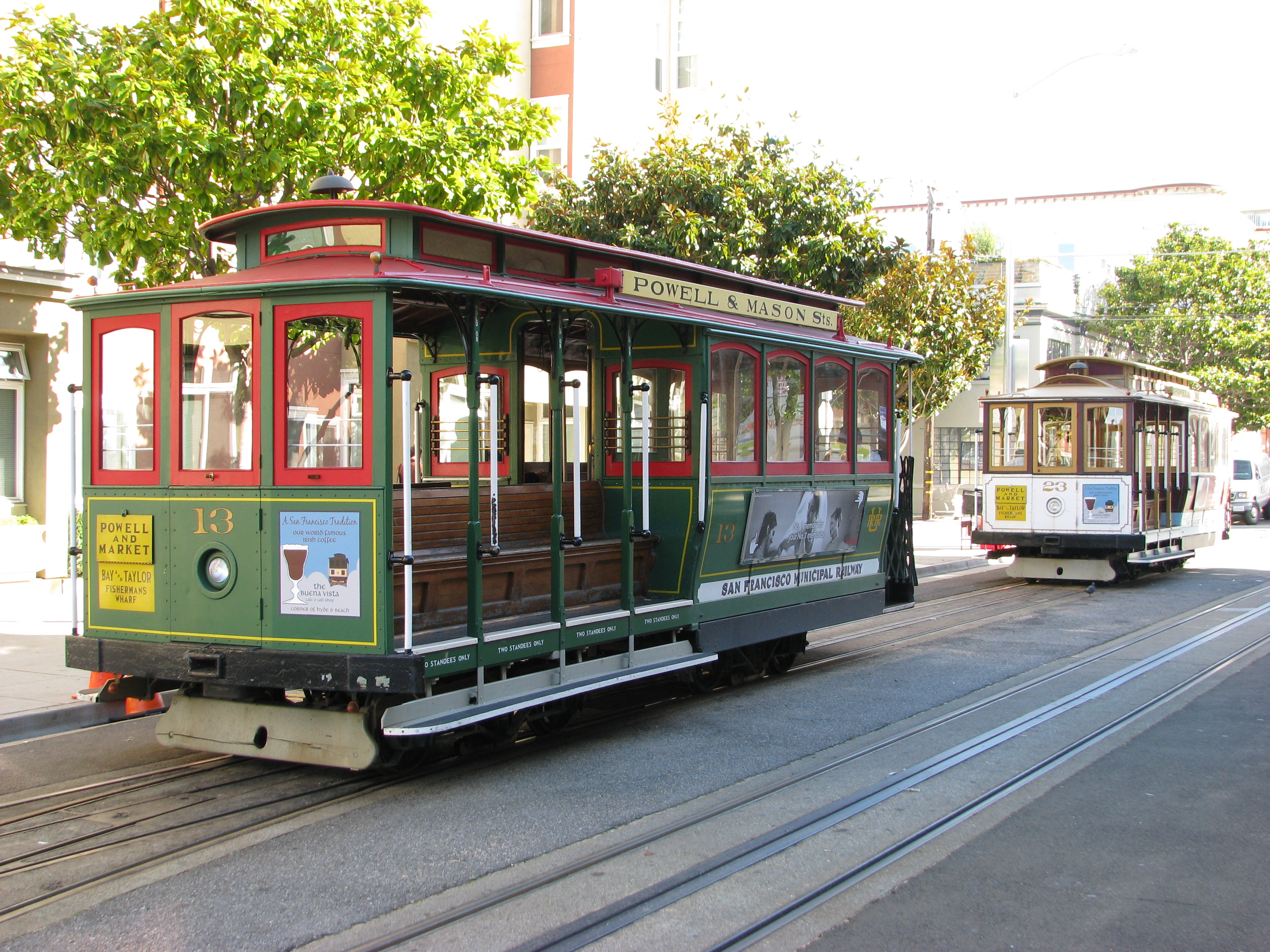
The San Francisco cable car system is the last manually-operated cable car system in the world.

3 ft 6 in (1,067 mm) gauge railroads in the United States are historical railroads, or are commonly used in underground coal mines. In the past, this gauge had been a popular choice for urban mass transit systems. 3 ft 6 in gauge railroads include:

== Railroads ==
State/territory	Railroad
Arkansas	Arkansas Midland Railroad (1872-1883, then converted to 3 ft gauge) (defunct); Brinkley, Helena and Indian Bay Railway (1889 to 1900, then converted to standard gauge) (defunct); Fort Smith Street Railway (defunct); Cotton Plant Railroad (1879-1881, then converted to 3 ft gauge)(defunct)
California	Cahuenga Valley Railroad (defunct); East Santa Cruz Street Railway (defunct); Los Angeles Railway (dual gauge lines with standard gauge track also present) (all dual gauge lines shared with Pacific Electric) (defunct); Mount Lowe Railway (partially converted to standard gauge) (U.S. National Register of Historic Places status) (defunct); Pacific Electric (standard gauge lines and dual gauge lines with standard gauge track also present) (all 3 ft 6 in (1,067 mm) gauge trackage was dual-gauged with standard gauge trackage) (all dual gauge lines shared with Los Angeles Railway) (defunct); Poway–Midland Railroad (operating); Horsecar system of Santa Rosa; San Diego Electric Railway (converted to standard gauge) (defunct); San Francisco cable car system (U.S. National Historic Landmark status) (operating); Southern California Railway Museum (standard gauge lines, 3 ft (914 mm) gauge lines, and dual gauge lines with standard gauge track and 3 ft 6 in (1,067 mm) gauge track also present) (operating)
Colorado	Denver Tramway (defunct); Henderson molybdenum mine (mostly defunct)
Connecticut	Danbury Street Railroad (defunct)
Illinois	Cairo Street Railway (defunct); Citizens Street Railroad (Springfield) (defunct)
Iowa	Peoples Street Railway (Centerville) (defunct); Muscatine Street Railway (defunct); Ottumwa Street Railroad (defunct); Olean Street Railway (defunct)
Kansas	Abeline Street Railway (defunct); Chetopa Street Car Company (defunct); Consolidated Street Railway (Cottonwood Falls) (defunct); Mankato Street Railway (defunct); McPherson Street Railway (defunct); Newton City Street Railway (defunct); Salina Railway (defunct); Wichita City Railway (defunct)
Maine	New Brunswick Railway (crossed into New Brunswick, Canada) (converted to standard gauge) (defunct)
Michigan	Muskegon Railway Company (defunct)
Minnesota	Duluth Street Railway (defunct); Minneapolis Street Railway Company (defunct); Winona City Railway (defunct)
Mississippi	Enterprise Street Railway (defunct)
Missouri	Carthage Horse Railway (defunct)
Nebraska	Covington, Columbus and Black Hills Railroad (defunct); Wymore and Blue Springs Railway (defunct)
New Jersey	Philadelphia and Atlantic City Railroad (converted to standard gauge) (defunct); Philadelphia and Atlantic City Railway (defunct); Pleasantville and Ocean City Railroad (converted to standard gauge) (defunct)
New York	Glen Falls, Sandy Hill and Fort Edward Street Railroad (defunct); City Island Railroad (defunct); Pelham Park Railroad Company (converted to a monorail) (defunct)
Ohio	Berea Street Railroad (defunct); Portsmouth Street Railroad (defunct); Zanesville and McIntire Street Railway (defunct)
Oregon	Former Portland, Oregon city streetcar system (operated by various companies at different times, including the Portland Street Railway Company; the Portland Railway, Light and Power Company; and the Portland Traction Company), last lines closed 1950. Except for the line to Vancouver, Washington (3 ft 6 in or 1,067 mm), the interurban lines of the same companies were standard gauge, as were a few of the city lines (in the southeast part of the city).
Pennsylvania	Mauch Chunk Switchback Railway (U.S. National Register of Historic Places status) (defunct); Pioneer Tunnel (operating)
Texas	Denison Street Railway (defunct); Longview and Junction Street Railway (defunct)

== See also ==
- Narrow-gauge railroads in the United States
- Heritage railway
- 2 ft gauge railroads in the United States
- 2 ft 6 in gauge railroads in the United States
- 3 ft gauge railroads in the United States
- 3 ft 6 in gauge railways in the United Kingdom
