= Serengeti Express =

Narrow gauge heritage railway and attraction at Busch Gardens in Tampa, Florida

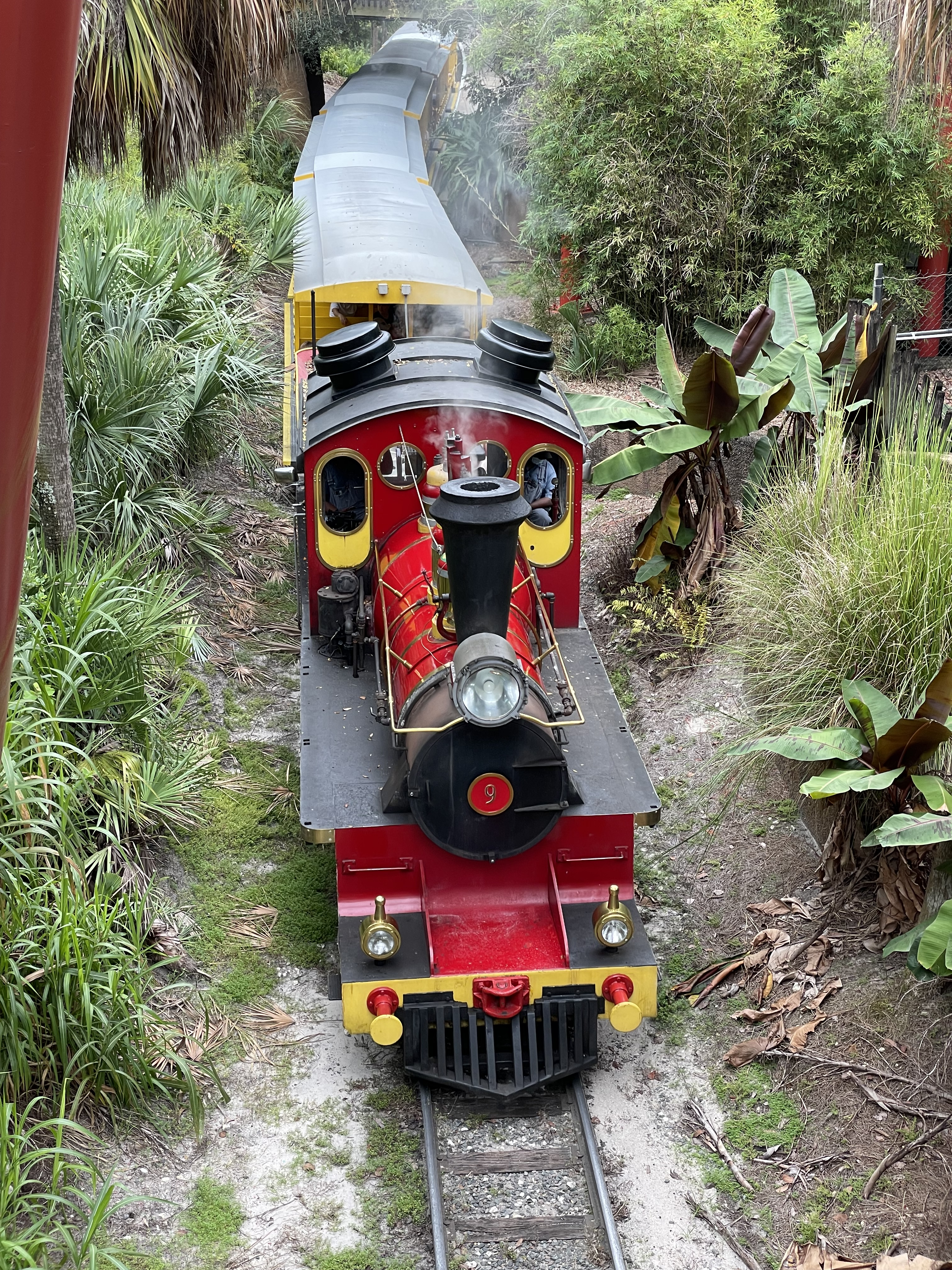
- The Serengeti Express in September 2022, with the No. 9 locomotive in the lead

Overview
- Locale: Busch Gardens Tampa Bay
- Dates of operation: 1971–present

Technical
- Track gauge: 3 ft (914 mm)
- Length: 2.2 miles (3.5 km)

The Serengeti Express, formerly known as the Trans Veldt Railway, is a 3 ft (914 mm) narrow gauge heritage railroad and amusement park attraction located within the Busch Gardens Tampa Bay amusement park in Tampa, Florida. Opened on July 3, 1971, the railway is about 2.2 miles (3.5 km) long, and has stations in the Nairobi, Congo, and Stanleyville sections of the park. It uses three trains pulled by one of four 4-4-0 type steam locomotives manufactured by Crown Metal Products.

== Description ==
The railway consists of a loop of about 2.2 miles (3.5 km). During the journey, the train will travel through the Serengeti Plain, where guests can see hundreds of African animals. There are stations in the Nairobi, Congo, and Stanleyville sections of the park. Two of the three stations contain a water supply that the engine crews use to top off the locomotive's tenders as necessary.

The railway operates four locomotives and three sets of open-sided passenger coaches. Two of the locomotives were built specifically for Busch Gardens and resemble locomotives used in Africa in the early 1890s. The other two locomotives, which were acquired from previous owners, have a more American appearance, but with slight modifications to match the African theming.

== Locomotives ==
All four locomotives are propane-fueled steam engines.

Serengeti Express locomotive details
Number	Image	Wheel arrangement	Date built	Builder	Date entered service	Status	Notes
4		4-4-0 (American)	1971	Crown Metal Products	1971	Out of service	1890s African-themed. Painted in green livery.
5		4-4-0 (American)	1970	Crown Metal Products	1980s	Operational	Painted in yellow livery. Originally built for Six Flags St. Louis in Eureka, Missouri.
9		4-4-0 (American)	1971	Crown Metal Products	1971	Out of service	1890s African-themed. Painted in red livery (originally blue).
601		4-4-0 (American)	1974	Crown Metal Products	1990s	Operational	Painted in green livery. Originally built for Kings Dominion in Doswell, Virginia.

== See also ==
- Florida Railroad Museum
- Walt Disney World Railroad
- Wildlife Express Train
