= Descanso, Alpine and Pacific Railway =

Heritage railroad in California

Coordinates: 32.820821°N 116.787761°W

Descanso, Alpine and Pacific Narrow Gauge Railway
Overview
- Locale: Alpine, California

Technical
- Track gauge: 2 ft (610 mm)

The Descanso, Alpine and Pacific Railway is a 2 ft (610 mm) narrow gauge heritage railroad owned and being relocated by the Pacific Southwest Railway Museum in Campo, California.

== History ==
The railroad was owned by Roy Athey and it opened in Alpine in May 1990. This little operation was a sole proprietorship and has one locomotive, a 1935 Brookville Equipment Corporation unit. The railroad had three stations; Shade, El Pozo and High Pass. The railway offered free train rides and historical narration to the public on most Sundays.

Athey built the railroad in his backyard with his friends. He operated it free of charge to anyone who wanted to ride it. In January 2018, he donated key parts of the railroad to the Pacific Southwest Railway Museum due to his inability to continue running the train.
