= Mason and Oceana Railroad =

Defunct railroad in the U.S. state of Michigan

Overview
- Headquarters: Ludington, Michigan
- Locale: Michigan
- Dates of operation: 1887–1909

Technical
- Track gauge: 3 ft (914 mm)

The Mason and Oceana Railroad (M&O) was a short (35 mi or 56 km) common carrier, 3 ft (914 mm) narrow gauge logging railroad in the U.S. state of Michigan. Organized in 1887 and in operation from 1887 until 1909, it served the counties of Mason and Oceana in the northwestern quarter of Michigan's Lower Peninsula in the late 19th and early 20th centuries.

== History ==
=== Ludington-based short line ===
The Mason and Oceana was originally built by the Butters family, at a cost of $178,000, to help exploit the old-growth timber resources of this part of Michigan. The M&O's service area, in southeastern Mason County and northern Oceana County, lacked the rivers used in other parts of Michigan to transport heavy logs to sawmills. Instead of water transport, the M&O allowed local loggers to have logs transported to the Butters & Peters Salt and Lumber Company sawmill at Buttersville, across the Pere Marquette Lake from Ludington. The settlement around the sawmill was founded by the company, hence the name The short line used geared Shay locomotives.

The railroad was chartered as a common carrier in 1887, which meant that it operated a public passenger service. The first section of 21 miles (34 km) opened in the same year, southeast to near Crystal Valley. In the following year, workers extended the line to a location named Stetson, 27 miles (43.5 km) from Buttersfield. This terminus was to rename itself Walkerville in 1898.

The Mason and Oceana initiated expansion plans to extend its common carrier line to Hesperia in 1901, but the extension was never completed. In stages, it reached Goodrich at 32 miles (51.5 km) (not to be confused with the Goodrich, Michigan located in Genesee County). and Maple at 35 miles (61 km) where it arrived in 1903. This place was also called Maple Range. The common carrier service got no further. At its peak, the railroad operated on a 32-mile-long (51 km) main line that ran southeastward from its sawmill hub, which was located at a point on the other side of the river estuary from Ludington. This meant that the Mason & Oceana was an isolated line with no connection between it and the wider railroad network of Michigan.

From Buttersville, the route ran southeast with passenger stops at Riverton, Wiley, Fern, Peachville, Crystal Valley (the station was to the east of the settlement), Lake, Walkerville, Goodrich and the railhead at Maple (also known as Maple Range, and called Beaver in 1909).

After the first-growth timber resources of the Mason and Oceana's service area had been exhausted, there was no longer any reason for the tiny railroad to continue in operation for its entire length. The line from Walkerville to Maple Range was abandoned in 1906, and the rest was due to be closed down in 1908.

=== Grand Rapids and Northwestern Railroad ===
However, that was not the end of the story. The Grand Rapids and Northwestern Railroad company had been incorporated in that year, 1908, to build a trunk line from Grand Rapids to a new car ferry port to compete with the well-established one run by the Pere Marquette Railway at Ludington. Car ferries would have sailed directly to Milwaukee, and the new road would have connected with the New York Central Railroad system at Grand Rapids.

The new company bought out the entire stock of the Mason and Oceana (under common carrier law, the railroad company had to be legally separate from the Butters & Peters lumber company) for $300,000 in February 1908, and immediately abandoned the line from Wiley to Walkerville. It began converting and grading the route from Wiley, and 8 miles had been completed to Crystal Valley by the following year.

In August 1909, a fire destroyed the lumber company sawmill and that was the end of any log-hauling operations on the truncated line. Unfortunately, the GR&N scheme then failed and the remaining rails were scavenged for scrap in 1912.

== See also ==
- Ludington and Northern Railway
