= Yosemite Short Line Railway =

Defunct railroad in California

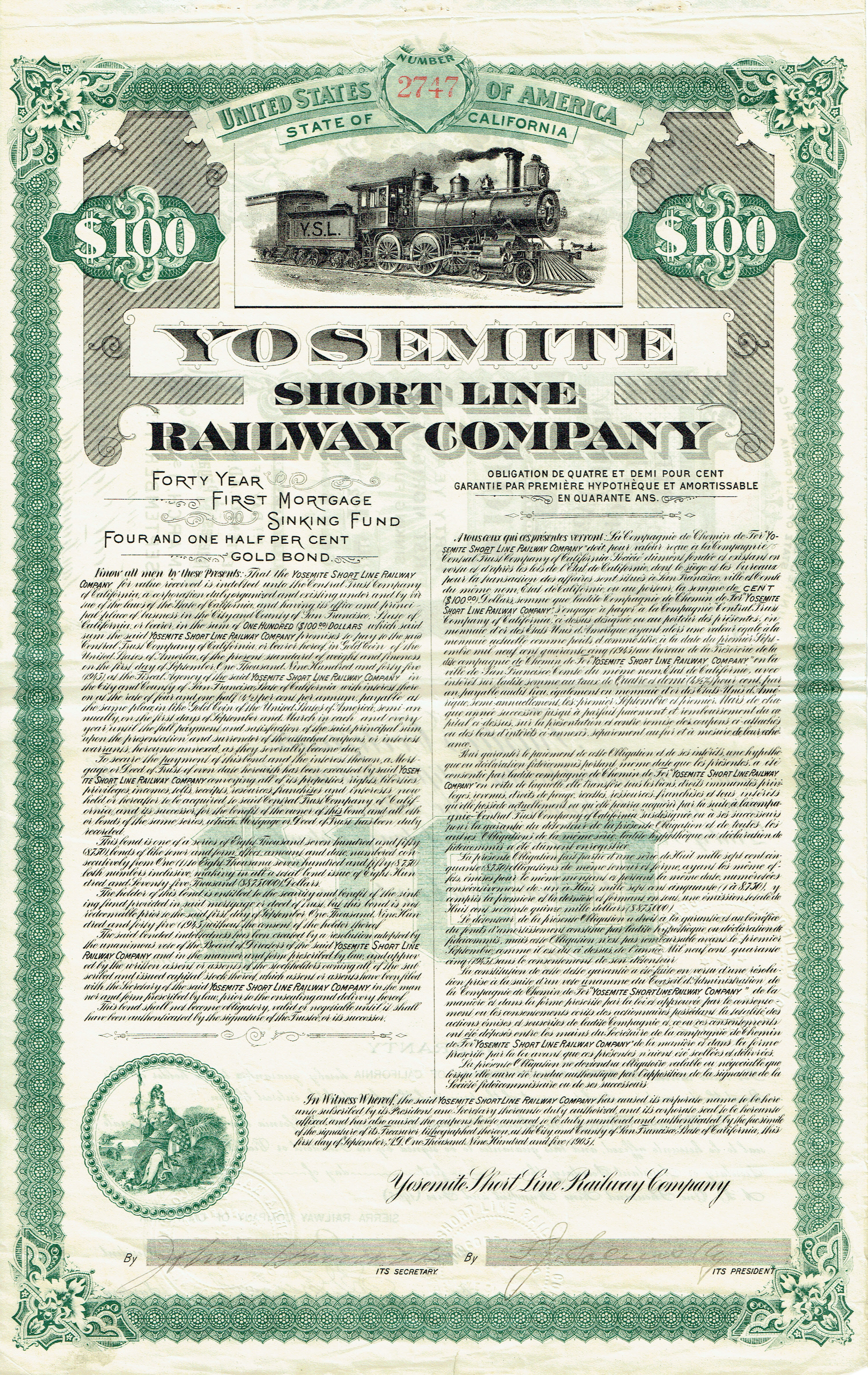
Bond of the Yosemite Short Line Railway Company from 1 September 1905

The Yosemite Short Line Railway was a 2 ft 6 in (762 mm) narrow gauge railway constructed in the Yosemite region of California. The plan was to construct a railway 60 miles (97 km) long, serving logging interests and tourists visiting the Yosemite National Park. Construction commenced in 1905 but construction was abandoned due to the financial crisis caused by the 1906 San Francisco earthquake, with only 8.5 miles (13.7 km) constructed. The railway was abandoned by 1917. Locomotive power was provided by two Porter 0-4-0T steam locomotives.
