= Leesburg Transfer Company =

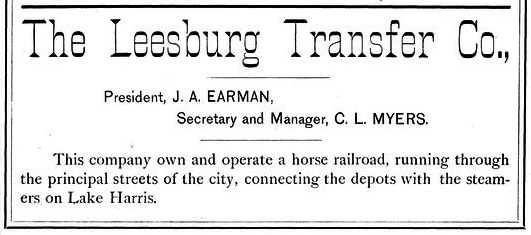
- Leesburg Transfer ad from "Webb's Directory"

The Leesburg Transfer Company was incorporated October 31, 1884, in Leesburg, Florida, by Joseph A. Earman, to build and operate two miles of horse railroad in Leesburg connecting the various railroad depots with the steamer landing on Lake Harris. Earman was President, and Charles L. Myers was Secretary and Manager. Earman was also the proprietor of the Grand Central Hotel and a livery and sale stable at the corner of Magnolia and 3rd streets. A picture in the Florida State Archives shows 3 ft (914 mm) narrow gauge tracks in Main Street in the 1880s.

== Bibliography ==
- Webb, Wanton S. (1886). Webb's Jacksonville and consolidated directory of the representative cities of east and south Florida – via University of Florida George A. Smathers Libraries' Digital Collection.
