= Wildlife Express Train =

Railroad at Disney's Animal Kingdom

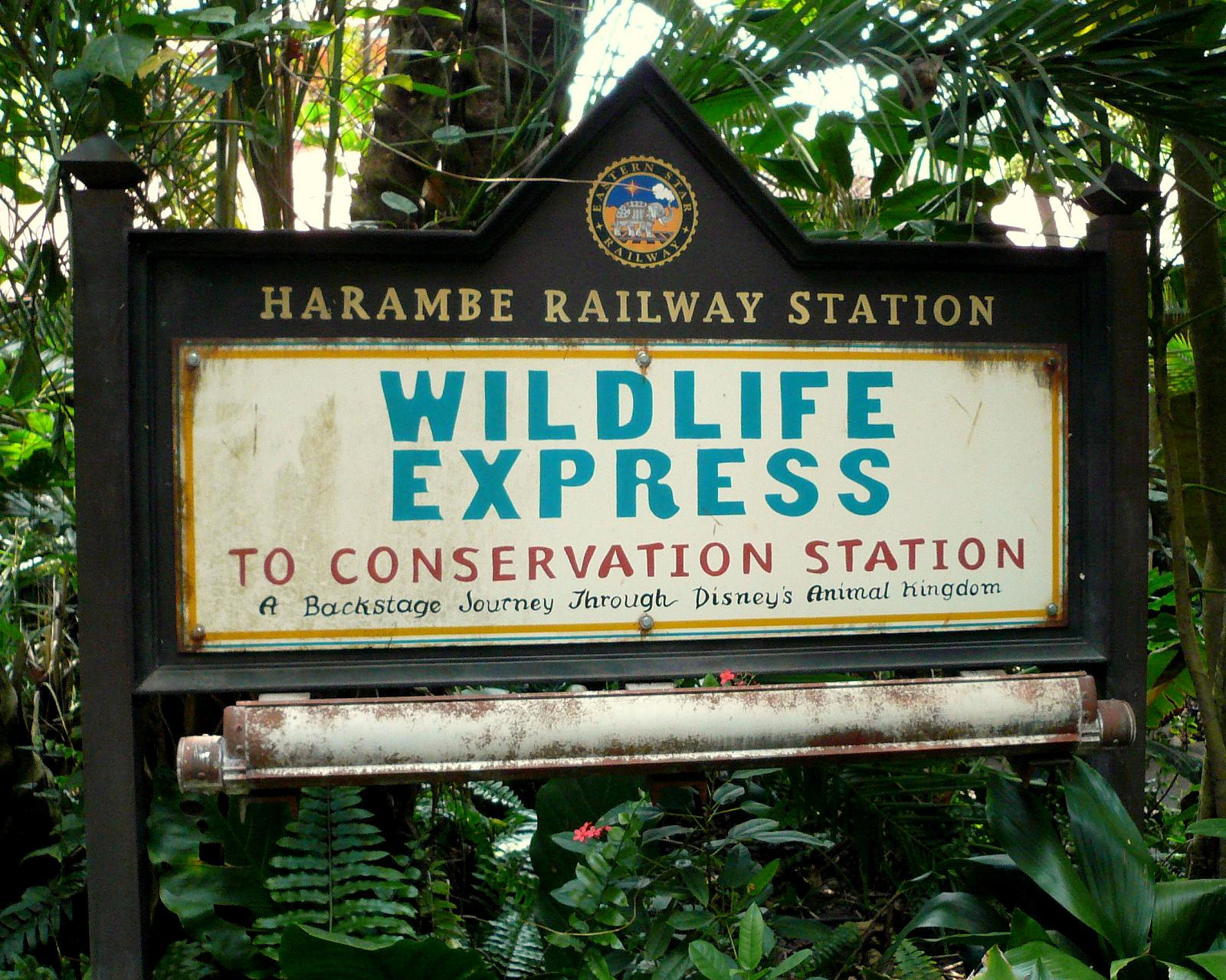
- Entrance sign at Harambe Station, pictured in 2008.

Disney's Animal Kingdom
- Area: Africa
- Coordinates: 28°21′35″N 81°35′28″W
- Status: Operating
- Opening date: April 22, 1998

Ride statistics
- Attraction type: Heritage railway
- Manufacturer: Severn Lamb
- Designer: Walt Disney Imagineering
- Theme: African railway
- Length: 6,336 ft (1,931 m)
- Vehicle type: Train
- Vehicles: 3 steam-outline locomotives; 10 passenger cars
- Riders per vehicle: 250
- Rows: 2
- Duration: 12 minutes
- Track gauge: 3 ft (914 mm)
- Ride host: Robert Irwin (voice; 2026–present)
- Wheelchair accessible

The Wildlife Express Train is an African themed 3 ft (914 mm) narrow gauge heritage railroad at Disney's Animal Kingdom in Walt Disney World, which opened on April 22, 1998. Its route is 1.2 miles (1.9 km) long and takes guests on a trip between the Africa and Conservation Station sections.

== History ==
Early plans for Disney's Animal Kingdom called for a railway that would have taken guests through the Savannah plains. This idea was modified, however, when concerns about the safety of the animals was raised. Instead, Disney decided to create a railway that would take guests from the Village of Harambe in the Africa section of the park to the Conservation Station section of the park. Imagineer George McGinnis came out of retirement to design the locomotives for the attraction. They were designed to give guests the impression that the trains had been traveling through Africa for a hundred years, collecting grime and rust along the way. According to imagineer Joe Rohde, the idea was to create a look for vehicles "that would be seen today in Africa and Asia, long after their original use in Europe in the late 1800s."

The locomotives and rail cars themselves were built in 1997 by Severn Lamb, Ltd. in Alcester, England. Production of the locomotives was overseen by Imagineers Bob Harpur and Joel Fritsche. On April 22, 1998, the Wildlife Express Train opened with the rest of Disney's Animal Kingdom.

The Wildlife Express Train and Rafiki's Planet Watch were both temporarily closed on October 21, 2018, for refurbishment and reopened on July 11, 2019. The train and Rafiki's Planet Watch both closed again on February 23, 2026, in order to make way for a new experience based on the Australian television series Bluey. The Wildlife Express Train reopened on May 26, 2026, along with new on-board narration by conservationist Robert Irwin on the journey from the Africa section of the theme park to Conservation Station. The Rafiki's Planet Watch theme, the Animation Academy, as well as the petting zoo were all removed from Conservation Station and replaced with "Bluey's Wild World", an interactive show featuring Bluey and Bingo, and a kangaroo and wallaby exhibit, called Jumping Junction, which also opened the same day.

== Experience ==
The Wildlife Express Train is themed to the fictitious Eastern Star Railway, running between Lusaka, Nairobi, and Kisangani. Like most other Disney rail attractions, the railway is built to a 3 ft (914 mm) narrow gauge, which is smaller than the 1,000 mm (3 ft 3 3/8 in) metre gauge currently used on East African railways.

The train takes guests from Harambe Station in the Africa section to Conservation Station. One full journey takes about twelve minutes to complete: seven minutes from Harambe Station to Conservation Station, and five minutes from Conservation Station to Harambe Station. During the ride, portions of the Animal Kingdom backlot can be seen, including animal holding buildings for rhinos and elephants, among other animals. The roundhouse where the trains are stored is also visible.

== Rolling stock ==
The Wildlife Express Train operates three 2-4-2DH steam-outline locomotives built by Severn Lamb in 1997 before the park's opening the following year. The locomotives are based on the Lancashire & Yorkshire Railway's Class 5 and Class 6 locomotives in England, designed by John Aspinall and built in 1898 at the railway's Horwich Works. There are also two sets of train cars, each consisting of five coaches with a total seating capacity of 250 people per train.

All rolling stock for the Wildlife Express were built brand-new, but are painted to look dated and weathered, in order to give the impression that the trains have been running for many decades. The two train sets are decorated with various bins and items on the roof, simulating the luggage that passengers have brought aboard the train.

Wildlife Express Train rolling stock details
| Number | Image | Wheel arrangement | Date built | Builder | Date entered service | Status | Notes |
|---|---|---|---|---|---|---|---|
| 00174 | | 2-4-2DH | 1997 | Severn Lamb | April 21, 1998 | Operational | – |
| 02594 R. Baba Harpoor | | 2-4-2DH | 1997 | Severn Lamb | April 21, 1998 | Operational | Carries the name R. Baba Harpoor in honor of Disney Imagineer Bob Harpur. |
| 04982 | | 2-4-2DH | 1997 | Severn Lamb | April 21, 1998 | Operational | – |

== See also ==
- Serengeti Express
- Rail transport in Walt Disney Parks and Resorts
