= Liberty–White Railroad =

1902–1921 Mississippi railroad

The Liberty–White Railroad was chartered on December 22, 1902, and acquired the 3 ft (914 mm) narrow gauge logging railroad of the J.J. White Lumber Company running southwest from McComb, Mississippi. A branch of this logging railroad was converted to 4 ft 8 1/2 in (1,435 mm) standard gauge and extended to the Amite County seat of Liberty and opened July 20, 1904.

A 4 ft 8 1/2 in (1,435 mm) standard gauge branch was also built eastward from the J.J. White mill in South McComb to New Holmesville in 1907 and extended to Tylertown in 1912. J.J. White was notable for being one of the first Mississippi lumbermen to operate a private logging railroad in 1879.

The Liberty–White Railroad began experiencing financial difficulties after the J.J. White Lumber Company mill in South McComb closed in 1912 and was moved to Columbia, Mississippi. The 3 ft (914 mm) gauge line running southwest to Keiths was immediately abandoned, and the branch to Tylertown was abandoned December 1918.

The remaining 4 ft 8 1/2 in (1,435 mm) standard gauge line from South McComb to Liberty was finally abandoned per Interstate Commerce Commission order September 23, 1921.
