= Allegan and Lake Shore Railroad =

The Allegan and Lake Shore Railroad is a defunct railroad which operated in Allegan County, Michigan during the 1880s. The company incorporated on May 30, 1883, by W.G. Dewing & Sons, to construct and operate 22-mile (35 km) line from Allegan westward to Lake Michigan. The primary purpose of this line was to support local timber operations. On April 15, 1885, the A&LS completed a 3 ft (914 mm) narrow gauge 5-mile (8.0 km) stretch from the Kalamazoo River at Allegan to Swan Creek; the line went no further and was abandoned in 1889, timber resources in the area being exhausted.
