= Southern Pacific (narrow gauge) =

Network of three-foot (914 mm) narrow-gauge railroad lines

The Southern Pacific narrow-gauge system was a network of 3 ft (914 mm) narrow-gauge railroad lines operated by the Southern Pacific Railroad (SP) in the western United States. It consisted of two lines acquired in the early 20th century, running from western Nevada into eastern California and southern Oregon.

The first, the former Carson and Colorado Railway, comprised 300 miles of single track running south from the Southern Pacific main line between Mound House, Nevada (outside Carson City) and Keeler, California. The line was originally built by the Virginia and Truckee Railroad, and was purchased by the Southern Pacific in 1900, when the line made enough profit to repay the purchase price within one month. In later years the line was not as profitable, although it was enough to justify dieselizing the line, one of the few such cases in the United States. The narrow-gauge service ended in 1960.

The second line was organized in 1882, as the Nevada and Oregon, and later became the Nevada–California–Oregon Railway (NCO). It was acquired by the Southern Pacific in 1925. It comprised 200 miles of single track running north from Reno, Nevada to Lakeview, Oregon. Plans to continue the line into points in Oregon were never realized. The line was converted to standard gauge in 1928, and its 3 ft (914 mm) gauge equipment was sold, though several locomotives subsequently ran on the southern limb of the network, the former Carson and Colorado line.

Several engines and cars of the SP narrow gauge have been preserved in museums, such as the Laws Railroad Museum, Eastern California Museum, Southern California Railway Museum and Nevada County Narrow Gauge Railroad & Transportation Museum.
