= Fulton Chain Railroad (Peg Leg) =

The Fulton Chain Railroad, also known as the "Peg Leg", was a 3 ft (914 mm) narrow gauge private railroad connecting Moose River to Minnehaha, New York, in the Fulton Chain of Lakes. The line was built in 1888, and ceased running in 1892. The line was eight miles (13 km) long, and had wooden rails, hence the nickname "Peg Leg". It ran only during the summer months to carry vacationers to the Fulton Chain of Lakes.
