= New Life Ranch Frontier Cove =

Christian children's summer camp

Coordinates: 36.384810°N 95.140366°W

- Interactive map of New Life Ranch Frontier Cove
- Location: Adair, Oklahoma, United States
- Opened: 1986
- Operated by: New Life Ranch

New Life Ranch Frontier Cove (formerly Dry Gulch, U.S.A.) is a Western-themed Christian children's summer camp located on the western edge of Lake Hudson near Adair, Oklahoma.

== Overview ==
The New Life Ranch Frontier Cove facility, originally named Dry Gulch, U.S.A., was founded by Church on the Move senior pastor Willie George in 1986. At this time, he was producing The Gospel Bill Show, a Christian values-based television show that used the Western-themed town on the property as a set. Apart from religious services, camp activities include traditional ones such as basketball, obstacle courses, swimming, canoeing, and inner tube riding; and non-traditional ones such as carousel rides, bumper cars, and go-karts.

== The Christmas Train ==
The New Life Ranch Frontier Cove property, when it was owned by Church on the Move, had The Christmas Train (a.k.a.: the Dry Gulch & Silver City Railroad), a 3 ft (914 mm) narrow gauge heritage railroad opened in 1996, which utilized genuine steam locomotives and ran during the weeks leading up to Christmas. Each year, The Christmas Train entertained over 50,000 visitors. It was discontinued after the 2016 season.

=== Steam locomotives ===
The Christmas Train had three propane-fired steam locomotives, two of which are historic. Their details are listed in the table below.

Number	Wheel arrangement	Year built	Builder	Notes
7	0-4-0	1942	H.K. Porter, Inc.	
43	0-4-0	1928	H.K. Porter, Inc.	
552	4-4-0	1974	Crown Metal Products	Originally built for the Old Dominion Line, the now-defunct railroad in the Kings Dominion amusement park in Doswell, Virginia. Since sold to Worlds of Fun.

== For sale ==
In February 2016, Church on the Move, the owner of Dry Gulch, U.S.A. and The Christmas Train, announced that the property was put up for sale with the hope of selling it to a similar organization. In August 2018, the camp was purchased by New Life Ranch and renamed "New Life Ranch Frontier Cove". That same month, Church on the Move was in the process of selling the Christmas Train to a group outside of Oklahoma.

== See also ==
- New Life Ranch Flint Valley
- Six Gun Territory
