= Lakeside Amusement Park (Virginia) =

Former amusement park in Salem, Virginia

Lakeside
- Interactive map of Lakeside
- Location: Salem, Virginia, U.S.
- Coordinates: 37.296413°N 80.028942°W
- Opened: 1920
- Closed: 1986

Attractions
- Total: In 1985, approximately 20-25

Lakeside Amusement Park was an amusement park located in Salem, Virginia, neighboring Roanoke, at the intersection of U.S. Route 460 (East Main Street in Salem) and State Route 419 (Electric Road in Salem). The park was named after a very large (300 feet long, 125 feet wide) swimming pool which was opened on the site in 1920. The pool was surrounded by a beach and quickly became a favorite summer retreat for residents of Roanoke and Salem. Amusement park rides were added to the facility within a few years of its opening. The park also included a pavilion, which hosted celebrity concerts. Frequent performers included country artists Tom T. Hall and Conway Twitty.

Nearby Roanoke College also had use of the park when it was closed in the winter as an area for its men's lacrosse team to use for practice.

== Decline and closure ==
The pool eventually declined in popularity as home swimming pools became popular and after courts mandated desegregation. In 1967, the pool was filled in as part of an expansion project, the highlight of which was a new wooden roller coaster named the Shooting Star, which replaced the Wildcat. Lakeside remained a popular destination through the 1970s and early 1980s, though larger parks such as Kings Dominion and Busch Gardens were beginning to draw away visitors. Nearby Mason Creek inundated the park during the flood of November 1985. Somewhat surprisingly, the park was able to repair the damage and even construct new attractions for the 1986 season. Unfortunately, that year a maintenance worker, a 19-year old named Tom Austin, was struck and killed by the roller coaster, due to the noise of a weed trimmer preventing him from hearing the roller coaster as it came down a hill at a high speed, during a test run.

The park's updates had failed to reverse the decline in attendance and revenues. The park also occupied a very valuable parcel of real estate at the intersection of two highways only a mile south of Interstate 81. Lakeside Amusement Park closed its gates for the last time on October 19, 1986.

== Aftermath ==
Within a few years, the site was the location of a strip mall, named Lakeside Plaza, with Kroger and several other stores and restaurants. This neighborhood of Salem is still commonly referred to as Lakeside and several churches and businesses bear the name.

The closure of Lakeside led to the creation of the Salem Fair in 1988. This event, which has free admission, runs annually for ten days in late June to early July. Estimated attendance in most years averages around 300,000, which makes it the second largest fair in Virginia, trailing only the State Fair of Virginia in Doswell, Virginia.

== Rides as of 1985 ==
- Shooting Star – John Allen Out and Back Roller Coaster
- Astro Liner – Motion Simulator
- Ferris wheel – Eli Bridge Ferris wheel
- Western Railroad – Crown Metal Products 3 ft (914 mm) narrow gauge. Steam Train now at Busch Gardens Williamsburg.
- Paratrooper – Paratrooper Ride
- Monster – Eyerly Monster
- Mini Firetrucks – Kiddie Ride
- Mini Cars – Kiddie Ride
- Horse Carts – Kiddie Ride
- Scooters – Kiddie Ride
- Rocket Ships – Kiddie Ride
- Carousel
- Casino – A Trabant Ride
- Scrambler – Eli Bridge Scrambler
- Tilt-A-Whirl
- Avalanche – Flying Bobs Ride
- Bumper Cars
- Flying Scooters
- Giant Slide
- Paddle Boats
- Junior Ferris wheel
- Skyway
- Spider
- Cloud Nine
- Umbrellas
- The Whip

== Former rides as of 1985 ==
- Miniature Train (CP Huntington) – Closed 1983
- Cloud Nine – Round Up – Closed 1980
- Flight Thru Space – Dark Ride – Closed 1979 Rep. by Astro Liner.
- Wild Cat – Roller Coaster – Closed 1967
- Skylift – went over parking lot to where McDonalds is located now.
- Wild Mouse – Closed sometime before 1974.
