= Waianae Sugar Company =

First sugar plantation in Hawaii

Coordinates: 21.4424364°N 158.1862819°W

The Waianae Sugar Company, founded in 1878, was the first major sugar plantation on Oahu, Hawaii.

== History ==
In 1878, Judge Hermann Widemann planted his first crop in Wai'anae, eleven years before the creation of the Oahu Railway and Land Company, and seventeen years before the OR&L would reach the sugar mill. Waianae Sugar Company's plantation cultivated land in three valleys, Makaha, Lualualei, and Wai'anae. Having a 2 ft 6 in (762 mm) narrow gauge railway line, it was the only sugar plantation on the island whose tracks could not connect to the OR&L's tracks. Despite struggles for water, this company lasted 69 years, closing down in 1947, the same year as the Oahu Railway's closure.

By 1890, sugar cane was planted on 600 acres with a yield of 2,500 tons. The company had 350 workers and three locomotives to transport the cane over 12 miles of narrow gauge track.

== Locomotives ==
The first locomotive was imported from John Fowler & Co. at Leeds, England. It had to be disassembled and re-assembled to get it ashore. Only then it was noted that it did not match the 2 ft 6 in (762 mm) narrow gauge track. The undercarriage had to be dismantled, machined to size, and then commissioned.
