= Crown Metal Products =

Former steam locomotive manufacturer

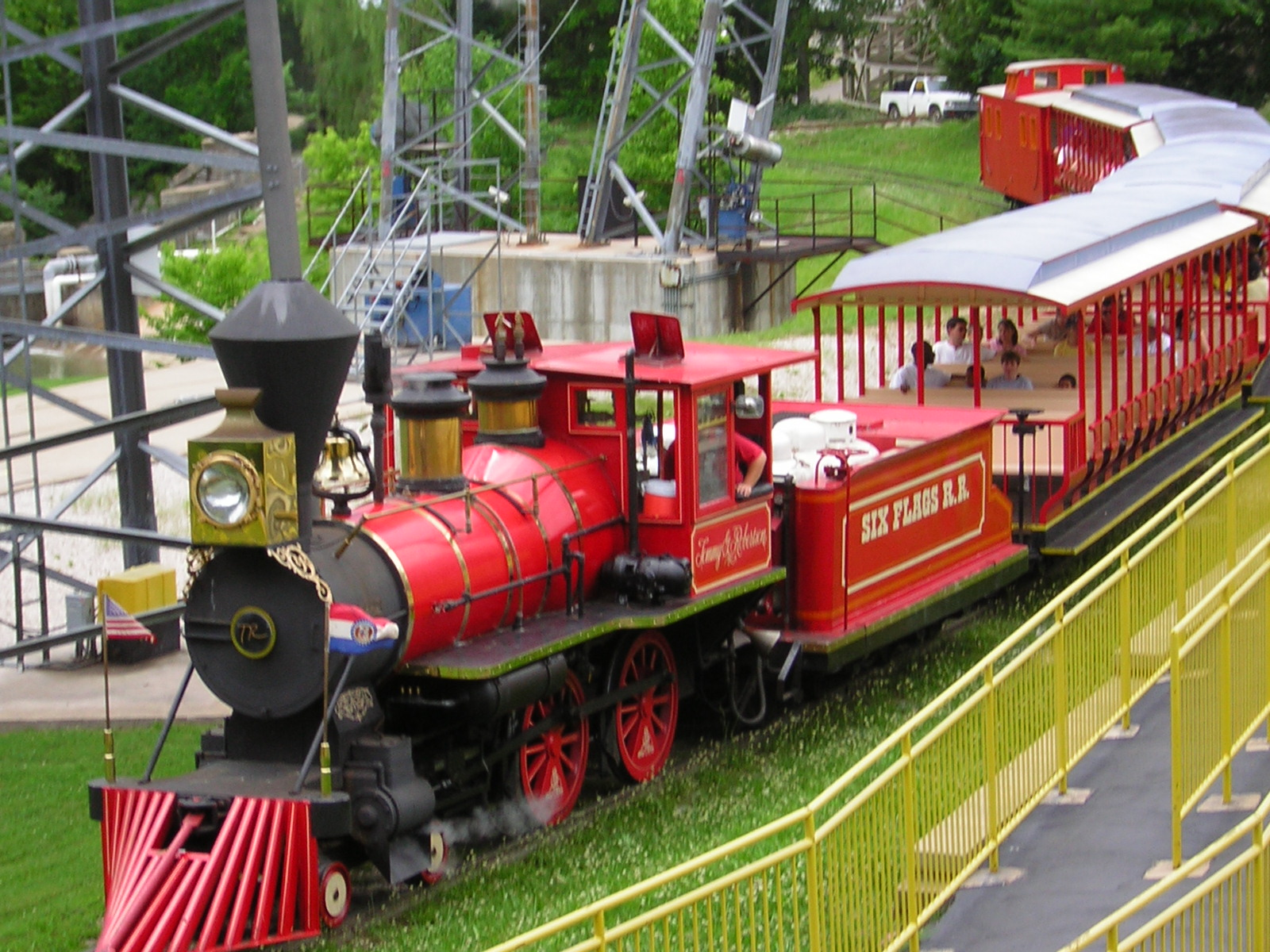
- A typical 3 ft (914 mm) gauge Crown Metal Products 4-4-0 locomotive at Mid-America Adventure
- Industry: Ridable miniature railway
- Founded: 1946
- Founder: Ken Williams
- Defunct: 1989
- Fate: Bankruptcy
- Headquarters: Wyano, Pennsylvania, U.S.
- Products: Locomotives, passenger cars

Crown Metal Products was a manufacturer of railroad rolling stock based in Wyano, Pennsylvania. The company was founded by Ken Williams in 1946 and initially sold pot cleaners and then electric fence wires and other products. In 1959, the company began to transition into producing narrow gauge locomotives, a personal interest of Williams. The company went on to produce steam locomotives and passenger cars of various sizes for amusement park railroads. The firm ceased production in 1989; however, much of its rolling stock continues to operate at various locations around the world.

== Background ==
The firm has its roots in 1946, when Ken Williams, a machinist and railway enthusiast of Wyano, Pennsylvania, founded Crown Metal Products in Sutersville, Pennsylvania to produce pot cleaners. In the 1950s, Williams purchased a miniature steam locomotive, presumed to have been built by the Cagney Bros., and decided to construct his own locomotive of the same design. In the summer of 1959, Williams was visited by Gaylon and Sallie Borders of Flora, Illinois, who had taken an interest in his locomotive. Gaylon then placed an order for a locomotive of Williams' design, which would become the first locomotive to be built by the Crown Metal Products. This locomotive was given the name "Little Toot", and over the following decade, more locomotives would be produced for parks, zoos, and other amusement attractions.

== Designs ==
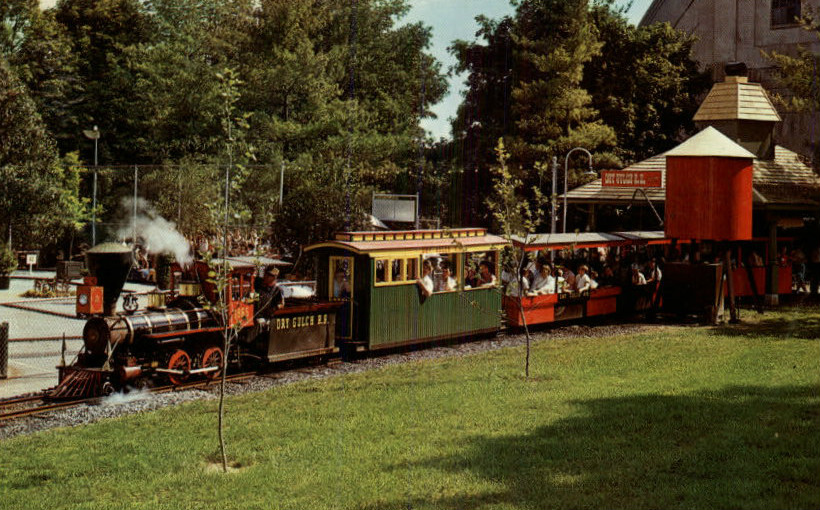
A 2 ft (610 mm) gauge Crown Metal Products train in Hersheypark in 1966

The locomotives produced by Crown were narrow gauge live steam locomotives of various sizes, ranging from 15 in (381 mm) gauge to 3 ft (914 mm) gauge. All locomotives built were of the 4-4-0 wheel arrangement, with the exception of Carowinds locomotive no. 1 "Melodia", a 2-6-2 rebuilt from a 0-6-2T built by Porter in 1897. Most locomotives were styled after the typical American 4-4-0 type locomotives of the mid 19th century, with most having two domes, similar to the Jupiter, The General, and the Inyo. However, some of the 3 ft (914 mm) gauge offerings featured three domes in the vein of locomotives such as the William Crooks and the Countess of Dufferin. The locomotives were built to burn coal or wood as fuel, though many were later converted to propane or compressed air. Busch Gardens Williamsburg purchased two 3 ft (914 mm) gauge locomotives that, while built to the same specifications as the typical Crown offerings, were given European style appearances. Similarly, their sister park in Tampa bought two locomotives of the same size, these having African styling.

Besides steam locomotives, Crown also built 2 ft 6 in (762 mm) diesel-hydraulic steam outline locomotives, of which two are known to exist. One operates at Valleyfair in Minnesota, and the other operates at Dorney Park in Pennsylvania.

Crown also constructed the open-air Narragansett-style excursion cars that were usually provided with the locomotives sold, as well as a set of standard gauge ones for the Greenfield Village's Weiser Railroad.

== Decline ==
A diesel-powered Crown Metal Products locomotive in operation at Valleyfair in 2016

By the 1980s, tighter Federal Railroad Administration regulations for operating steam locomotives, the inherent dangers of boiler failures, as well as the significant amount of work required to keep steam locomotives maintained on a daily basis, resulted in the Crown locomotives falling out of favor, with more parks opting for diesel locomotives or steam-outlines (locomotives powered by diesel or gasoline engines but given the outward appearance of a steam locomotive) for their railways. The most popular steam-outline locomotive is the 2 ft (610 mm) gauge replica of the C.P. Huntington locomotive produced by Chance Rides, which continues to be produced for park railways around the world. Crown Metal Products was shut down in 1989, with all remaining orders fulfilled by 1990.

Ken's son, Bert Williams, continued to support the Crown locomotives, providing replacement parts and service through his company, Castle Ridge Products of Claysville, Pennsylvania, until 2004. That year, the necessary tooling, jigs, inventory and rights were purchased by Tweetsie Railroad in Blowing Rock, North Carolina. Tweetsie Railroad currently handles parts, restoration and service of Crown locomotives.

== List of Crown Metal locomotives ==
A large number of Crown-built locomotives continue to operate at amusement parks, recreational parks, and tourist railways. Below is a partial listing of parks that currently operate, or previously operated, Crown locomotives:

Location	Year installed	Gauge	Notes
Al Zawra’a Dream Park	1990-1991	3 ft (914 mm)	One locomotive, confiscated from Kuwait Entertainment City during Iraq's invasion and occupation of Kuwait between 1990 and 1991.
Assiniboine Park	1964	2 ft (610 mm)	One locomotive built in 1964 for the Assiniboine Park. Currently in operation.
Busch Gardens Tampa	1971	3 ft (914 mm)	Two built for park with South African styling, as well as two additional locomotives acquired from Six Flags St. Louis and Kings Dominion, respectively. The two original locomotives are currently out of service.
Busch Gardens Williamsburg	1975	3 ft (914 mm)	Two built for park, one German styled, the other British styled, along with a third locomotive acquired from Lakeside Amusement Park, of Salem, Virginia.
Canobie Lake Park	Early 1970s	2 ft (610 mm)	One locomotive.
Chippewa Valley Railroad, Eau Claire, Wisconsin	1980s	16 in (406 mm)	First 16-Inch gauge locomotive built by Crown. Originally owned by Little Amerricka. Sold to the CVRR in the 1980s.
City Island Railroad, Harrisburg, Pennsylvania		2 ft (610 mm)	One locomotive named The General.
Doe River Gorge, Hampton, Tennessee		3 ft (914 mm)	One locomotive, with an additional locomotive not built by Crown. Crown locomotive originally built for defunct Pioneer City park, later moved to Carowinds, eventually acquired by Doe River from Huntsville Depot, operational as of August 31, 2021.
Eastern Shore Threshermen & Collectors Assoc. Inc.		2 ft (610 mm)	One locomotive, still powered by coal. Runs on a loop with approx. 3-4 passenger cars. Recently surpassed 60 years on show property. Located in Federalsburg, Maryland.
Fort Fun Abenteuerland		3 ft (914 mm)	One locomotive.
Frontier Town, Ocean City, Maryland	1960	2 ft (610 mm)	Coal fired locomotive built by Crown. Originally owned by Frontier Town. Purchased new in 1960.
Fun Farm Pumpkin Patch		2 ft (610 mm)	Five locomotives with one additional locomotive not built by Crown. Two of the Crown locomotives acquired from Remlinger Farms in Carnation, Washington, one of which originally built for Idlewild Park. Located in Kearney, Missouri.
Gold Coast Railroad Museum		2 ft (610 mm)	One locomotive, used on East Swamp & Gatorville Railroad. Locomotive was donated by Edwin Albert Link. Originally coal-powered, but now runs on compressed air.
Hersheypark	1961	2 ft (610 mm)	Two locomotives named Janelle and Skooter, propane fired.
Kings Island	1971	3 ft (914 mm)	Two locomotives. Operating on the Kings Island & Miami Valley Railroad.
Kirby Family Farm, Williston, Florida		3 ft (914 mm)	Two locomotives, with three additional locomotives not built by Crown. Both Crown locomotives originally built for defunct Six Gun Territory park, and sold to the Historic Jefferson Railway after the park's closure. One of the Crowns was later placed on display at the entrance to the Underground Atlanta attraction in Atlanta, Georgia, while the other continued operation. Kirby Family Farm acquired the first locomotive from Underground Atlanta in 2017, intending to place the locomotive on display until funding is available for restoration to operation, and the second from the Historic Jefferson Railway in late 2019.
Knoebels Amusement Resort	1960	16 in (406 mm)	One locomotive, fired with anthracite coal. 3 additional trains in park (separate attraction) not from Crown Metal Products.
Knott's Berry Farm	1983	2 ft (610 mm)	One locomotive. Formerly operated on the park's Grand Sierra Railroad (now Beagle Express Railroad). Two additional locomotives not built by Crown and a "Galloping Goose" motor railbus operate on the park's 3 ft (914 mm) Ghost Town & Calico Railroad, which is a separate attraction. Crown engine replaced in 2024 with a new steam-outline locomotive and sold to a private owner.
Lagoon	1975	2 ft (610 mm)	Two locomotives operating on the Wild Kingdom Train. One European styled acquired from defunct Busch Gardens Houston park. A third locomotive is on static display.
Mid America Adventure	1971	3 ft (914 mm)	Originally two locomotives, one sold to Busch Gardens Tampa, other continues to operate.
Omaha's Henry Doorly Zoo & Aquarium	1968	2 ft 6 in (762 mm)	One locomotive, with two additional locomotives not built by Crown.
Worlds of Fun	1973	3 ft (914 mm)	Two locomotives, one currently undergoing an overhaul, during which the second is intended to operate. The second locomotive was originally built for Kings Dominion in Doswell, Virginia, acquired by WOF from the former Dry Gulch, U.S.A. park in Adair, Oklahoma.

== See also ==
- List of locomotive builders
