= Viewliner Train of Tomorrow =

Former Disneyland attraction

- The Viewliner at the Fantasyland Depot in 1957

Disneyland
- Status: Removed
- Opening date: June 10, 1957
- Closing date: September 30, 1958
- Replaced by: Disneyland Alweg Monorail System

Ride statistics
- Attraction type: Rail transportation system
- Designer: WED Enterprises
- Riders per row: 2
- Track gauge: 2 ft 6 in (762 mm)

The Viewliner Train of Tomorrow was a 2 ft 6 in (762 mm) narrow-gauge, miniature train that once operated alongside portions of the Disneyland Railroad main line.

The attraction commenced operation on June 10, 1957, and was billed by Disneyland as "the fastest miniature train in the world." Two separate trains, designed by Disney Imagineer Bob Gurr and built as scale replicas of General Motors' futuristic Aerotrain, traveled along a dog-bone track circuit (rail line with a turnaround loop at each end) through parts of Tomorrowland and Fantasyland. The Tomorrowland train featured cars that were named for the planets, while the cars of the Fantasyland train were named after various Disney characters.

The modern, streamlined trains were placed into service to represent the future of rail travel, in contrast to the steam-powered Disneyland Railroad, which represented its past. Motive power for each train consisted of an integral head-end unit driven by an Oldsmobile "Rocket" V8 gasoline engine, mated to a Jeep transfer case powering drive-shafts to both the front and rear wheel trucks. Two 1954 Oldsmobile 88 2-door coupes furnished the windscreen, doors and instrument console for each of the two 5,000-pound (2,270 kg) locomotives. The attraction operated until September 30, 1958, when construction began on the Matterhorn and Submarine Voyage. The Disneyland Alweg Monorail System ultimately took the place of the Viewliner in June 1959, thereby making it one of the shortest-lived rides in the park's history. The railroad ties from the attraction were later used to build the Deer Lake Park & Julian Railroad, a 3 ft (914 mm) narrow-gauge backyard railroad owned by Disney animator Ollie Johnston at his vacation home near Julian, California.

== See also ==
- List of former Disneyland attractions
- Rail transport in Walt Disney Parks and Resorts
