= List of Hawaii railroads =

== Passenger railroads ==
- Skyline

== Heritage and Scenic Railroads ==
- Hawaiian Railway Society
- Kauai Plantation Railway

== Defunct railroads ==
- Ahukini Terminal and Railway Company
- Hawaii Railway
- Hawaii Consolidated Railway
- Hawaiian Railroad
- Hilo Railroad
- Kahului Railroad
- Kauai Railway
- Koolau Railway
- Lahaina, Kaanapali and Pacific Railroad
- Oahu Railway and Land Company
- West Hawaii Railway

=== Electric ===
- Honolulu Rapid Transit and Land Company

=== Industrial Rail Operations ===
==== Island of Hawaiʻi ====
- Hamakua Mill Company
- Kukaiau Plantation Company
- Hawaiian Agricultural Company
- Honokaa Sugar Company
- Pacific Sugar Mill Company
- Hutchinson Sugar Plantation Company
- Kaiwiki Sugar Company, Ltd
- Kohala Sugar Company
- Kona Sugar Company
- Olaa Sugar Company
- Ookala Sugar Company
- Puna Sugar Company
- Hawaiian Mahogany Lumber Company
- Laupahohoe Sugar Company
- Paauhau Sugar Plantation Company
- Puako Plantation
- Waiakea Mill Company

==== Island of Kauaʻi ====
- Grove Farm Company
- Hawaiian Sugar Company
- Kekaha Sugar Company
- Kilauea Sugar Plantation Company
- Koloa Sugar Company
- The Lihue Plantation Company
- Hanamauku Sugar Plantation
- Ahukini Terminal and Railway Company (absorbed by the Lihue Plantation)
- McBryde Sugar Company
- Eleele Plantation
- Kauai Railway Company (McBryde Sugar Company sponsored)
- Waimea Sugar Mill Company

==== Island of Lānaʻi ====
- Maunalei Sugar Company

==== Island of Maui ====
- Hawaiian Commercial & Sugar Company
- Kihei Plantation Company
- Maui Agricultural Company
- Paia Plantation
- Kaeleku Sugar Company
- Hana Plantation Company
- Haiku Sugar Company
- Kipahulu Sugar Company
- Kaeleku Sugar Company
- Pioneer Mill Company
- Olowalu Sugar Company
- Wailuku Sugar Company

==== Island of Molokaʻi ====
- American Sugar Company

==== Island of Oʻahu ====
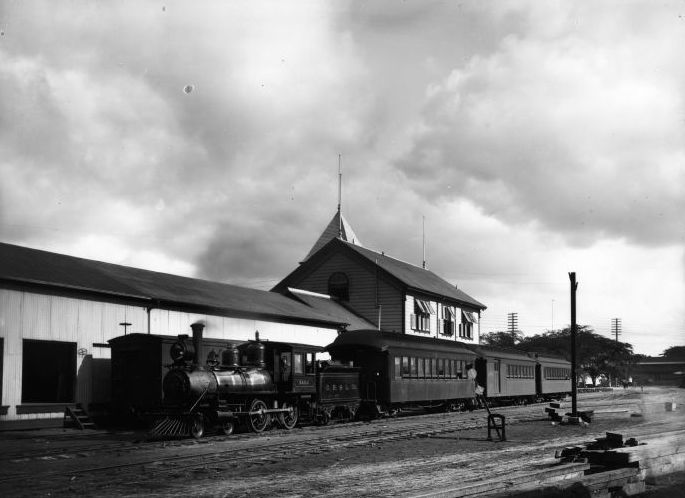
Railroad Depot on Oahu, c. 1900

- Beretania Street Railroad
- Ewa Plantation Company
- Heeia Agricultural Company
- Kahuku Plantation Company
- Koolau Railway Company (bought out by Kahuku Plantation Company)
- Hibiscus & Heliconia Short Line Railroad
- Libby, McNeill & Libby
- Oahu Sugar Company
- Honolulu Plantation Company
- Waiahole Water Company
- Waialua Agricultural Company
- Waianae Sugar Company
- Waimanalo Sugar Company
