= Kauai Plantation Railway =

Heritage railroad in Hawaii, U.S.

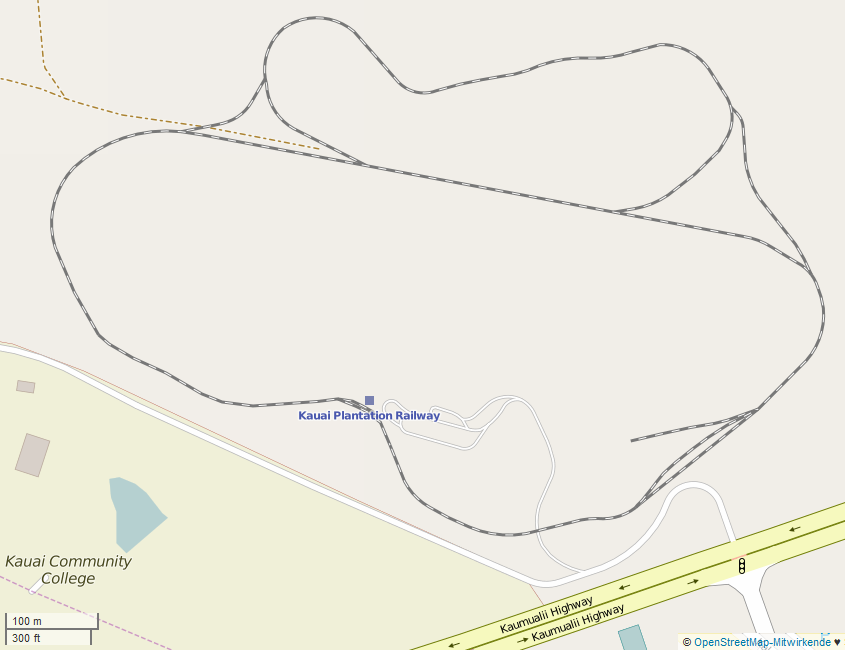
- A map of the railroad

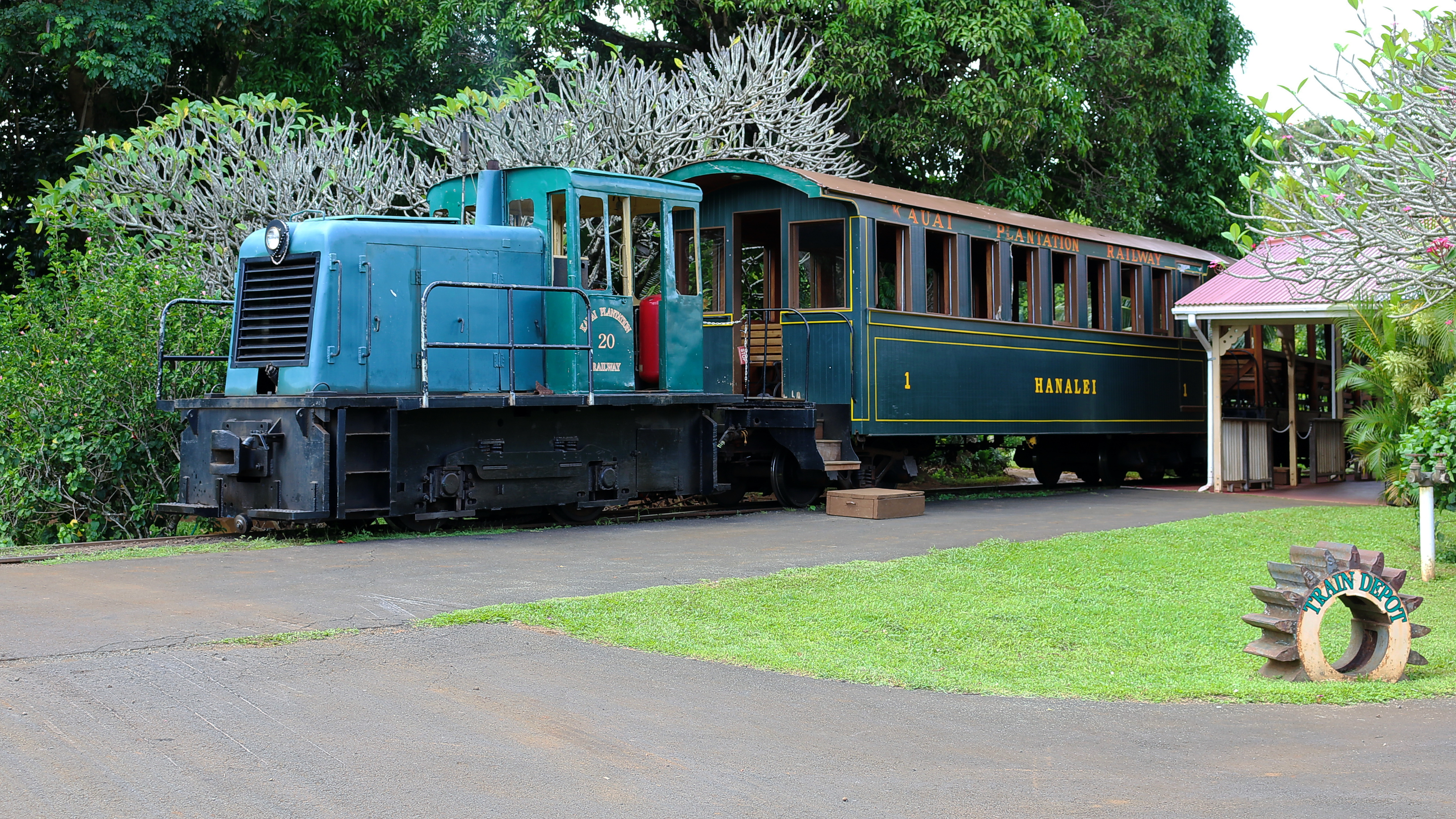
- A train on the railway in 2015

Overview
- Dates of operation: 2007–present

Technical
- Track gauge: 3 ft (914 mm)
- Length: 2.5 miles (4 km)

Other
- Website: www.kilohanakauai.com/plantation-train

The Kauai Plantation Railway is a heritage railroad on the island of Kauaʻi in Hawaii. Built in 2006 and opened in January 2007, the railroad operates on a 2.5-mile (4 km) long track within the Kilohana Plantation and offers passenger rides around the plantation, pulled by a 1940s diesel locomotive. It was the first new railroad to be built on the Hawaiian islands in 100 years.

The railway was designed and built as part of a larger project to bring tourists to the Kilohana Plantation, and the train travels through a variety of agricultural areas intended to showcase the variety of agriculture in Hawaii. Initial plans called for two antique steam locomotives from Oʻahu to pull trains, but due to the significant cost of restoration, vintage diesel locomotives bought from the Philippines are used instead.

== History ==
=== Previous railroads on Kauaʻi ===
The first railroad on Kauaʻi opened in 1881. Plantations on the island soon developed a network of 2 ft 6 in (762 mm) gauge railways which transported harvested sugarcane for processing and export. The last of these was replaced by truck transport in 1959.

=== Formation and construction ===
The Kilohana Plantation is centered on a mansion originally built for Hawaiian business magnate Gaylord Wilcox in 1935. The property was taken over by Fred Atkins in 1986, establishing a restaurant and making the mansion available for events. This business model was a success until Hurricane Iniki struck the island in 1992. The plantation was shut down for a year, and business did not return at similar levels when it reopened. Atkins decided to change his business model in 2003, adding significant and varied agriculture within the plantation's land to demonstrate the techniques of smaller farmers.

As part of the change in business model, Atkins and the other owners of the Kilohana Plantation announced plans to construct a new 2.5-mile (4 km) long heritage railroad in January 2004, initially planning to use steam locomotives which formerly operated on Oahu. The island's planning commission approved the project in March 2004. Per a report in the Honolulu Star-Bulletin, at the start of construction, "Nobody in the crew knew how to build a train track", but this was solved by visits from a consultant from the U.S. mainland who advised on construction techniques. Following the installation of 7,920 ties, 1,056 rails, and 31,680 spikes, over eight months in 2006, it opened to the public in January 2007. The planned steam locomotives were acquired from their location in the Philippines and brought to California, but lacking the $300,000 per locomotive in restoration costs, train operations began with two small diesel locomotives, including a 1939-built Geo D. Whitcomb Company switcher, and a 1948-built GE 25-ton switcher.

The Kauai Plantation Railway was "Hawaii's first new railroad to be built in 100 years". While intended as a tourist attraction, by July 2007, Atkins reported that approximately 40 percent of riders were instead Hawaiian residents, which came as a welcome surprise to the railway.

== Operations and equipment ==
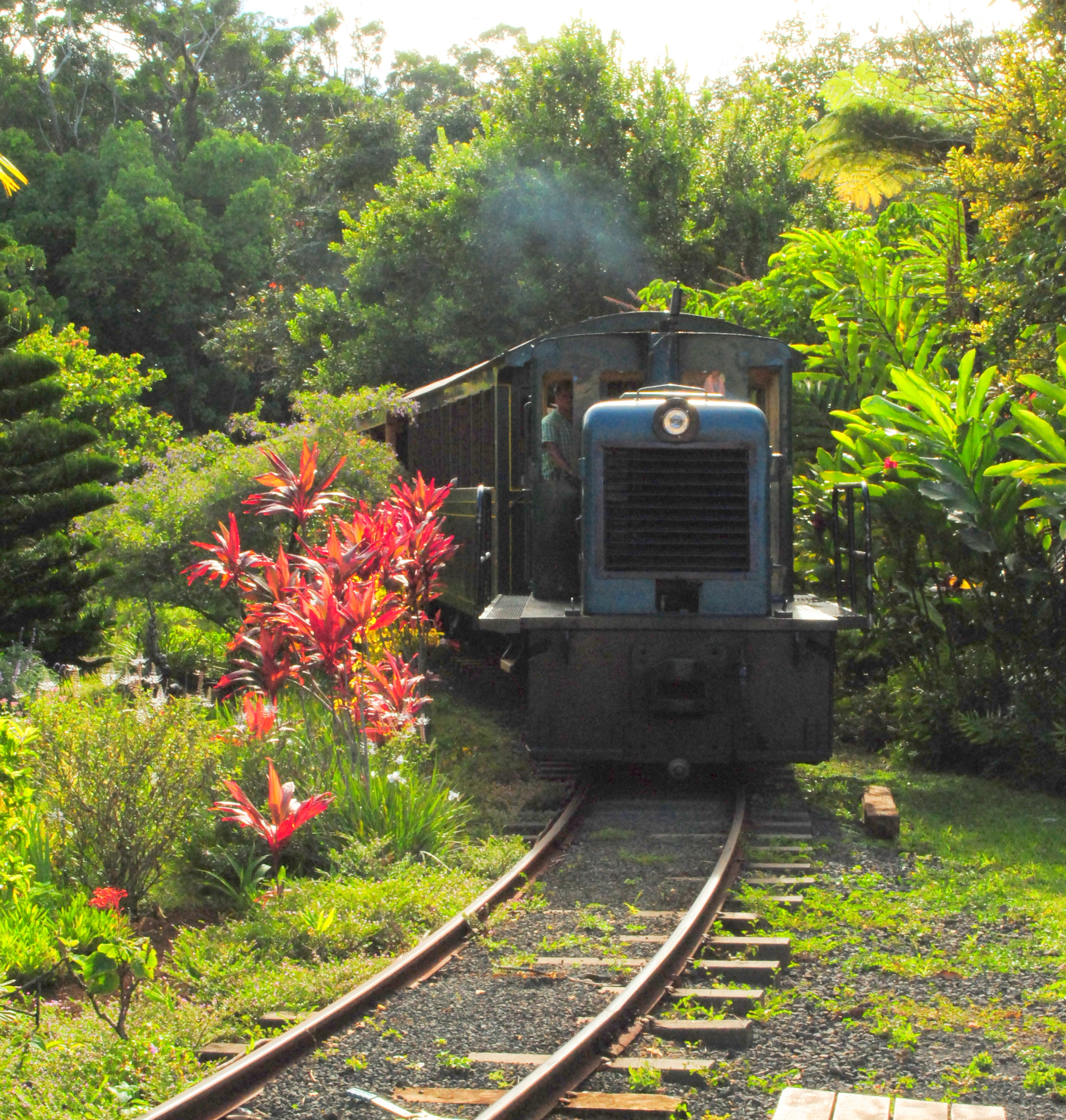
The train in operation

The Kauai Plantation Railway offers several train rides around the plantation. The trains pass through a variety of fields and orchards that grow fruit for the plantation, along with animals such as pigs, goats, and donkeys. In addition to a basic train ride, the railroad also offers an "adventure tour", where the train stops and passengers disembark to feed animals and visit a nearby valley.

Trains are primarily pulled by the railroad's 25-ton switcher, and passengers ride in four passenger cars, each with a capacity of 36. The cars are named after Hawaiian rivers, and were ordered from the Philippines to a similar design as that of passenger cars once used by King Kalākaua of Hawaiʻi.

The railway has both enclosed passenger cars and a car with open sides. The passenger cars sit on six 35-foot (11 m) flatcars originally built in 1941 at Pearl Harbor by the U.S. Navy, which were then used by the Oahu Railway and Land Company and afterwards sold to White Pass and Yukon Route in Alaska.

== See also ==
- Heritage railways in Kauaʻi
- Grove Farm (Lihue, Hawaii)
- Hawaiian Railway Society
