= Railroads of Hawaii =

Railroads of Hawaii may refer to:

- Railroads of Hawaii, Inc. doing business as Lahaina, Kaanapali and Pacific Railroad
- List of Hawaii railroads
