= S. C. Allen =

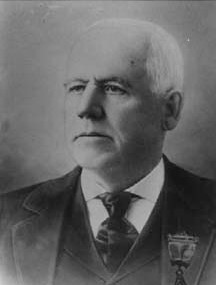
S. C. Allen

Samuel Clesson Allen (May 17, 1831 – May 13, 1903), known professionally as S. C. Allen, was a wealthy businessman in the Kingdom of Hawaii and the Territory of Hawaii. He was the namesake and nephew of Massachusetts politician Samuel Clesson Allen and a cousin to Hawaiian diplomat Elisha Hunt Allen. The bark S. C. Allen, and Port Allen on Kauai were named in his honor.

== Background ==
He was born in New Salem, Massachusetts and raised in Bangor, Maine, the son of Frederick H. Allen. After receiving his basic education, he was briefly employed by Wilkinson, Stetson & Co. in Boston. The Allen family had a record of government service in both the United States and the Kingdom of Hawaii. His cousin Elisha Hunt Allen (1804–1883) was United States Minister to the Kingdom of Hawaii at the time S. C. relocated to the islands in 1850. He was the namesake of Minister Allen's father, US Congressman Samuel Clesson Allen (1772–1842). Elisha's son William Fessenden Allen (1831–1906) would serve on the staffs of Kamehameha V, Lunalilo and Kalākaua, as well as on the Advisory Council of the Provisional Government of Hawaii and the Executive Council of the Republic of Hawaii.

On May 31, 1858, Allen received from Kamehameha IV a commission to take possession of unclaimed Pacific islands for the Hawaiian Kingdom. The first claim was on Johnston Atoll on June 14, which Allen named Kalama after his ship. The atoll had been claimed under the U.S. Guano Islands Act the previous December, leading to disputes over the island's ownership.

== Business ==
There was probably no industry of the Territory that he was not connected with in some way. He was essentially a merchant and trader with keen insight and almost unerring judgement. Mr. Allen neither sought nor cared for official honors.

— The Hawaiian Star

After arriving in Hawaii, he used the name S. C. Allen professionally, and entered into a mercantile partnership with William A. Aldrich and John Smith Walker. In 1875, he and his brother-in-law Mark P. Robinson formed the Allen & Robinson Lumber Company and engaged in the operation of inter-island sailing ships.

Allen's business enterprises extended to the sugar industry in Hawaii. He was one of the directors of C. Brewer & Co., which commissioned the New England Shipbuilding Corporation of Bath, Maine to build the bark (sailing ship) S. C. Allen. The ship was launched May 8, 1888, and sailed from Boston on June 27. After a sea route that passed Melbourne, Australia, the ship arrived in Honolulu on January 5, 1889. It was partially gutted in 1913 in Honolulu Harbor, by a fire believed to have been caused by a carelessly tossed lit cigarette. The ship was eventually rebuilt.

== Death and estate ==
In his later years, he lost his vision and was dependent on family members for his mobility. When S. C. died in 1903, he left an estate valued at $2,454,464.59 (Hawaiian dollars). The bulk of it was left in trust to wife Bathsheba, Mark P. Robinson, Joseph O. Carter (confidant and legal advisor to Liliʻuokalani) and Paul Muhlendorf (VP of Allen & Robinson) and their heirs. His wife had unrestricted access to the use of the estate's assets. The individual bequests made in the will included immediate family and distant relatives, close friends and employees, and public institutions.

S. C. and Bathsheba had no natural children of their own, but on November 12, 1877, they formally adopted George C. Allen (1868–1925), a.k.a. George F. Allen, a.k.a. George Clesson Fyfe Allen. In his will, S. C. nullified the adoption, leaving him $1 and disinheriting him from any claim to the estate. Citing George as having been in non-adherence to the signed Articles of Adoption, George was asked to sign a legal document relinquishing his rights to the estate.

Port Allen on Kauai was originally named ʻEleʻele Landing. In 1909, terminal owner Kauai Railway renamed it for Allen.

== Extended family ==
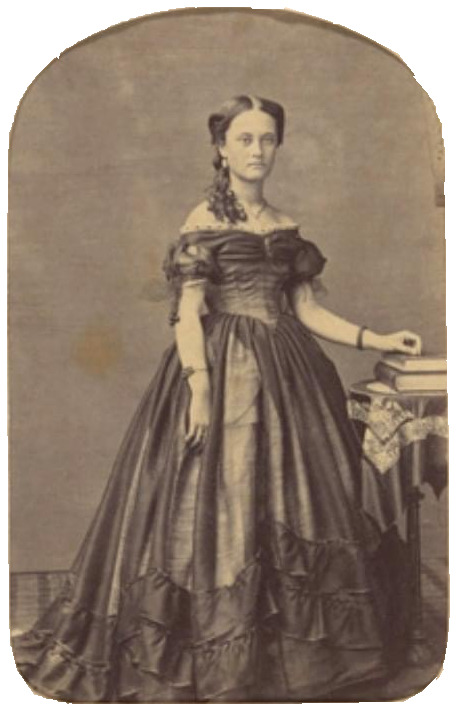
Bathsheba Maria Kulamanu Robinson Allen, ca. 1860s

The first Allen to become related to Hawaiian royalty through marriage, albeit indirectly, was William Fessenden Allen who wed Cordelia Church Bishop (1837–1912), a cousin of Charles Reed Bishop, in 1865. Bishop was married to Bernice Pauahi Pākī, of the royal House of Kamehameha.

In 1865, S. C. Allen married Bathsheba Maria Kulamanu Robinson (1849–1914), daughter of John James Robinson (1799–1876) and Rebecca Prever (1817– 1882), a descendant of Hawaiian chiefess Kamakana. The marriage merged two families who would influence Hawaiii's politics, ecology, and business economy for decades. Among his Robinson in-laws were:

- Mark P. Robinson (1852–1915) served in the House of Nobles of the Legislature of the Kingdom of Hawaii, and Minister of Foreign Affairs during the reign of Liliʻuokalani. He was a member of the Committee of Safety that drafted the Bayonet Constitution of 1887 which codified the legislature as the supreme authority over any actions by the monarchy. He twice helped financially bail out the Hawaiian government. M.P.'s son James Lawrence Prever was a founder of the Hawaiian Broadcasting System.
- Mary Robinson (1844–1930) was a philanthropist. Her husband Thomas R. Foster (1835–1889), along with his brother William, George Norton Wilcox, William B. Godfrey, and John Ena, created the Inter-Island Steam Navigation Company in 1883. The service transported passengers and cargo between the islands until 1947. The site of Foster Botanical Garden had been their homestead, bequeathed to the city of Honolulu upon her death.
- Victoria Robinson (1846–1935) wed Curtis Perry Ward (1826–1882), who had ties to Liliʻuokalani and Hawaii's royal court. The couple had seven daughters, including Victoria Kathleen Ward (1878–1958) who is mentioned in S. C.'s will as his adopted daughter "Victoria Kathleen Ward Allen". This might have been the informal Hawaiian hānai tradition of adoption, since her 1958 obituary made no mention of S. C. Allen, and her legal name remained "Victoria Kathleen Ward". The site of the Ward family coconut plantation home is now the Neal S. Blaisdell Center.
- Annie Robinson (1855–1921) wed Albert Jaeger (1845–1900), a German immigrant who was appointed Hawaii's commissioner of the Bureau of Forestry. He became a manager at Allen & Robinson Lumber Company. His uncle Hermann A. Widemann was Minister of Finance under Liliʻuokalani. Together, Jaeger and Widemann ran an amateur planting operation on Kauai. A biology hobbyist, Jaeger planted numerous trees on Mount Tantalus, and amassed a large collection of rare plants. Upon his death, the government was given the collection to re-plant on public lands.

== Bibliography ==
- Joesting, Edward (1990). Kauai: The Separate Kingdom. University of Hawaii Press. ISBN 978-0-8248-1162-4. OCLC 154200817.
- Krout, Mary H.; Bishop, Bernice Pauahi (1908). The memoirs of Hon. Bernice Pauahi Bishop. The Knickerbocker press. OCLC 4683252 – via HathiTrust.
