= Mark P. Robinson =

Hawaiian politician (1852–1915)

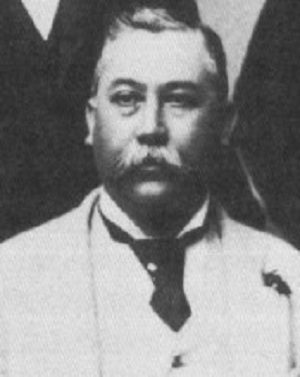

Kingdom of Hawaii Minister of Foreign Affairs
- In office November 8, 1892 – January 12, 1893
- Monarch: Liliʻuokalani
- Preceded by: Joseph Nāwahī
- Succeeded by: Samuel Parker

House of Nobles
- In office 1892–1892

House of Nobles
- In office 1887–1888
- Monarch: Kalākaua

Personal details
- Born: Mark Prever Robinson; July 4, 1852 Honolulu
- Died: April 2, 1915 (aged 62) Honolulu
- Spouse: Sophia Louisa Campbell
- Parents: John James Robinson (father); Rebecca Prever (mother)
- Occupation: Financier, business magnate, politician

Mark Prever Robinson (July 4, 1852 – April 2, 1915) was a Hawaiian business magnate and politician. He served as Minister of Foreign Affairs of the Kingdom of Hawaii under the reign of Liliuokalani. During times of political upheaval and financial stress of Hawaii's changing governments, Robinson joined with other business men to come to the financial aid of the government.

== Early life ==
Known professionally as M. P. Robinson, he was born July 4, 1852, in the Kingdom of Hawaii. He was the eldest son, and fifth of nine children, born to British immigrant John James Robinson (1799–1876) and Rebecca Prever (1817– 1882), a descendant of Hawaiian chiefess Kamakana.

== Business interests ==
In 1875, Robinson and his brother-in-law S. C. (Samuel Clesson) Allen of Kauai formed the Allen & Robinson Lumber Company and became engaged in the operation of inter-island sailing ships. With other partners he formed Marshall, Campbell & Robinson, which operated a fleet of inter-island side-wheel paddle steamers. Robinson was an investor in Hawaii sugar plantations, and helped found the First National Bank. He partnered with Benjamin Franklin Dillingham, S. C. Allen, James Bicknell Castle, Robert Lewers and John H. Paty in 1889 to establish the Oahu Railway and Land Company. Robinson was the rail company's first treasurer, and one of its steady customers in shipping produce from his banana plantation to buyers.

During the 1900 Bubonic Plague epidemic, much of Honolulu's Chinatown was destroyed by fires that were ignited by the Territory of Hawaii Board of Health in an attempt to eradicate the source of the plague. The immediate resulting damage claims overwhelmed the territorial government's ability to reimburse property owners. Pending funding from the United States government, Robinson was one of several business owners who advanced money to the territorial government for claims settlements.

== Politics ==
Robinson was a member of the House of Nobles of the Legislature of the Kingdom of Hawaii for the Special Session of November 3, 1887 – May 28, 1888, Special Session of May 29 – September 11, 1888, and the 1892 Legislative Session of the Kingdom of Hawaii.

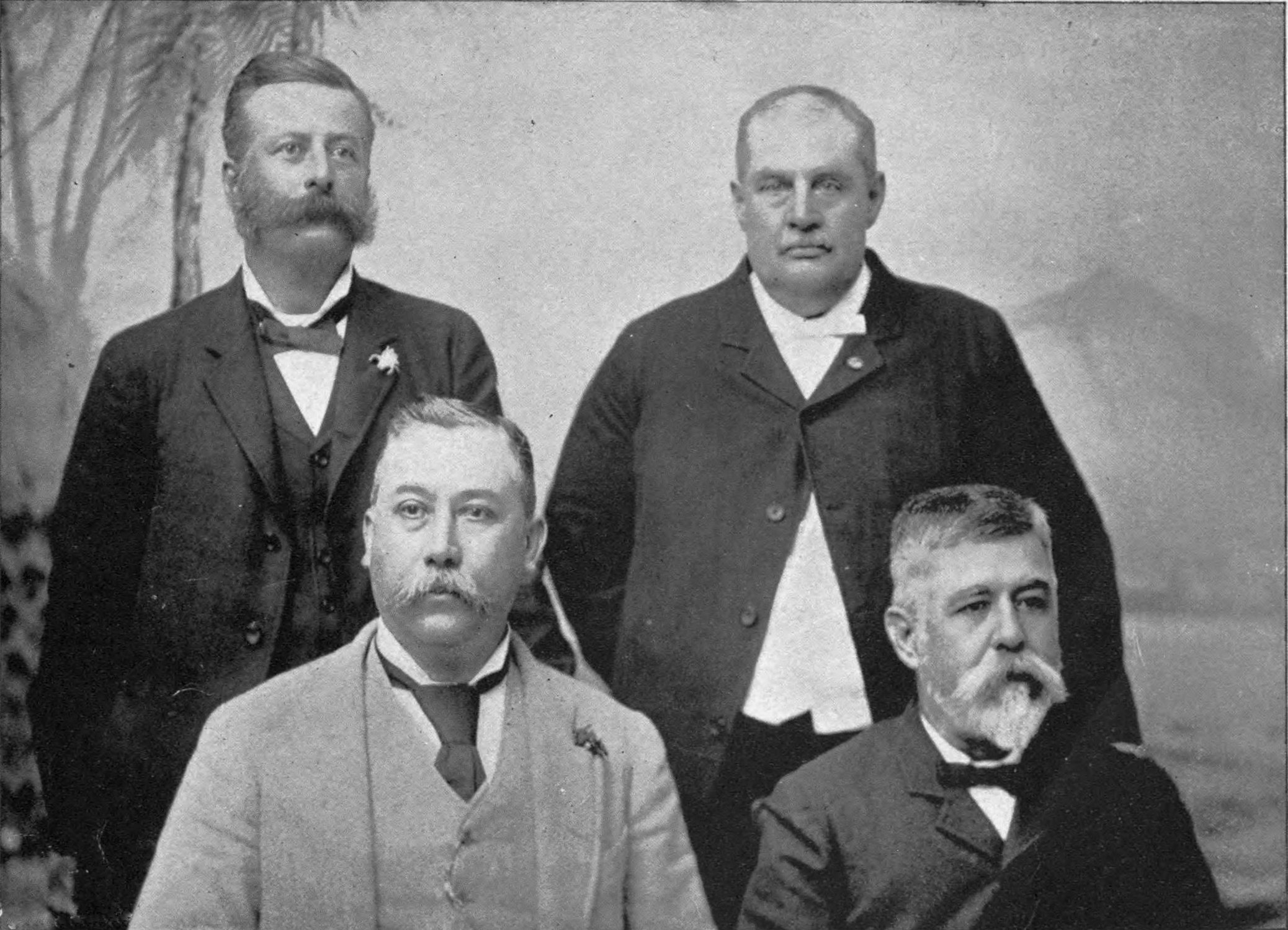
The Wilcox Cabinet, November, 1892. Brown is bottom left

Although a supporter of the monarchy, Robinson took exception with the Walter M. Gibson cabinet expenditures and schemes during the reign of King Kalākaua. He became a member of the Committee of Safety that drafted the Bayonet Constitution of 1887 which codified the legislature as the supreme authority over any actions by the monarchy. During the reign of Queen Liliʻuokalani, he served as Minister of Foreign Affairs from November 8, 1892, to January 12, 1893, under the George Norton Wilcox cabinet which had political inclination toward the Reform Party. This cabinet was ousted by the legislature and he was replaced by the queen with Samuel Parker, shortly before the 1893 overthrow of the Kingdom of Hawaii on January 17.

Claus Spreckels, who had close ties with the monarchy, loaned $95,000 to the Provisional Government of Hawaii. Robinson joined with other business men to finance a repayment of the loan, to prevent Spreckels from having leverage in any counter revolution to restore the monarchy. Robinson served on the Republic of Hawaii Council of State under President Sanford B. Dole.

== Family and death ==
Rebecca Prever was the second wife of John James Robinson. With his first wife, he had children both his own and one step-daughter. Below are the nine children born to Rebecca Prever and John James Robinson:

- Robert (1853–1854)
- John Lawrence Newcomb (1861–1890), wed chiefess Caroline Kapu-ai-ana-hulu Johnson (1854–1937) of Kona.
- Mary (1844–1930) wed Thomas R. Foster – Foster Botanical Garden was their homestead, bequeathed to the city of Honolulu upon her death.
- Victoria (1846–1935) wed Kentucky-born Curtis Perry Ward, who had ties to Liliʻuokalani and Hawaii's royal court. The couple bought a coconut plantation and built a 2-story home they named "Old Plantation". Following Ward's 1882 death, Victoria oversaw the plantation operations for the next half century. Composer David Nape and Ward family friend Mary Jane Montano wrote the tribute song "Old Plantation". The first known recording was by Peter Kalani in 1916, but it has since been recorded by numerous artists.
- Bathsheba (1849–1914) wed Samuel Clesson (S. C.) Allen from Boston. Known as "Aunt Batty" to her nieces and nephews, she inherited the bulk of Allen's $2,000,000 estate after his 1903 death. In widowhood, she became a philanthropist. Upon her own death in 1914, her estate was estimated at slightly under $1,000,000.
- Matilda A. (1851–1937) wed William E. Foster, the nephew of her sister Mary's husband Thomas R. Foster.
- Annie (1855–1921) wed Albert Jaeger, a German immigrant who was appointed Hawaii's commissioner of the Bureau of Forestry. He became a manager at Allen & Robinson Lumber Company.
- Lucy (1858–1943) wed Dr. Albert McWayne
- M. P. Robinson wed Sophia Louisa Campbell (1851–1888) of New Jersey in 1877. After her death at age 36, he never remarried. They were the parents of three sons:

- James Lawrence Prever (1880–1947) was trustee of his father's estate, and a founder of the Hawaiian Broadcasting System. He wed Lilla May Ripley (1879–1969). The couple had no children.

- Mark Alexander (1882–1955) managed the Robinson estate. With his first wife Agnes Armour (1887–1942), he had four sons and two daughters: Mark Prever II, James Allen, Charles Armour, John Alexander, Susanna Louise and Kaikilani Kamakana. In 1945, he wed Mary Kapuahualani Hart (1896–1978). He had no children with her. She was subsequently elected to the Hawaii Territorial Senate, and founded Robinson Travel, Inc.

- Allen Campbell (1885–1926) was employed in managerial positions at Trent Trust Co., and C. Brewer & Co., and was the founder of Bergstrom Music Company. During World War I, he served as an American Red Cross Captain in England and Russia. He never married.

After a lengthy period of insomnia that drove him to the brink of insanity, Robinson killed himself on April 2, 1915. He left a note for his son explaining his actions. At the time of his death, he belonged to several fraternal organizations, including the Freemasons, Scottish Rites and the Knights Templar. His estate was estimated at $419,720.23 (equivalent to $13,357,872 in 2025), mostly land and other investments. A Canadian broker had been in negotiations in 1910 to put Robinson's private library on the auction block. At the time, it was said to be one of the most extensive libraries in a private collection. The deal was never completed, and the library was estimated at $57,000 at the time of his death.

The following are the children of John James Robinson and his first wife. They are a half-brother and two half-sisters to Mark P. Robinson:

- Caroline Tauwati Robinson (1815–1921) of Tahitian-Hawaiian ancestry, she was the step-daughter of John James Robinson, from his first wife's previous marriage. Known as "Wati" or "Watti", she married Robert William Holt, her step-father's business manager, and related through marriage to Liliʻuokalani's husband John Owen Dominis.
- James J. Robinson (1826–1896) lived at north Kona. His wife's name was Kekapa.
- Charlotte Robinson (1834–1913) married Richard Coady at Washington Place in 1852. After his death, she married Dr. Eugene Von Hasslocher in 1863 and lived in Karlsruhe for a period of time while her husband served as the Hawaiian Consul to the Grand Duchy of Baden. She accompanied Queen Emma for the latter parts of her visits to Italy, Germany, France and England in 1866 before the queen departed for the United States.

== Bibliography ==
- Korn, Alfons L. (1958). The Victorian visitors: an account of the Hawaiian Kingdom, 1861-1866, including the journal letters of Sophia Cracroft; extracts from the journals of Lady Franklin, and diaries and letters of Queen Emma of Hawaii (1st ed.). Honolulu: University of Hawaii Press. ISBN 0-87022-421-2. OCLC 8989368.
- Lydecker, Robert C. (1918). Roster legislatures of Hawaii, 1841–1918.: Constitutions of monarchy and republic, speeches of sovereign and President. Hawaiian Gazette Co. – via HathiTrust.
- Kuykendall, Ralph Simpson (1967). The Hawaiian Kingdom 1874–1893, The Kalakaua Dynasty. Vol. 3. Honolulu: University of Hawaii Press. ISBN 978-0-87022-433-1. OCLC 500374815.
