= Heritage railways in Kauaʻi =

There are two heritage railways in Kauaʻi, the birthplace of Hawaiian railroading. It was added to the National Register of Historic Places on January 19, 1979.

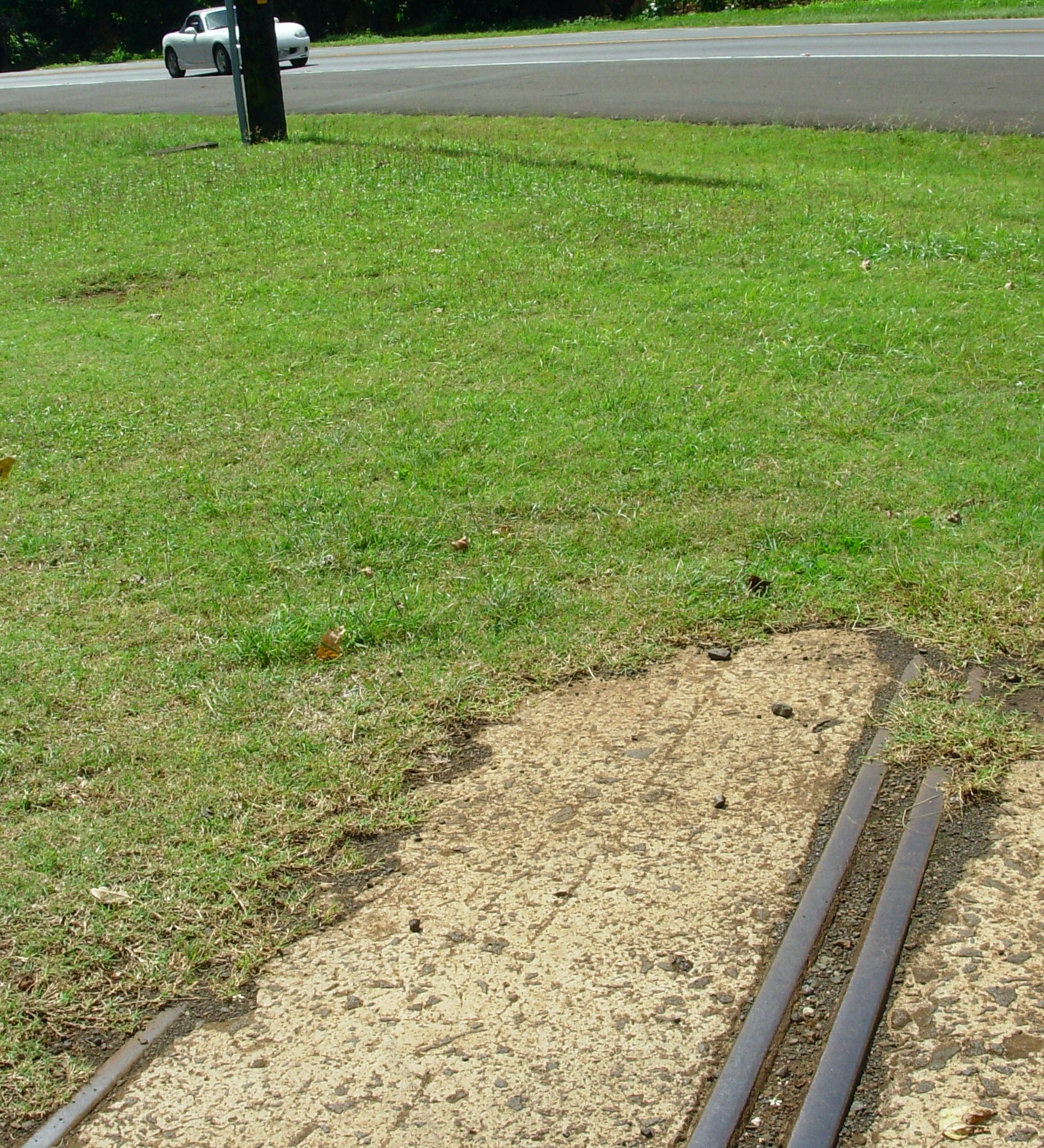
Narrow gauge rail tracks, Kauaʻi

The Grove Farm Sugar Plantation Museum preserved original steam locomotives from the earliest days of rail transport in Kauaʻi, restoring the small-gauge engines without much notice beyond the local community. The museum acquired property where historic right-of-ways had run, and found, in the thick vegetation, track beds ready for restoration, allowing the Museum to display their authentic, working locomotives.

The second heritage railway in Kauaʻi is the Kauaʻi Plantation Railway at Kilohana. Unlike the Grove Farm Museum trains, which are brought out only once a month, the Kauaʻi Plantation Railway is a daily fee-based attraction.

== Context of Kauaʻi's railroading origins ==
Sugarcane plantations in Hawaii led to the introduction of railways to Hawaii. Rail transport in Hawaii began in the late 19th century when small-gauge locomotives were brought in to replace oxen or horses to haul harvested sugarcane from the fields to mills, and then to transport the raw sugar to docks for shipment to refineries in California.

Hawaii's first commercial sugar plantation was created in Koloa, Kauaʻi in 1835, and sugar rapidly grew to dominate Kauaʻi's economy—and the economy of the Hawaiian archipelago—through the 19th and 20th centuries; railways were but one of several innovations introduced to Kauaʻi to increase efficiency and capitalize on available resources during the 19th century. For example, steam plows were used by around the middle of the century, and abundant electricity was generated from mountain streams both to power mills and illuminate the fields for 24-hour shifts as early as 1885. Kauaʻi's early leadership in rail transport in Hawaii is consistent with this tradition of innovation.

=== Hawaii's first railways ===
Railways were under construction in both Kauaʻi and on Hawaiʻi island at about the same time in 1881.

==== Kauaʻi's first railway ====
In Kauaʻi, the Kīlauea Sugar Plantation purchased a steam locomotive from Germany and created 2 ft 6 in (762 mm) narrow gauge tracks through the sugarcane fields. The first spike in this track was driven by Princess Liliʻuokalani, then Regent and soon to assume the throne as last Queen of the Kingdom of Hawaii. She had arrived the day before, disembarking at Hanalei, a nearby port, and was invited to the September 24 ceremonial opening at the site of what is now the town of Kīlauea. The assembled dignitaries included Governor Paul P. Kanoe and the Plantation Manager, Robert A. Macfie, Jr. This is often credited as Hawaii's first railway.

While field railways ran on “literally little more than panels of snap-track laid and re-laid across the fields as the seasonal cutting progressed,” more permanent right-of-ways were soon established to provide freight and passenger service from mills to ports, where raw sugar was packed aboard ocean-going ships bound for California refineries. An engineer, sent to Kauaʻi from Honolulu in 1898, took the train from Waimea, on the coast, to the Kīlauea Plantation's Kekaha mill, situated in the midst of the cane fields, and he described the trip:

The railroad is a cute affair, only 30 inch gauge—cars mostly flat for hauling cane and sugar in bags….All cars are no more than 4 feet wide….Engines… are regular toys—they weigh about eight tons….[We] bowled over the four miles of toy railroad to the headquarters of the Plantation….They have engineer only—no fireman—no breakman. No breaks on cars.

==== First railway on the Big Island ====
On Hawaiʻi island (known as the Big Island), a larger railway was also under construction, with the first tracks being laid in March 1881 in Māhukona, North Kohala; its official charter of Incorporation under the name of The Hawaiian Railroad Company was granted in July 1880. The Hawaiian Gazette reported that twelve miles (19 km) of track had been laid in September 1881, but its unofficial opening was in March 1882. The New York Times, however, reported that the first steam railway was to be built on the Big Island in 1899, which may be a misunderstanding based on financial reorganization of the existing railways.

==== Initial railways in Oahu and Maui ====
The Hawaiian Gazette, in the same 1882 issue that it mentions the initial freight hauling by steam on the Big Island, also states that on Maui, the “Kahului railroad has met all the requirements for transporting freight.”

Although one source claims that Oahu did not enter the railway age until 1889, it appears that Oahu had a field railway using the engine Olomana in 1883.

== Grove Farm Plantation ==
- Grove Farm Company Locomotives
- U.S. National Register of Historic Places
- Location within Hawaii
- Location: Hawaii Route 50, Puhi, Hawaii
- Coordinates: 21°58′6″N 159°23′50″W
- Built: 1887
- Architect: Hohenzollern Locomotive Works; Baldwin Locomotive Works
- NRHP reference No.: 79000761
- Added to NRHP: January 19, 1979

The preservation of steam locomotives on Kauaʻi is largely due to the Grove Farm Sugar Plantation Museum, led by Mabel and Elsie Wilcox, nieces of George Norton Wilcox, who bought Grove Farm Plantation in 1864.

The sisters fought to preserve the trains when the Koloa Plantation was taken over by Grove Farm Plantation in 1947 and later when the trains were taken out of service in the late 1950s. About 1970, the trains were almost sold to the Disney Company for $500 each, when Mabel Wilcox matched the price and kept the locomotives in Kauaʻi. When Mabel Wilcox turned the Plantation she had inherited into the Grove Farm Museum in the 1970s, the four 2 ft 6 in (762 mm) gauge locomotives were given to the museum. When she died in 1978, her estate included an endowment for the operations of the Museum, including the locomotives. They are currently listed in the National Register of Historic Places as Grove Farm Company Locomotives. The collection includes four locomotives, all of which saw extensive service on Kauaʻi.

=== Paulo ===
Pride of place in the Grove Farm Museum locomotive collection is one of the earliest steam locomotives in Kauaʻi, an 1887 Hohenzollern steam engine built in Düsseldorf, Germany for the Koloa Plantation for $4,000, which arrived in 1888. This engine is also notable because it is today the oldest steam locomotive in the state of Hawaii currently being run on rails; it pre-dates all steam locomotives in the State, in any condition, except for two: one is a 2 ft (610 mm) gauge Baldwin Locomotive from 1883 that is said to be buried in a sand dune in Puunene, on the island of Maui; the other is the Claus Spreckels, dating from 1882, originally a coal-fired engine later converted to oil, which is in storage in Maui in operational condition.

At one time, it was thought the first locomotive on Kauaʻi was this 1887 engine. It is a wood-fired side-tank locomotive weighing some 10 tons and has a 2 ft 6 in (762 mm) gauge. This engine is named Paulo, a tribute to Paul Isenberg, a wealthy sugar planter in the 1880s. Paul Isenberg spent many years in Kauaʻi, arriving in 1858 and by 1862, at age 25, was manager of the Lihue Plantation, the second oldest plantation after Koloa. He greatly expanded the plantation and also was a partner in the Koloa sugar mill and the Kekaha sugar mill. He returned to his native Germany in 1878, leaving his brother Carl to assume his responsibilities at Lihue Plantation. Paul remained active in the business, however, and arranged for the immigration of 124 people from Germany to Kauai. The Paulo engine was shipped from Germany in 1887 to Koloa Plantation. Carl Isenberg started the Lihue Plantation Railway in 1891.

The Paulo engine remained in active service hauling cane until 1920, when it was retired and put on display by the Koloa Sugar Plantation. Grove Farm Plantation bought the Koloa Sugar Plantation in 1947, and Paulo became property of Grove Farm. Paulo was restored to full operating condition in 1981 after years of preservation work by the Grove Farm Museum and a team of volunteers led by Scott Johnson, who maintains the Grove Farm collection. Johnson grew up on Maui and has worked on almost every steam engine in the state. The Grove Farm Museum locomotives are displayed at the Lihue Plantation Sugar Mill site and run on a revived section of the Lihue Plantation Railroad once a month and on special occasions such as Ohana Day (‘ohana’ translates as ‘family’) in 2010 with the opening of the Kauaʻi Museum exhibition, ‘The Industrial Revolution on Kaua‘i: Steam Power and Other Innovations’. In addition, the museum reconstructed a flat car and a cane car, and has two replicas with benches for passengers.

=== Wainiha ===
The Wainiha, a 1915 locomotive from the Baldwin Locomotive Works in Philadelphia, was originally owned by the McBryde Plantation, and was sold to the Lihue Plantation in 1932. The McBride Plantation introduced two electric locomotives to its operations prior to 1899, when it added two steam engines. Grove Farm Company acquired the Wainiha, named for a stream and valley on Kauaʻi's north shore, in 1957, and it was the last steam locomotive in service for the sugar industry in Hawaii. It is operational, having been restored in 1975. In 2000, the Wainiha was used in filming a World War II drama, To End All Wars, to portray a Japanese train transporting British prisoners of war. The Paulo engine also was in the film.

=== Wahiawa ===
The Wahiawa, also from Baldwin, was designed primarily to pull a passenger train in 1921 for the Kauaʻi Railway Company. Its name was originally Port Allen, after the harbor on the western shore of Kauaʻi and the terminus of that rail line. The engine passed through the hands of the McBryde Sugar Company in 1938 when it acquired its present name, after a stream in west Kauaʻi, and in 1947 was sold to Grove Farm Company. Restoration of this engine is on-going as funds allow.

=== Kaipu ===
The Kaipu, a 1925 engine, also from Baldwin, was one of the last locomotives built for the Hawaiian sugarcane industry. Originally named the Kokee by its first owner, the Hawaiian Sugar Company, it was renamed for one of the plantation's lunas, or foremen, in 1941 when acquired by Grove Farm. This unusual engine has a steel cab, with driving wheels smaller than the other Kauaʻi Baldwins, and external counterweights with main rods connected to the rear drivers. It was retired in 1953, restored in 1983, and is operational.

=== Historic Right-of-Ways ===
In 2004, Grove Farm Museum locomotives began rolling on a short stretch of historic, 2 ft 6 in (762 mm) gauge Lihue Plantation Railroad right-of-way from the Lihue sugar mill to Grove Farm Plantation, along Haleko Road, near the center of modern Lihue. Haleko Road was originally known as Halekoa, or “house of cane” Road.

This right-of-way was unknown when the Grove Farm Museum purchased 7 acres (28,000 m^{2}) from Lihue Plantation Company and another 15 acres (61,000 m^{2}) from William Hyde Rice Ltd. to provide a buffer from development in the area. Only later did the Grove Farm Museum officials discover that the right-of-way for the Lihue Plantation passed through the newly purchased plot, and restored the disused track bed.

== Kauaʻi Plantation Railway ==
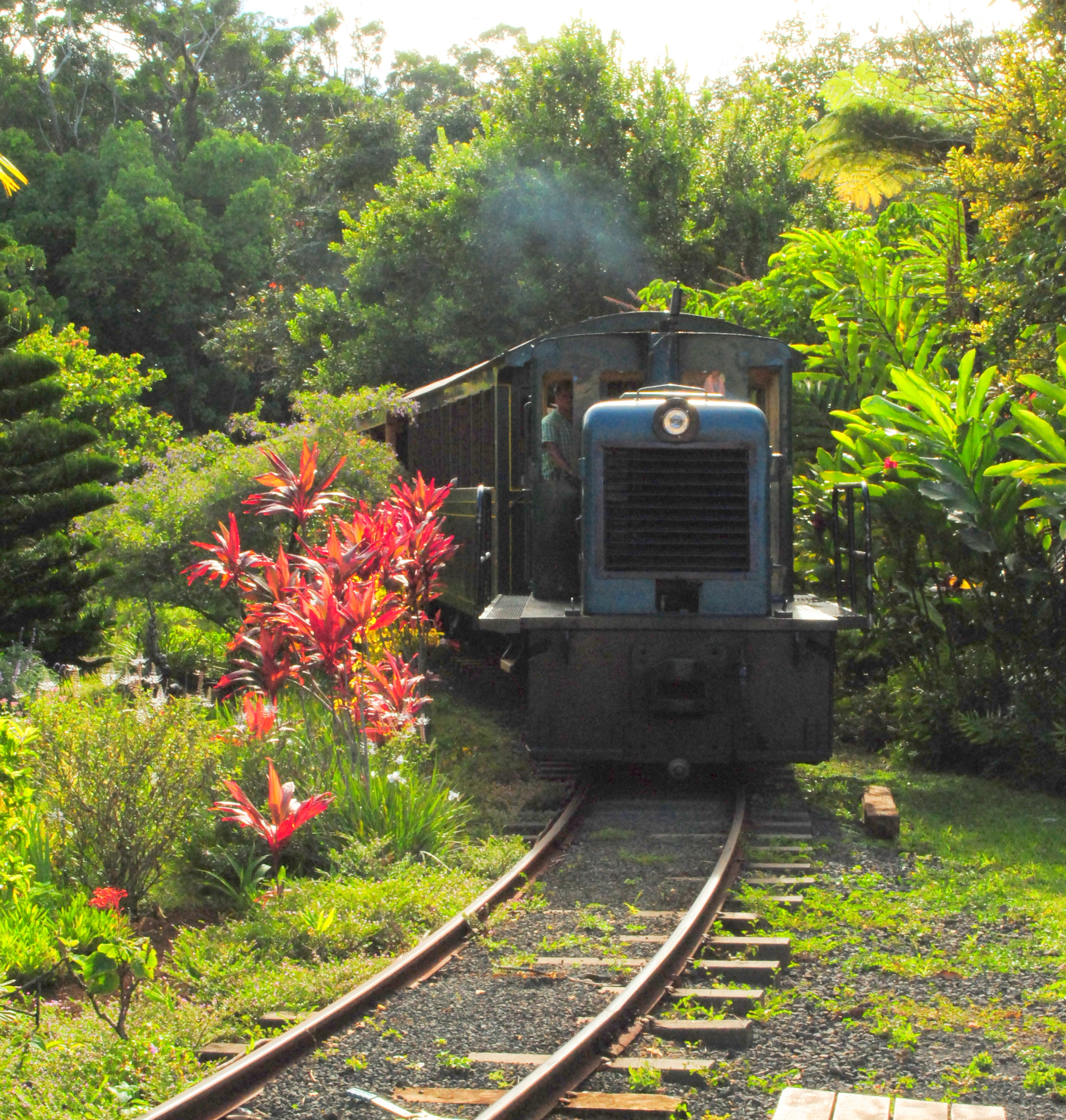
Kauaʻi Plantation Railway

The Kauaʻi Plantation Railway opened for business in January 2007 as “the first new railroad to be built in Hawaii in 100 years.” Indirectly, both the Grove Farm and Kauaʻi Plantation heritage railways share common ancestry. Kauaʻi Plantation Railway offers a tour of Kilohana, the former estate of Gaylord Parke Wilcox (1881–1970), manager of Grove Farm Plantation. His sister, Mabel Wilcox, heir to much of the Wilcox fortune, created Grove Farm Museum from her former family homestead nearby. They were grandchildren of missionary Abner Wilcox (1808–1869), with the fortune grown by their uncles George Norton Wilcox (1839–1933) and Albert Spencer Wilcox (1844–1919).

=== Vintage elements in a modern reconstruction ===
The Kauaʻi Plantation Railway follows a 3-mile (4.8 km) loop through agricultural displays on the historic Kilohana estate and plantation. The Kauaʻi Plantation Railway was designed by Boone Morrison, a historic restoration architect. Its rolling stock is new, but carefully modeled after passenger cars of 1880s trains that operated on the Big Island of Hawaii. The railway has both enclosed coaches and a coach with open sides. The coaches sit on six 35-foot (11 m) flatcars originally built in 1941 at Pearl Harbor by the U.S. Navy, which were then used by the Oahu Railway and Land Company and afterwards sold to White Pass and Yukon Route in Alaska.

The original plan for the railway called for steam engines to pull the coaches, with diesel engines in reserve. The railway opened under the power of a 1948 diesel-electric end-cab two-axle General Electric locomotive, however, with a 1939 two-axle Whitcomb diesel-mechanical locomotive providing backup. Steam locomotives are scheduled to take over from the diesel engines when renovation of a pair of Baldwin outside-frame 0-6-2 tank engines is complete. These steam engines had originally worked at the Honolulu Plantation Company on Oahu prior to World War II. They were purchased for the Kauaʻi Plantation Railway from a company in the Philippines where they had been in service until 2001.

The trains run on rails salvaged from a Soo Line Railroad branch in North Dakota. Most of its 31,680 spikes were driven by hand with 11-pound mauls. The Kauaʻi Plantation Railway is 3 ft (914 mm) gauge, which has no historical precedent in Kauaʻi; most of the previous railways were smaller 2 ft 6 in (762 mm) gauge. The route passes a 16,000-square-foot (1,500 m^{2}) estate home built in 1935 for Gaylord Wilcox. In more recent times, the 105-acre (42 ha) Kilohana Plantation, has been devoted to preserving the island's plantation-era heritage and interpreting it for both locals and tourists. The Kauaʻi Plantation Railway is an outgrowth of this activity, which included horse-drawn carriage rides on the estate. The train passes plots leased by farmers who grow a wide variety of crops, from the culturally important taro to pineapple, papaya, rambutan, tropical hardwood trees, tobacco, and coffee, a more recent cash crop in Kauaʻi. The idea is to show the future of Kauaʻi's agricultural industry in its rich historic and cultural context. It is located at 21°58′15″N 159°23′29″W, just off Route 50.

== End of an era ==
Over 200 miles (320 km) of mostly 2 ft 6 in (762 mm) gauge track existed in 1915 in Kauaʻi. By 1959, Kauai railroads were replaced by trucks. Today, even the trucks are gone, and the last sugar plantation on Kauaʻi, Gay & Robinson, processed its last crop in October 2009.

== See also ==
- Media related to Heritage railways in Hawaii at Wikimedia Commons
- List of heritage railroads in the United States
- Ahukini Terminal and Railway Company
- Kauaʻi Railway
- List of Hawaii railroads
