= Port Allen, Hawaii =

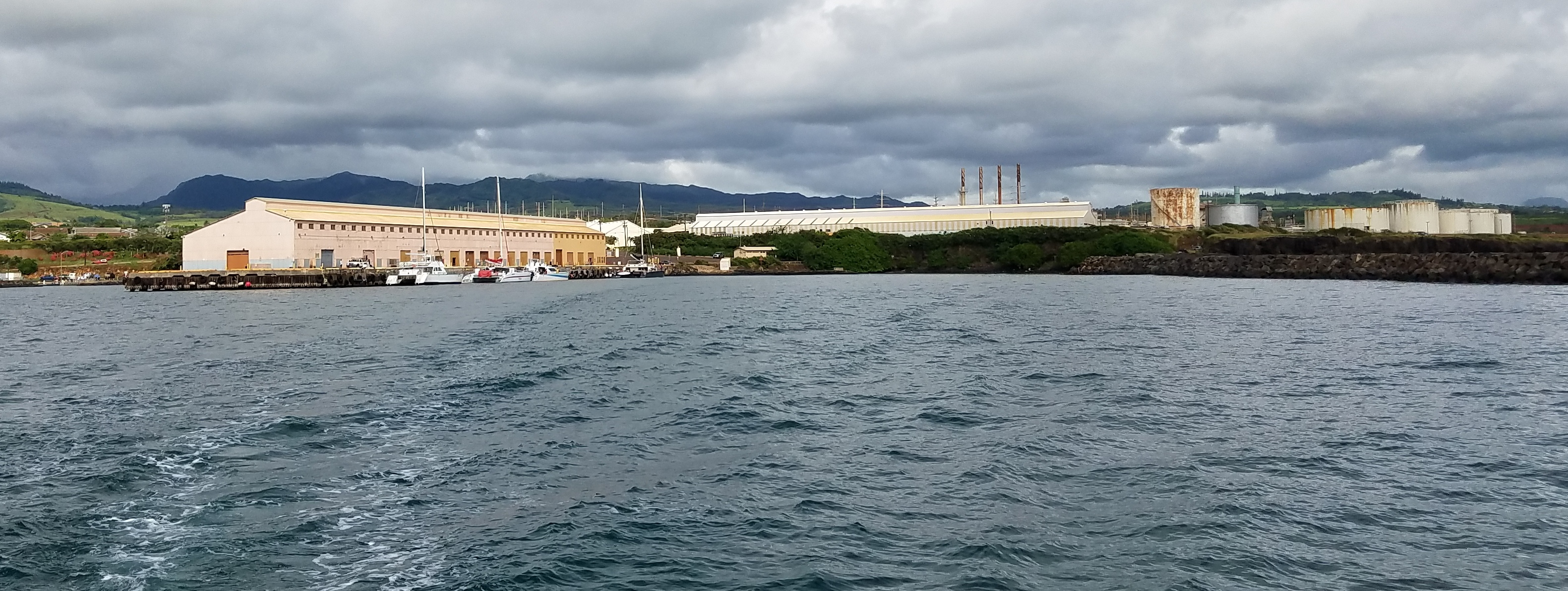

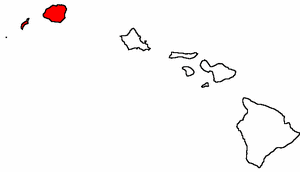
- Location in Kauaʻi County and the state of Hawaii
- Coordinates: 21°54′13″N 159°35′14″W
- Country: United States
- State: Hawaii
- County: Kauaʻi
- Time zone: UTC-10 (Hawaii-Aleutian)
- Area code: 808
- GNIS feature ID: 0363427

Port Allen is a populated place at Hanapepe Bay, 20 nautical miles from Nawiliwili, in Kauaʻi County, in the U.S. state of Hawaii. Originally named ʻEleʻele Landing, terminal owner Kauai Railway renamed it for Honolulu business man and port financial backer Samuel Clesson Allen. When the Civilian Conservation Corps Camp in Koke'e State Park was built in 1935, the lumber for the camp was floated in saltwater as a built-in deterrent to termites, and brought ashore at Port Allen. Captain James Cook landed on Kauaʻi in this area. The facilities were demolished in 1982 by Hurricane Iwa, but eventually rebuilt.
