= Kahului Railroad =

Defunct railroad on the island of Maui

Kahului RR
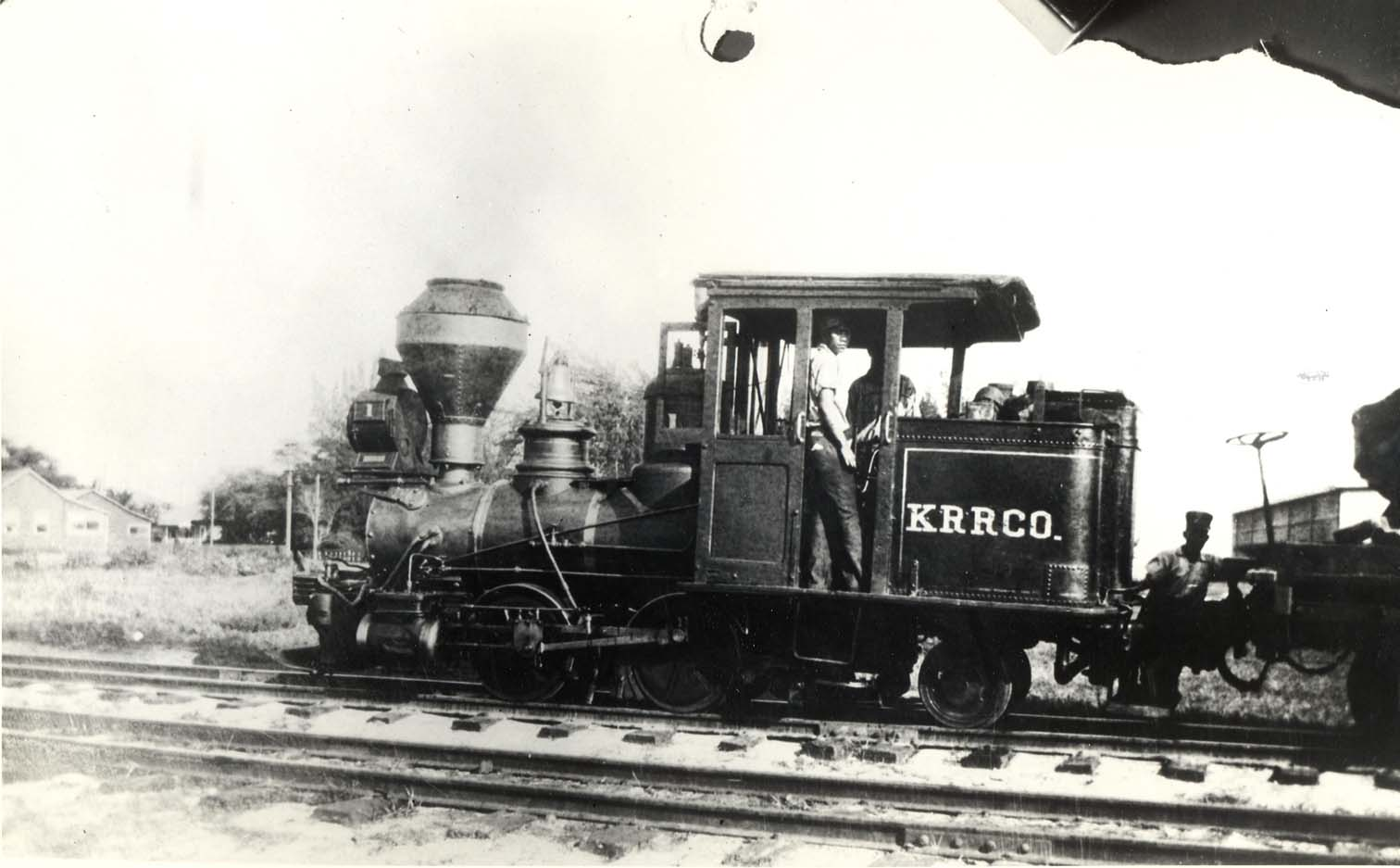
- Kahului Railroad #1, "Claus Spreckels". Now owned by the Alexander & Baldwin Sugar museum on Maui

Technical
- Line length: 15 miles (24 km)
- Track gauge: 3 ft (914 mm)

The Kahului Railroad (KRR) was formerly a common carrier railway company in Hawaii (United States). It operated on 3 ft (914 mm) narrow gauge track 15 miles (24 km) in length from Wailuku to Kuiaha on the north coast of the island of Maui. The company continues today as Kahului Trucking & Storage. It continues to be a subsidiary of Alexander & Baldwin.

== History ==
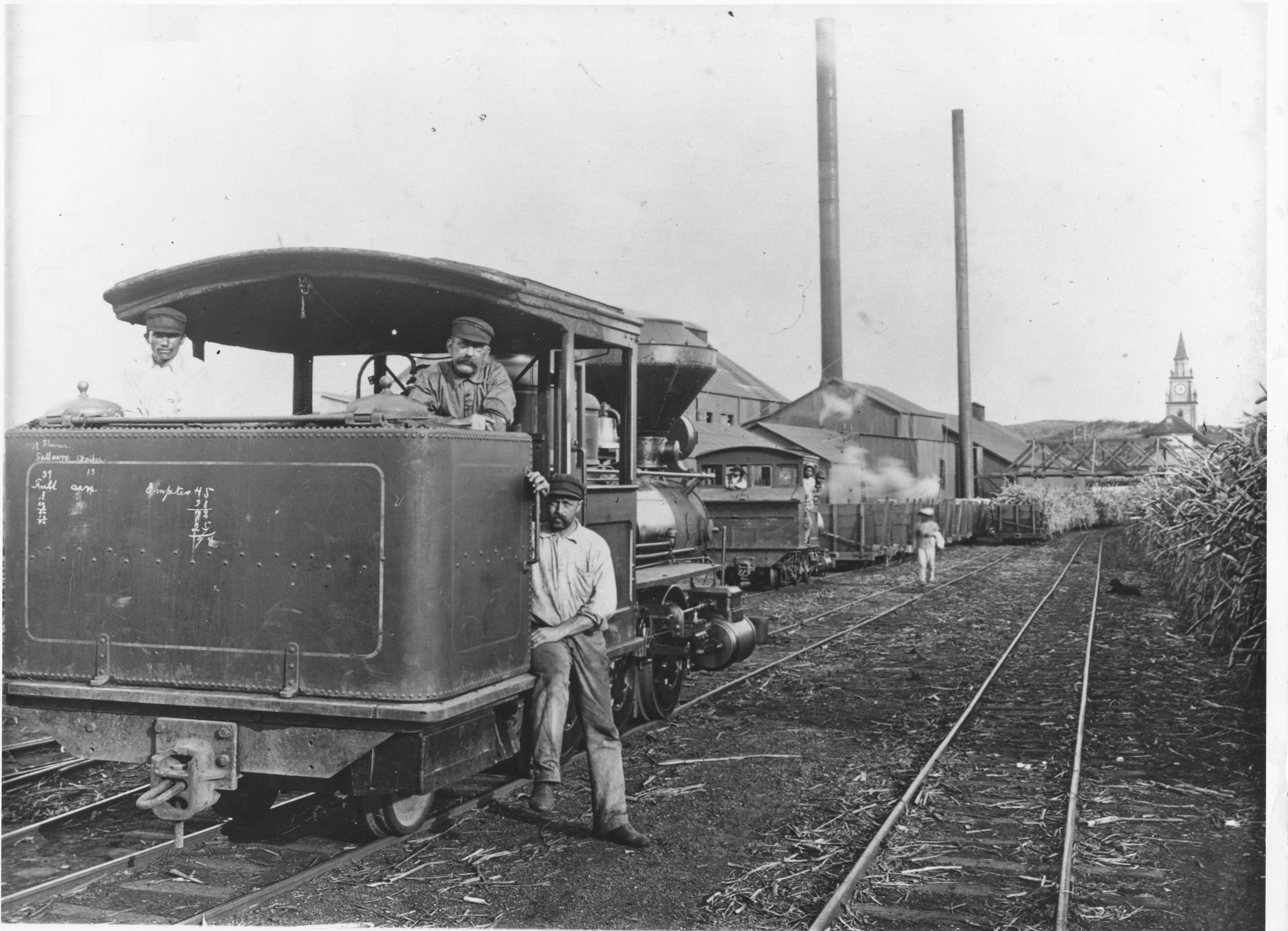
Sugar cane trains at Kahului Sugar Mill

After the US government of the Hawaiian government had allowed sugar to be exported duty-free in 1876, the sugar industry experienced a strong upswing. The head of the postal authority of Kahului, Thomas H. Hobron, saw the need to transport the sugar quickly to the ports and on 17 July 1879 opened a railway line from Wailuku to the harbor in Kahului under the name Kahului & Wailuku Railroad. The first passenger train ran on 29 July 1879. In September 1879, construction was completed on this section. The track was the first public railway in the Kingdom of Hawaii. Scheduled mixed trains operated from Tuesday to Friday. On 21 September 1880, the extension to Pāʻia was opened. From 1 July 1881 rail operations operated under the name Kahului Railroad Company.

From 1884, the branch to Spreckelsville was in operation. From 1894 until the annexation of the Hawaiian Islands by the United States in 1900, Kahului Railroad Company used its own stamps for the transport of mail that were produced by the American Bank Note Company. In 1899, the railroad was acquired by the Hawaiian Commercial & Sugar Co. In 1906, the railway company built from the port of Kahului.

The line was extended again on 8 February 1913. The railway crossed the Maliko Gulch via a steel bridge to reach Haʻikū and Kuiaha. The bridge was with a height of 230 ft (70 m) above the valley floor the highest railway bridge in Hawaii, and had a length of 682 ft (208 m).

The railway was from 1959, the last public railway in the state of Hawai'i and after a total of almost 87 years, the organization with the longest operating time. The railroad was decommissioned on 22 May 1966, and subsequently degraded. The tracks and some vehicles were used for the construction of Lahaina, Kaanapali and Pacific Railroad, a tourist train in the west of the island. The company continues today as Kahului Trucking & Storage.

== Surviving Rolling Stock ==
- (2-6-2), 3 ft (914 mm) B-3-E-class oil-fueled locomotive No. 12, built in 1928 by Baldwin Locomotive Works, Philadelphia, builder's plate #60690. Now operated by the Georgetown Loop Railroad, Georgetown, Colorado.
