= Hawaiian Railway Society =

Museum in Ewa Gentry, Hawaii

Coordinates: 21.331917°N 158.045967°W

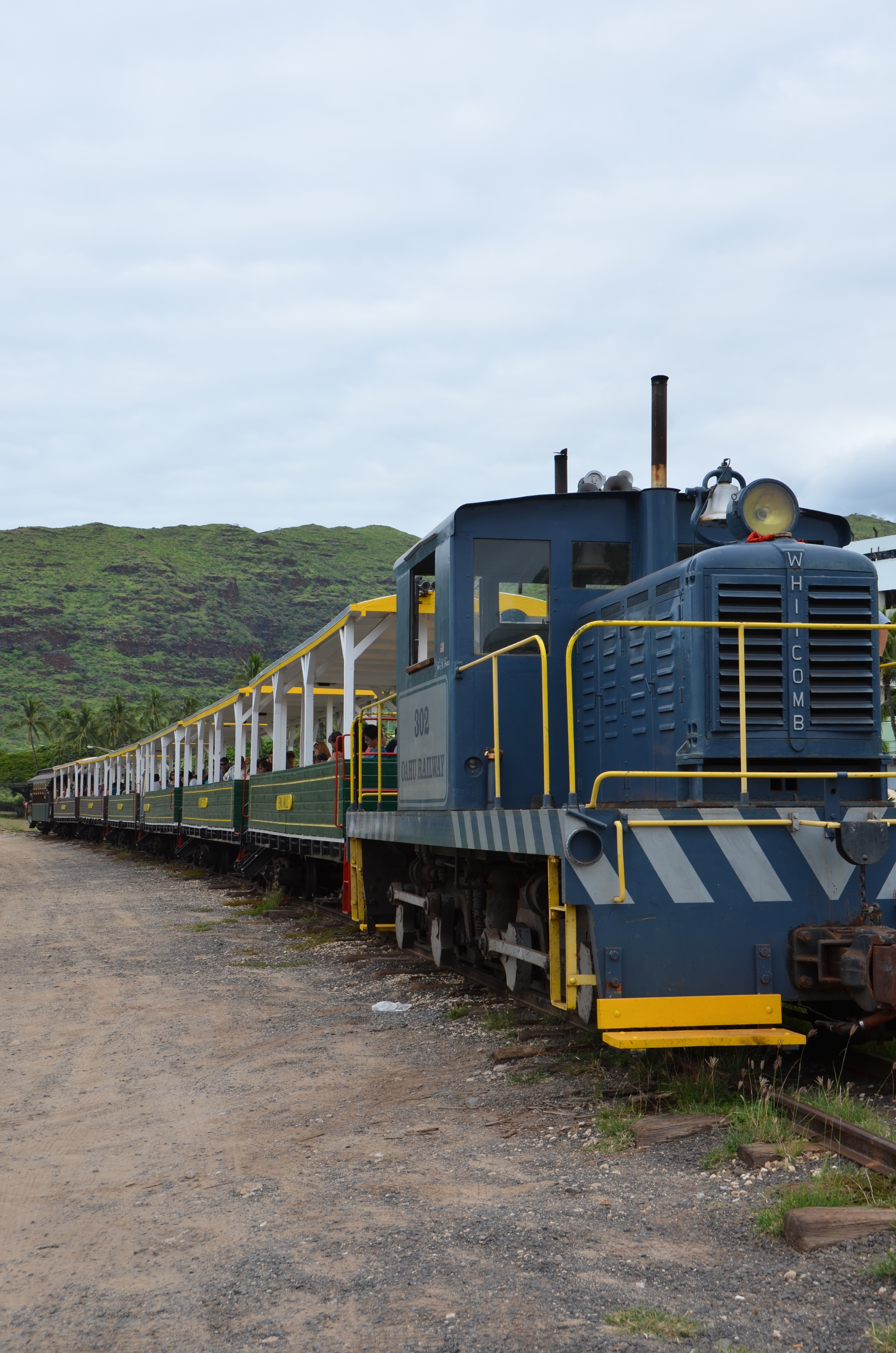
- Ex US Navy #302, a 45 tonner Whitcomb locomotive, at Kahe Point.

Overview
- Headquarters: Ewa Villages, Hawaii
- Locale: Honolulu County, Hawaii, USA
- Dates of operation: 1982–present

Technical
- Track gauge: 3 ft (914 mm)

Other
- Website: http://www.hawaiianrailway.com/

The Hawaiian Railway Society is a 3 ft (914 mm) narrow gauge heritage railroad and railroad museum in Ewa, Hawaii, USA, on the island of Oahu. It uses the trackbed of the defunct Oahu Railway and Land Company. It is currently the only operating railroad museum in the U.S State of Hawaii.

== History ==
In 1970, Waialua Agricultural Co. said it would scrap its 0-6-2T locomotive No. 6 because rust and deterioration had reduced the engine to an unsightly liability and posed a danger to children who played on it. John Knaus then contacted Bill Paty, then manager of Waialua Agricultural Company, about saving and restoring the locomotive. John then contacted his boss, Captain Henry Davies, of the Naval Ammunition Depot, Lualualei about having the locomotive moved there since it had the only locomotive facility left on Oahu. This was followed by a letter to Ed Bernsten of the National Railway Historical Society seeking information on organizing a local chapter. John received approval to have No. 6 restored at Lualualei. He then talked to Nick Carter, another rail fan who had expressed interest in saving the Navy mainline on the leeward coast for an operating railroad.

On August 22, 1970, John Knaus, Nick Carter, Luman Wilcox, and Ken Peale met to discuss forming a local chapter of the NRHS. Wilcox was appointed to draw up the temporary by-laws. On August 27 an organizational meeting was held at Cocco's Restaurant with 15 people in attendance. Wilcox successfully proposed forming a local chapter of the NRHS. Thirteen of the fifteen people present signed up. Nominated and elected were: Luman Wilcox for pres., Ken Peale for VP, Nick Carter for Secretary-Treasurer, and John Knaus for National Director. On Oct 9, 1970 the membership met to approve the By-Laws and Charter Night was set for Nov. 13th at Bishop Museum.

On February 17, 1971 a Waialua Agricultural Co. trailer was used to transport WA Co. 6 to Lualualei. Waialua Elementary School students gave the old locomotive a sendoff before it left Waialua. No. 6 was a magnet that brought a group of talent to Lualualei shortly after. A boiler maker named Dave Griner, a welder named Dick Marshall and a machinist named Bob Haney were all joined by others who wanted to lend a hand. On October 13 the Hawaii Chapter of the National Railway Historical Society was granted a charter.

On October 13, 1971 The State of Hawaii, Department of Regulatory Agencies granted the Hawaii Chapter of the National Railway Historical Society a charter of incorporation. The use of Hawaii Chapter, NRHS posed a problem: the name was too long and it really did not say anything about local railroading. At a membership meeting on December 19, 1973, the members voted to use the name of Hawaiian Railway Society without severing itself from the NRHS.

On November 25, 1972, a Saturday, a dedication ceremony marked the restoration of No. 6 after 84 Sundays of restoration work, This educational, non-profit organization was able to get the remaining stretch of track on Oahu, (from Ewa to Nanakuli), placed on the State and National Register of Historic Places. As of early 2009, the Society has restored about 6.5 miles (10.5 km) and is working to restore more.

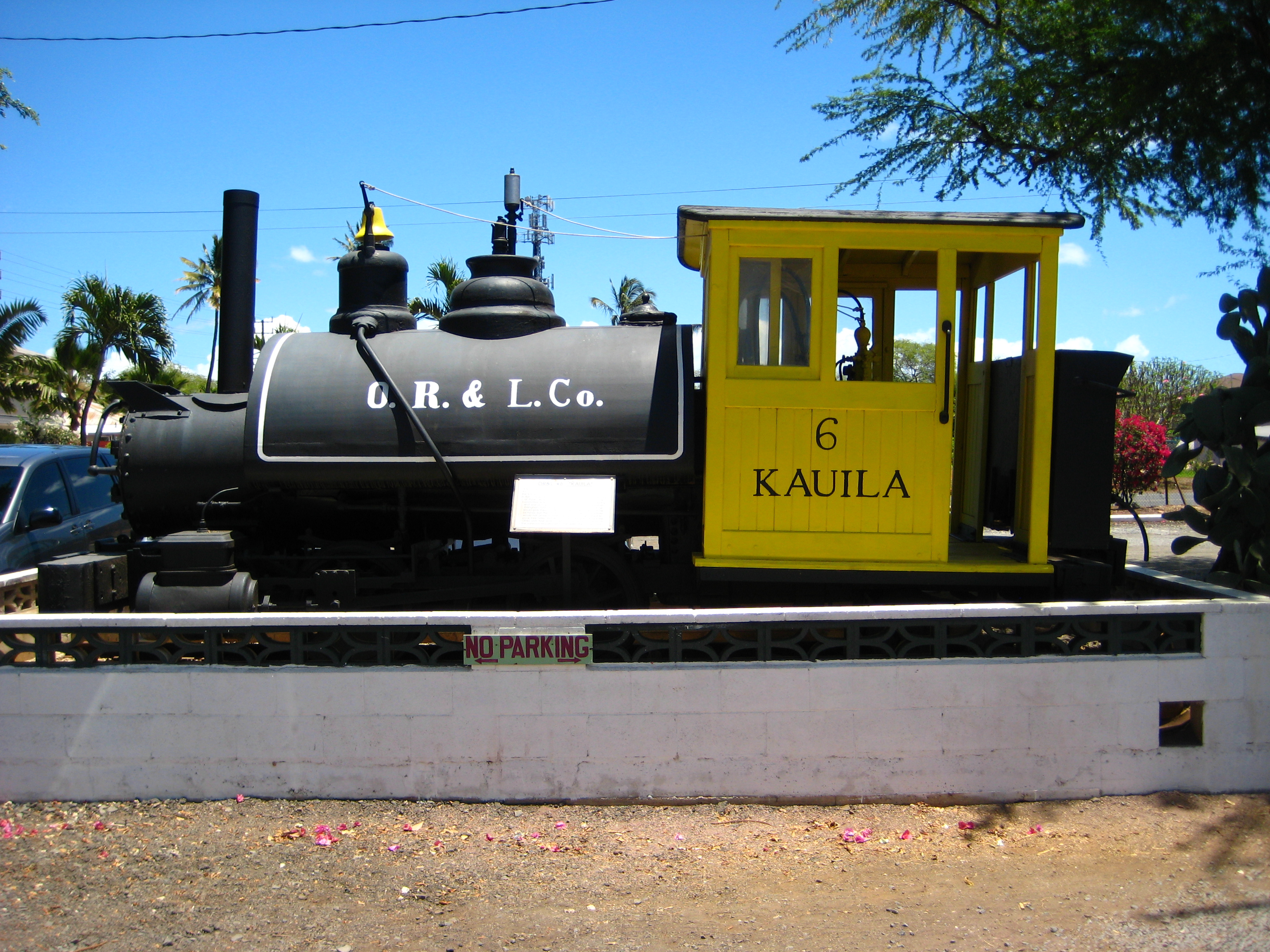
O. R. & L. Co. No. 6, an 0-4-2T

A usual consist features open-air cars built on ex-US Army flatcars. The Hawaiian Railway also rosters a Parlor/Observation car that is used for private excursions. Rolling stock also includes the Merci train boxcar, one of 49 boxcars given to the U.S. by the French railways. One boxcar was sent to each of the 48 states, while the one in the Hawaiian Railway collection was representative of Washington, D.C., as well as the then territory of Hawaii.

== Operating locomotives ==
Four vintage diesels have been restored to operation, three for excursion trains and one as a switcher. The U.S. Navy on Oahu donated three diesels and the U.S. Army donated one locomotive in the 1970s.

Operating diesels include:

- #423, An ex-USNX Whitcomb 45-Ton switcher.
- #302, An ex-USNX Whitcomb 45-Ton switcher.
- #174, An ex-USNX Whitcomb 65-Ton switcher.
- #7750, An ex-US Army GE 25-Ton switcher.

== Steam locomotives ==
- #85, Oahu Railway and Land Company (OR&LC), American Locomotive Company (ALCO) 4-6-0 (Last remaining Hawaiian road engine)
- #12, OR&LC, ALCO 0-6-0 Slopeback tender engine (Last remaining Hawaiian switching engine)
- #6, OR&LC (Kauila), Baldwin Locomotive Works 0-4-2T engine (First locomotive Purchased by the OR&L)
- #6, Waialua Agricultural Company, an 0-6-2T engine (Only locomotive built in the state of Hawaii)
- #1, Ewa Plantation Company, Baldwin Locomotive Works 0-4-2T engine

== Speeders/MOW ==
- Speeder(Pop car) #233809 (Ex LK&P Fairmont Railway Motors)
- Railcar, Inspection (MOW) #62-00249 (Ex U.S. Navy by Kalamazoo Manufacturing Company)
- Hand car, ex OR&L (Shefield-Fairbanks-Morse)
- Spray car (MOW), ex OR&L Pacific Chemical & Fertilizer Co. Honolulu

== Other engines ==
- Two 2 ft (610 mm) mining electric locomotives used in the Red Hill operations have been cosmetically restored, along with one of their dump cars.

== See also ==
- List of heritage railroads in the United States
