= Ahukini Terminal and Railway Company =

Railroad company in Hawaii, United States

The Ahukini Terminal and Railway was a narrow gauge railroad company in Hawaii, United States. It operated a 2 ft 6 in (762 mm) narrow gauge, 19-kilometre (12 mi) long line from the port of Anahola to Lihue on the east coast of the island of Kauai. It did not connect to the other railroad on the island, the Kauai Railway, built in the same track gauge. The railroad was opened 1920 and acquired in 1932 by local customers. The last train ran in 1959. Part of the line is now the Ke Ala Hele Makalae Path Rail trail.

== See also ==
- Heritage railroads
- List of heritage railroads in the United States
