= Grove Farm (Līhuʻe, Hawaii) =

Historic house in Hawaii, United States

- U.S. National Register of Historic Places
- U.S. Historic district
- Hawaiʻi Register of Historic Places
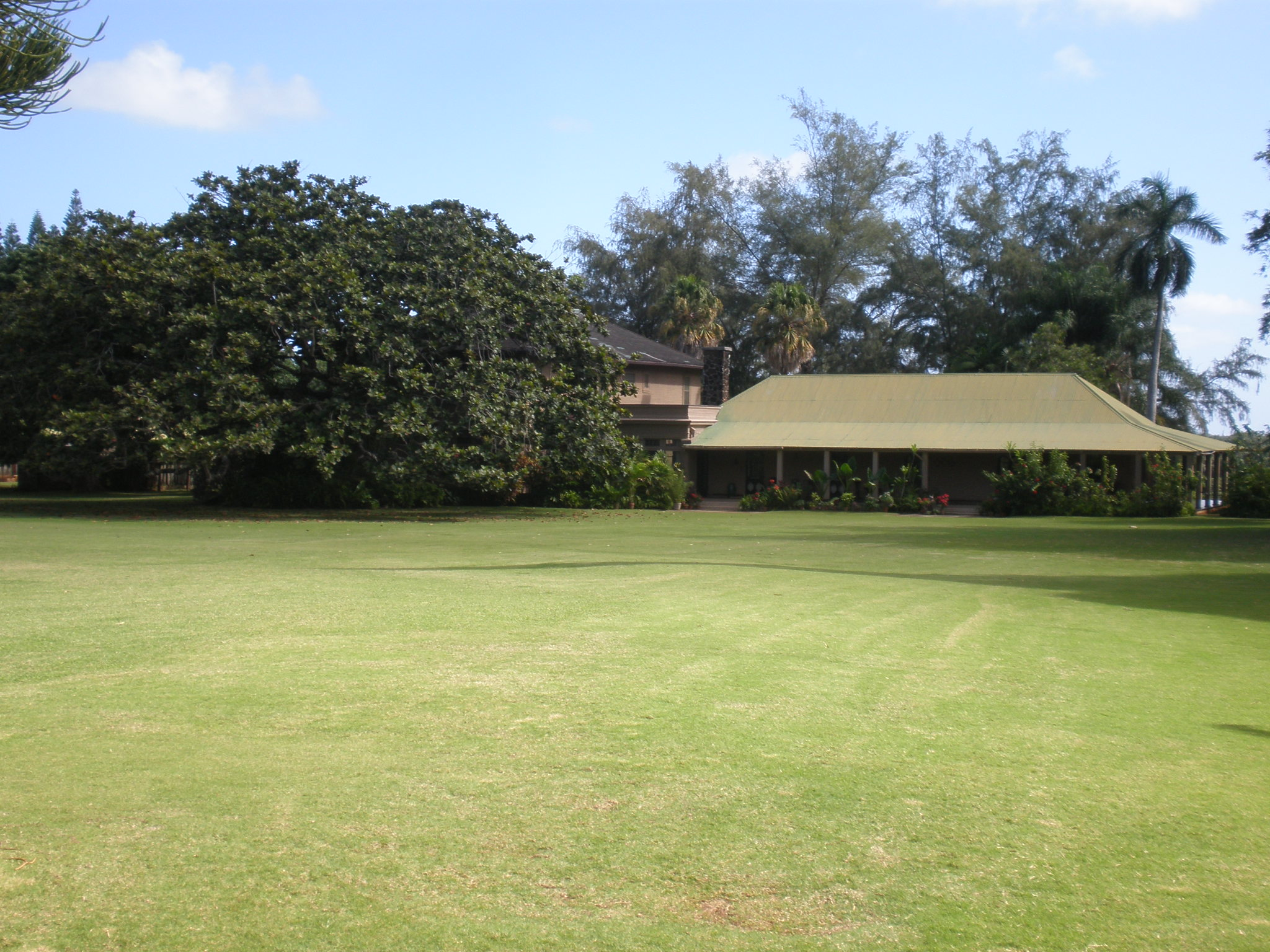
- Wilcox residence, Grove Farm, Kauaʻi

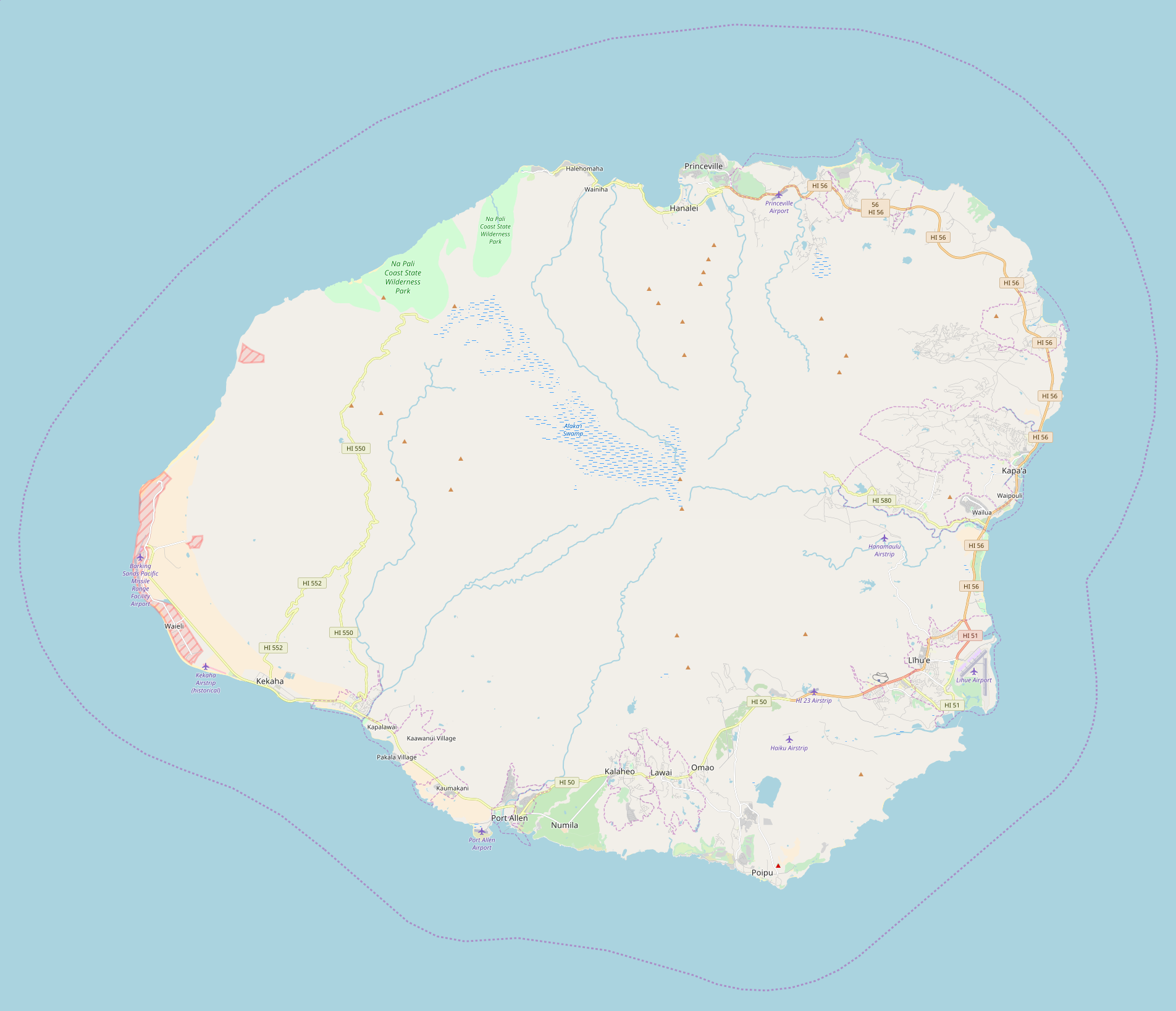
- Location within Kauai Location within Hawaii
- Location: On Hawaii Route 58, southeast of Lihue, Hawaii
- Coordinates: 21°57′57″N 159°22′5″W
- Area: 81.79 acres (33.10 ha)
- Built: 1854
- Architect: Charles William Dickey
- NRHP reference No.: 74000722 (original); 78003436 (increase)
- HRHP No.: 50-30-11-09301

Significant dates
- Added to NRHP: June 25, 1974
- Boundary increase: December 8, 1978
- Designated HRHP: August 9, 1971 (Original); July 24, 1978 (Boundary increase)

Grove Farm is a historic agricultural site on Kauaʻi in the Hawaiian Islands.

== History ==
German immigrant Hermann A. Widemann (1822–1899) started one of the first sugarcane plantations in Hawaii known as Grove Farm in 1854. During the American Civil War, the demand for Hawaii sugar grew, but Widemann supported the Confederate States. After leasing Grove Farm to its manager George Norton Wilcox (1839–1933) in November 1864, Widemann moved to Honolulu to work in the capital as a supreme court judge. Wilcox would later buy the plantation, and it remained in the family for over 100 years. Wilcox had an irrigation system built to bring water from the wet mountains to the flatter lower elevations where the crops were grown. This idea was later copied by many other planters in the islands.

In 1881, Princess Ruth Keʻelikolani sold some adjoining land, which grew the acreage by about a factor of ten. In 1903, the family hired Charles William Dickey to design a house for Ralph Wilcox and his wife Daisy Rice. Dickey also supervised a renovation of the main house in 1915 which removed interior walls to create large open spaces. From 1913 to 1917, a row of small houses were built for plantation workers. The houses were called Kaipu Camp after the Hawaiian name for a Chinese foreman of the plantation.

The main estate house has two bedrooms, writing room, two bathrooms, and a library on the first floor. A grand staircase leads up to the second floor which has more bedrooms. Behind the main house is a hexagonal gazebo styled after a Japanese teahouse, built in 1898. To the south is a guest cottage with two living areas from about 1890. Another single story cottage was built in 1877 for George Wilcox, and an office building was built in 1884. A number of support buildings include sheds and a garage.

Wilcox died in 1933, and the farm was left to nieces and nephews. This included the six children of his brother Samuel Wilcox (1847–1929) and Emma Lyman (1849–1943), daughter of missionary David Belden Lyman. During World War II the farm started to diversify by growing other food crops to feed the growing population of the islands, including the military. In 1948, Grove Farm purchased the 3,000-acre (1,200 ha) McBryde plantation which included the Koloa sugar mill. By 1974, sugar production was leased to Alexander & Baldwin, while the company moved into residential and resort real estate operations.

The Wilcox estate was added to the National Register of Historic Places listings in Hawaii on June 25, 1974, as site 74000722. Its boundary was adjusted to total 81.79 acres (33.10 ha) on December 8, 1978, and site changed to 78003436.

The main house is now a private museum, the Grove Farm Sugar Plantation Museum, with tours by appointment. It is located on Hawaii Route 58, known as Nawiliwili Road. The 2 ft 6 in (762 mm) narrow gauge Grove Farm Company Locomotives were stored in a warehouse just to the west in the area known as Puhi, also listed on the NRHP, and formerly owned by Mabel Wilcox. Some of the restored trains can be ridden about once a month at the site of the Lihue Plantation Sugar Mill nearby.

In the 1990s, all sugarcane production ended in the area. A golf course designed for the former plantation called Puakea was partially built when Hurricane Iniki hit in 1992. It opened with ten holes in 1997. Later, it was developed into a full, 18-hole golf course. In 2000, the Grove Farm Company (not including the Museum) was bought by Steve Case. In July 2001, he also bought the neighboring Lihue plantation from Amfac, for a total of about 40,000 acres (16,000 ha). Case's grandfather A. Hebard Case had worked on the plantation. He paid US$25 million and assumed $60 million of debt, but was sued by Wilcox family shareholders since his father had served as lawyer for the Grove Farm company. The lawsuit went to court but was dismissed in 2008. Case has proposed more development, characterized as green building.
