= Kauai Railway =

Defunct railroad on the island of Kauaʻi

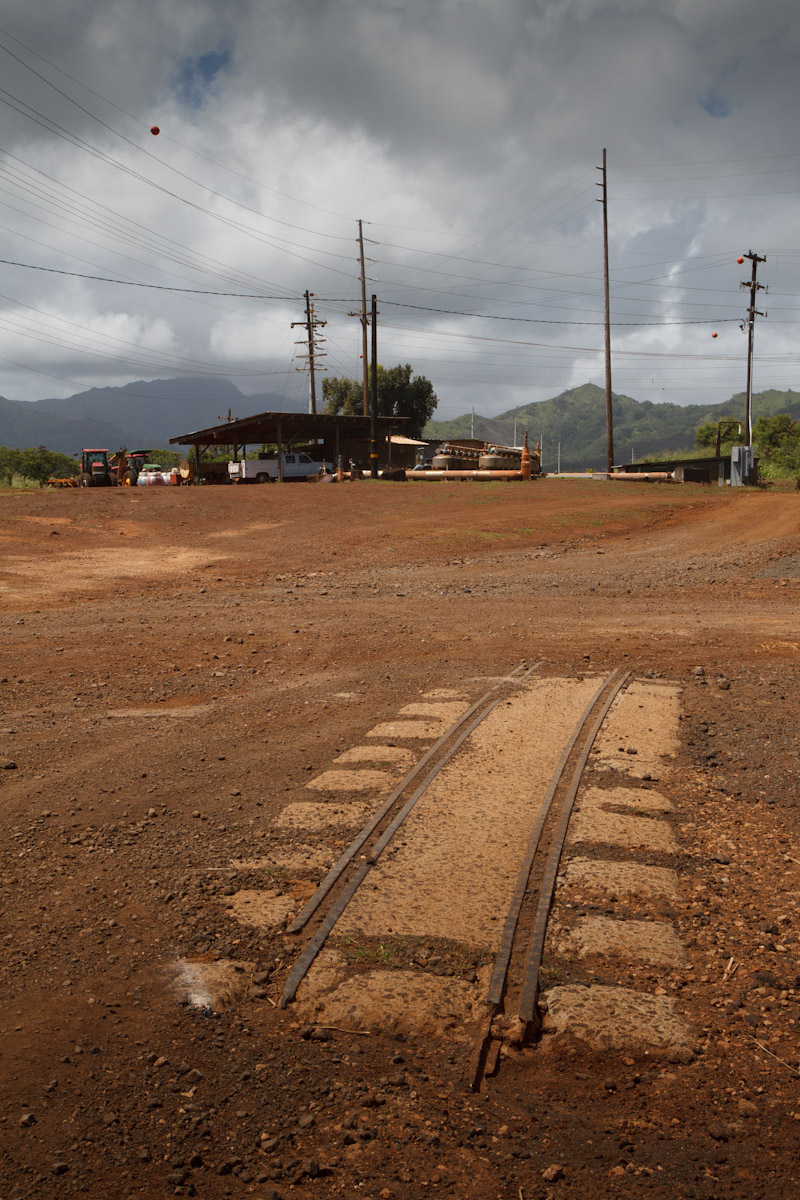
- Remnant of Kauai Railway track

Overview
- Locale: South shore of Kauaʻi, Territory of Hawaii
- Dates of operation: 1906–1933
- Successor: Kauai Terminal, Ltd.

Technical
- Track gauge: 2 ft 6 in (762 mm)
- Length: 19 miles (31 km)

The Kauai Railway (Kauai Railway Company, Ltd.) was a 2 ft 6 in (762 mm) narrow-gauge common carrier railroad on the south shore of Kauaʻi. Established in 1906, it hauled sugar and other freight for the island's sugar plantations over about 19 miles of track between Port Allen and the Koloa sugar mill. Apart from a short period of passenger service during World War I, the railroad carried only freight. The company stopped running the railroad in 1933, handing control of the tracks to the plantations. The company subsequently renamed itself to Kauai Terminal, Ltd. (later the Kauai Commercial Company) and became a subsidiary of Alexander & Baldwin before formally winding down operations in 2013.

== History ==
A bill to create a Kauai railway was first proposed by the Hawaii Legislature in 1903, which would have established a fenced railroad throughout Kauai. It was formally established as a business on May 29, 1906 and was primarily financed by H. M. Van Holt, who held the franchise rights to build a railroad on the island. The railway began operations by 1908, running freight from the island's farms to its ports. Initially, the company was established so that the island's sugar plantations would not need to also run shipping of their products themselves, and the railway shared management with the McBryde Sugar Company.

In 1909, the company established its terminus at the harbor in Port Allen, which it both named and retained private ownership of until the 1930s. Between 1910 and 1912, the company adopted agreements with multiple agriculture companies, handling rail transportation for all of them.

The company's operation of the railway came to an end in 1933, with the island's various sugar plantations taking ownership of the tracks. The remaining rail operations along the lines ended in 1947. The company later became Kauai Terminal, Ltd., and then Kauai Commercial Company, a subsidiary of Alexander & Baldwin; in 2013, after the closure of Kauai's last sugar plantation, it announced it would end its trucking operations.

== Operations ==
At its peak, Kauai Railway operated a 19-mile, 30-inch gauge track along Kauai's south shore. The line ran from Port Allen to Koloa Mill, with branches to meet the private tracks of sugar plantations on the island. In 1930, the company owned two locomotives and 74 freight cars. The railroad exclusively carried freight except for a brief period during World War I, when it carried passengers as well. The lines the railway operated on were electric.

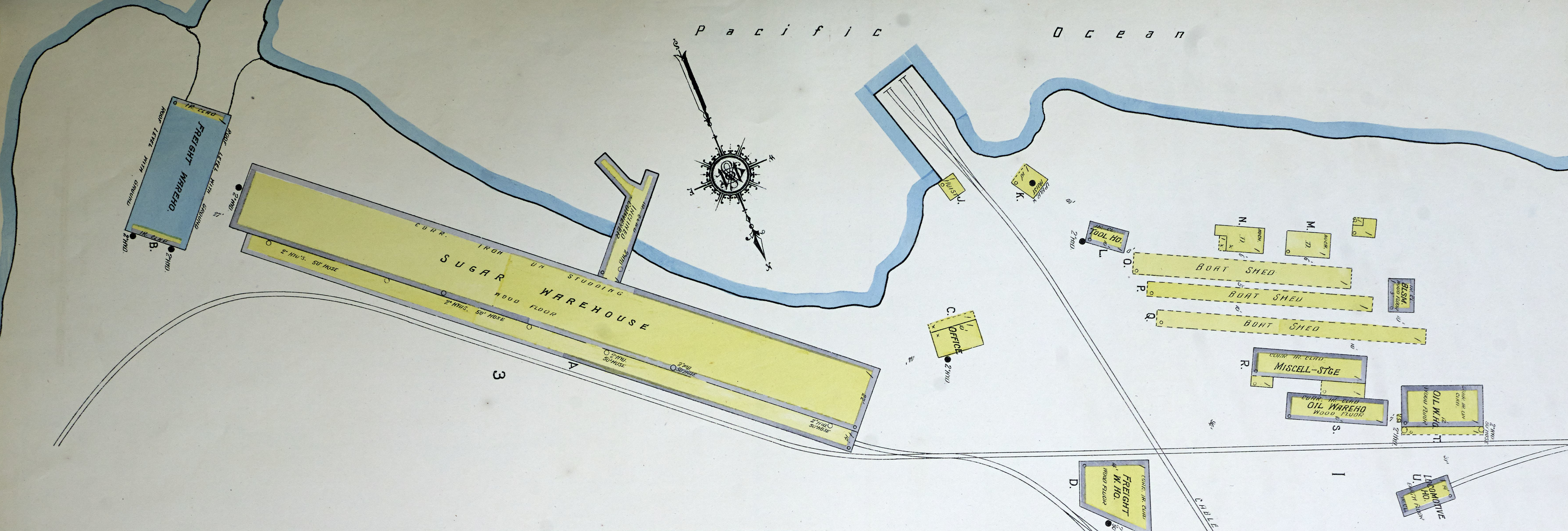
Kauai Railway Company's terminal located at Port Allen in 1919 Sanborn fire insurance map.
