= Lahaina, Kaanapali and Pacific Railroad =

Transport company

Coordinates: 20.8804°N 156.6789°W

Lahaina, Kaanapali and Pacific Railroad (LKPRR)
- Locale: Lahaina, Hawaii

Preserved operations
- Owned by: Craig Hill
- Reporting mark: LK&P
- Length: 6 miles (9.7 km)
- Preserved gauge: 3 ft (914 mm)

Commercial history
- Opened: 1970
- Closed: 2014

The Lahaina, Kaanapali and Pacific Railroad (LKPRR) was a steam-powered, 3 ft (914 mm) narrow gauge heritage railroad in Lāhainā, Hawaii. The LKPRR operated the Sugar Cane Train, a 6-mile (9.7 km), 40-minute trip in open-air coaches pulled by vintage steam locomotives. The tracks connected Lahaina with Puukolii, stopping briefly at Kaanapali. A narrator pointed out sites of interest during the trip, which crossed a 325-foot (99 m) curved wooden trestle whose elevation yielded panoramic views of neighboring islands and the West Maui Mountains. The line closed in 2014.

== History ==
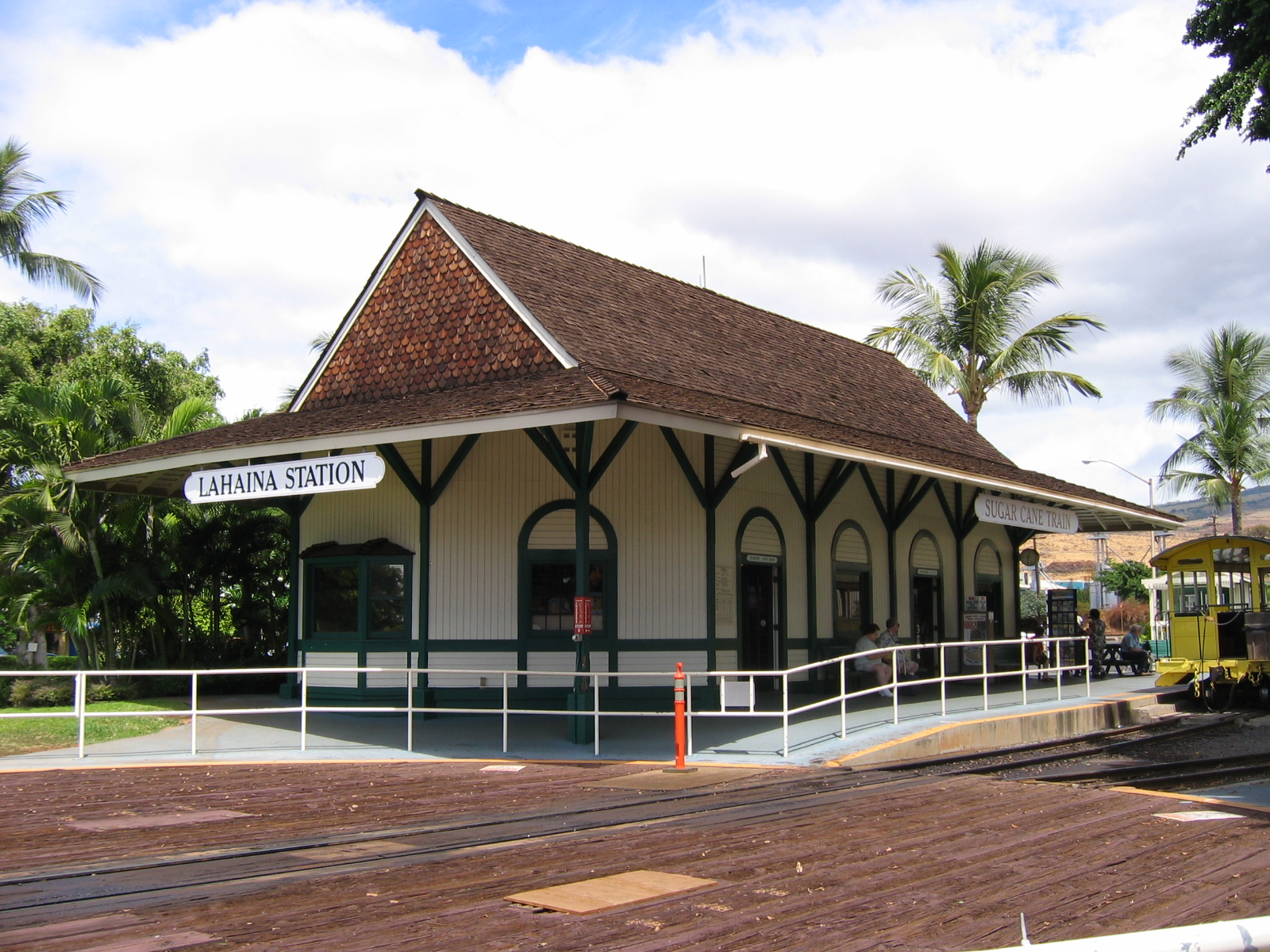
Lahaina Station

The line followed a 6-mile (9.7 km) stretch of historic right-of-way originally constructed to haul sugarcane from the sugarcane plantation fields in Kāʻanapali to the Pioneer Mill in Lahaina. At one time, the island had over 200 miles (320 km) of rails connecting the sugarcane plantations to the mills. Trucks, however, largely replaced the railroads by the middle 20th century. In 1969, A.W. "Mac" McKelvey and the Makai Corporation created the railroad in order to illustrate this part of Hawaii's past.

On July 24, 2014, the company announced that it would be closing on August 1, 2014, due to financial difficulties. The company was put up for sale as a going concern.

Within months of closing, the Sugar Cane Train was bought by a local Maui resident, Craig Hill, owner of Maui Concierge Services. Hill felt that the Sugar Cane Train needed to be kept running in order to preserve one of Lahaina's best-known attractions. The Sugar Cane Train ran seasonal "Holiday Express" trains, which run on a short stretch of track in Kaanapali. These trains ran from late November up to December 25. The full line was in the process of being revived.

The company planned to rebuild all three locomotives from the ground up, as well as possibly add grade crossings to prevent accidents. Plans for the Sugar Cane Train also includes hosting weddings as well as running an evening train. The old tracks were being removed and were being replaced with newer ties and rails. Although the official website stated that operations would resume in 2018, the only trips that operated were the Holiday Express trains. In a 2018 interview, the co-owner of the railroad, Lahaina businessman Todd Domeck stated that the railroad aimed to return to full operations in May 2019, however the railroad did not open. In July 2021, the entire railroad (including track, but excluding right-of-way land) was listed for sale for $400,000 by the Ozark Mountain Railcar brokerage firm. The sale listing indicates that the buyer will be obligated to dismantle and remove the railroad track materials and rolling stock from the site, as no land is included in the sale.

On August 8, 2023, the Lahaina station, turntable, and eastern half of the railroad were all destroyed in the Lahaina fire. Much of the railroad's equipment, as well as the sheds, was not affected due to being north of the fire's path.

On August 4, 2025, another fire in Kaanapali damaged or destroyed most of the remaining rolling stock. In September 2026, all equipment including the two fire damaged steam locomotives was scrapped.

== Motive power ==
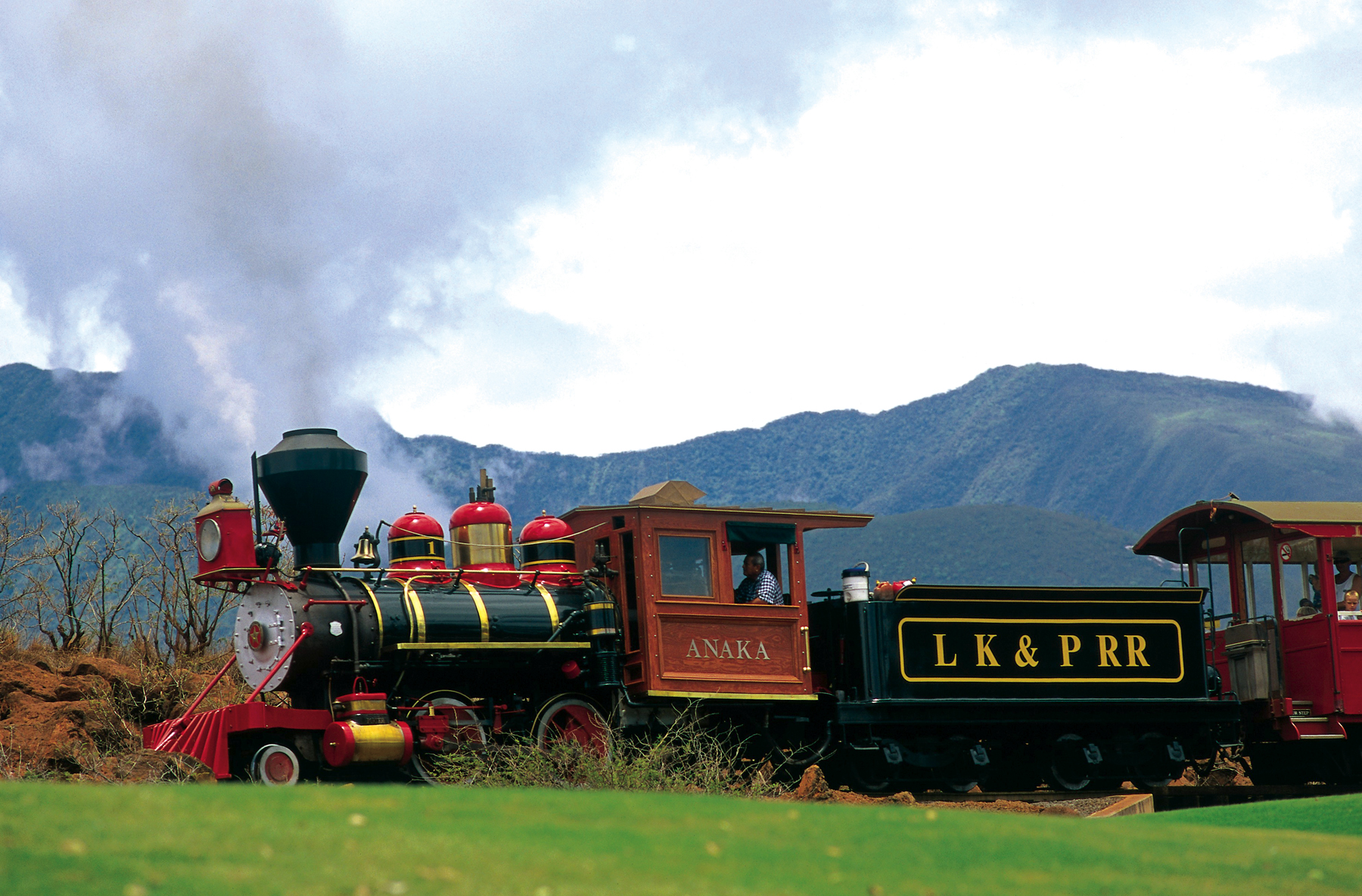
No. 1, Anaka

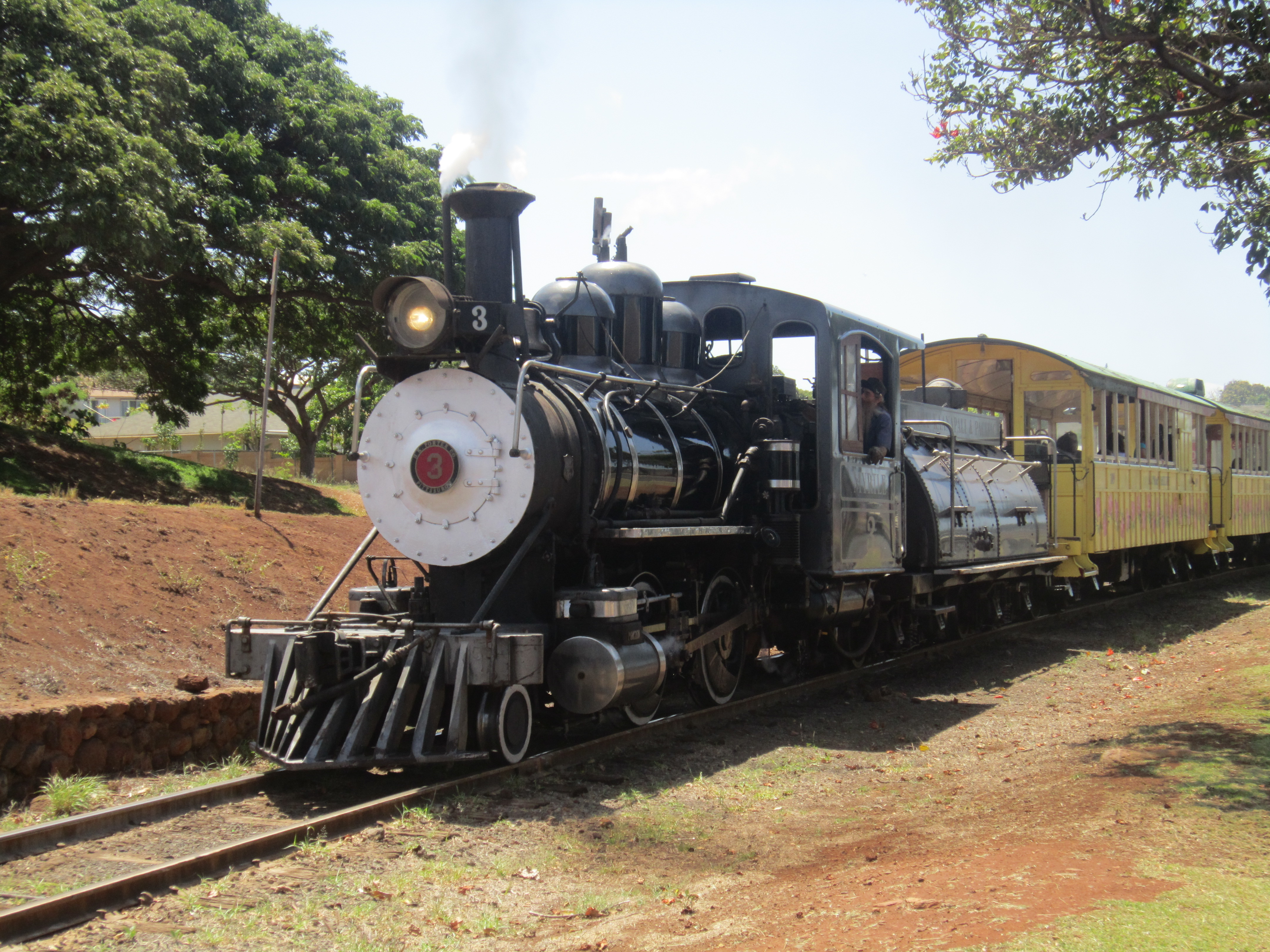
No.3 Myrtle

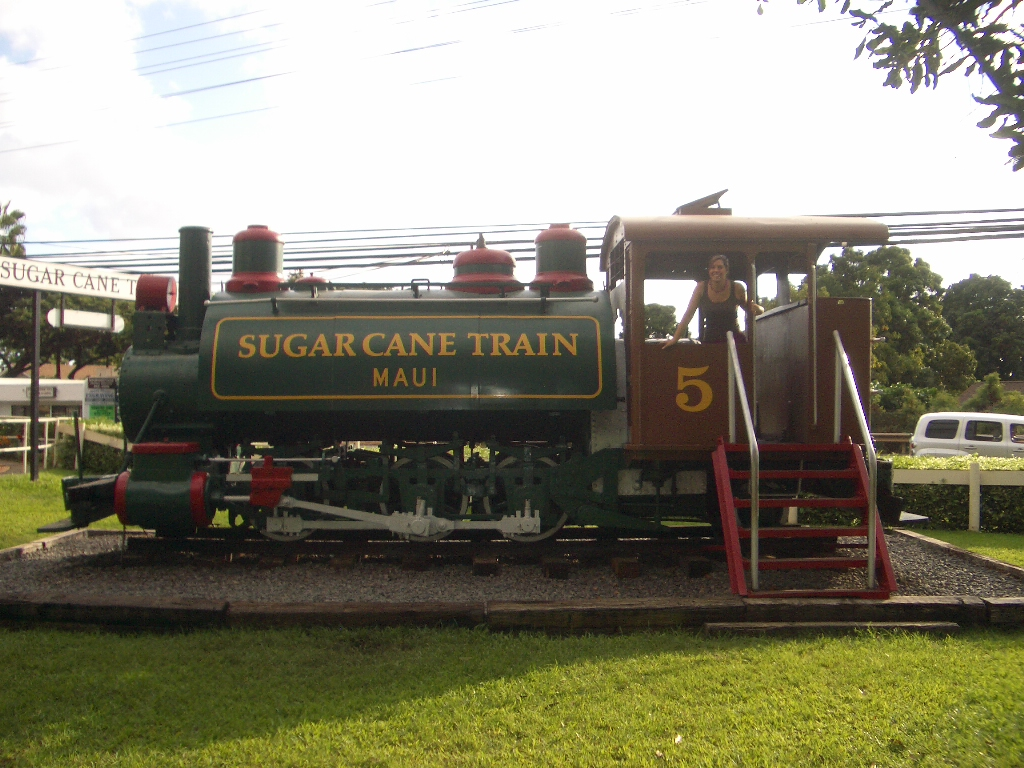
No. 5 at the front of the station

- No. 1 Anaka: a 3 ft (914 mm) narrow gauge 2-4-0 steam locomotive produced by HK Porter of Pittsburgh, Pennsylvania in February 1943 for the Carbon Limestone Company. The engine had undergone extensive exterior modification since it was built by Porter. It was built as a 0-4-0 saddle tank locomotive. In this form, it had a large tank surrounding the boiler, which held water for the locomotive. The LKPRR removed the saddle tanks, added a tender to hold water and fuel, added a larger smokestack, a wooden cab and larger headlight that resembles oil lamps once found on steam locomotives. These changes transformed the engine from a comparatively austere industrial locomotive, into a more lively and colorful engine representative of many small mainline engines once found on railroads throughout the United States in the late 19th century. Scrapped in September 2026.
- No. 3 Myrtle: produced as a brother engine to No. 1, the No. 3 was also a 3 ft (914 mm) narrow gauge 2-4-0 steam locomotive produced by HK Porter of Pittsburgh, Pennsylvania in February 1943 for the Carbon Limestone Company. The LKPRR similarly altered the appearance of this engine, but gave it a slightly more modern appearance, representative of a typical oil-burning engine from the early 20th century. As such, it had a steel cab, whaleback tender, small headlight modeled on an electric prototype, and darker color scheme. The No. 3's design, name and number were inspired by a historic sugarcane engine built in 1900 for the Hawaii Railroad and retired in 1945. Scrapped in September 2026.
- No. 5: a 3 ft (914 mm) narrow gauge outside frame 0-6-2ST locomotive. This engine is not in operating condition, but it is the only steam engine owned by the LKPRR with historical ties to Hawaii. It once ran on the Oahu Railway and Land Company until it was donated in 1954 to the Travel Town Museum in Los Angeles. Through an equipment trade with Travel Town, the LKPRR brought No. 5 back to Hawaii, where it awaited restoration. The engine sustained heavy damage during the 2023 wildfire.
- No. 45 Oahu: a 3 ft (914 mm) narrow gauge MDT Plymouth diesel locomotive from the Oahu Railway & Land Company.

== Points of interest ==
- The Hahakea 325-foot (99 m) wooden trestle
- An operating wooden turntable, used for turning locomotives in Lahaina (destroyed in the Lahaina fire)
- Views of neighboring islands Lanai and Molokai
- Views of the Hale Mahina, also known as the West Maui Mountains
- Blowdown by train yard and trestle

== See also ==
- List of heritage railroads in the United States
