= Oahu Railway and Land Company =

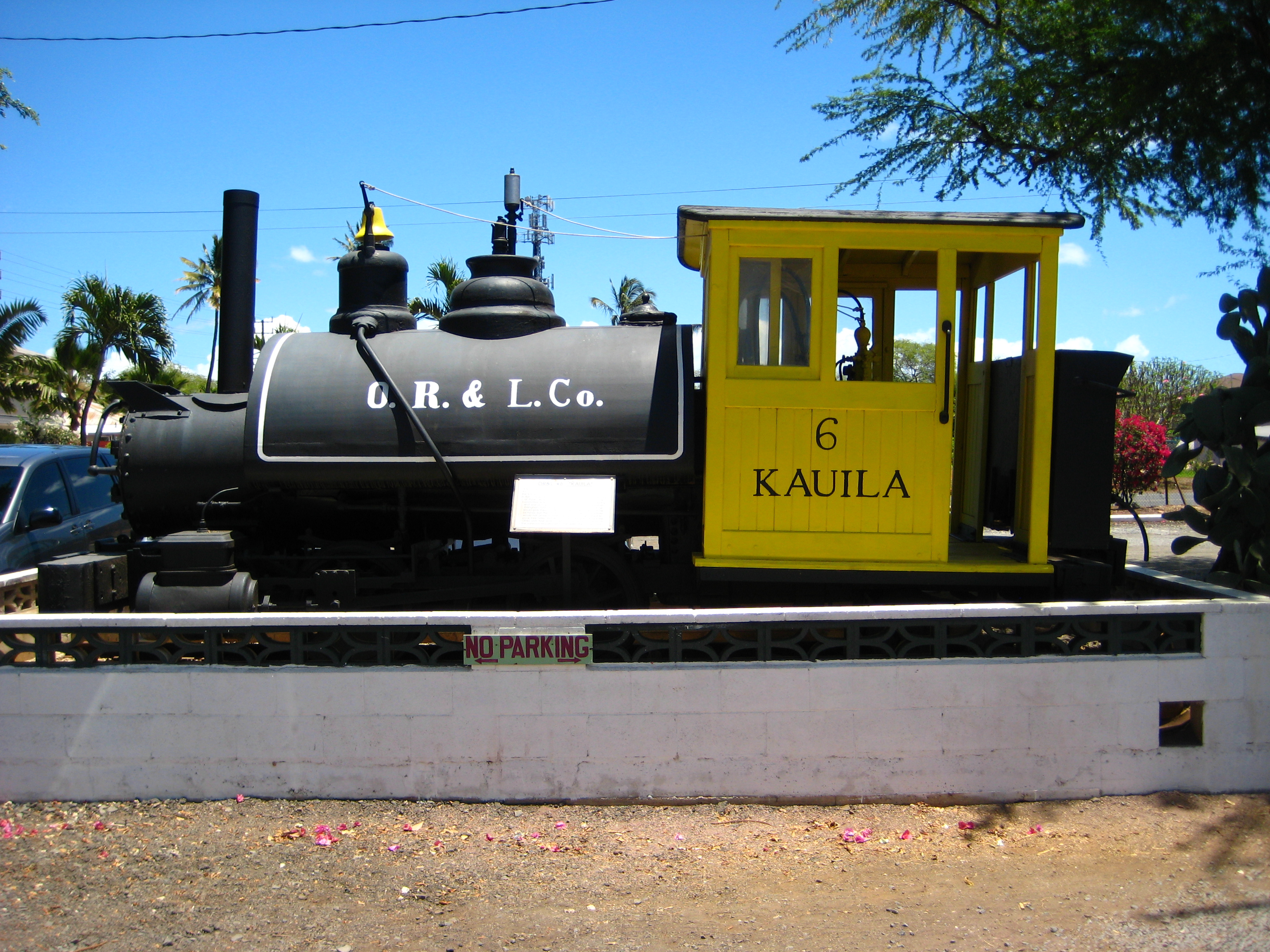
- OR&L No. 6, the Oahu Railway's first locomotive, at the Hawaiian Railway Society

Overview
- Headquarters: Honolulu, Hawaii
- Dates of operation: 1889–1971

Technical
- Track gauge: 3 ft (914 mm)

The Oahu Railway and Land Company, or OR&L, was a 3 ft (914 mm) narrow gauge common carrier railway that served much of the Hawaiian island of Oahu, and was the largest narrow gauge class one common carrier in the U.S., until its dissolution in 1947.

== Origin ==
The OR&L was founded by Benjamin Dillingham, a self-made businessman who arrived in Honolulu as a sailor in 1865. After falling from his horse and breaking his leg while riding in the countryside, Dillingham was forced to stay in Hawaii and recuperate. He decided to make the island kingdom his home. Dillingham had a great deal of business acumen and soon became quite wealthy and influential in the early Honolulu community.

Among his development ideas, he conceived in the 1870s of the arid ʻEwa Plain as an excellent location for human settlement. However, there were two problems: a lack of water and, more significantly, a lack of transportation. A trip from Honolulu to the ʻEwa by horse-drawn wagon was an all-day affair. The key was to build a railroad.

Around the time Dillingham was dreaming of his railroad, another businessman, James Campbell successfully dug ʻEwa's first artesian well in 1879, effectively solving the water problem. Campbell, who had purchased 40,000 acres (16,200 ha) of ʻEwa land thought he might start a cattle ranch, but quickly realized that ʻEwa's rich volcanic soil (which overlays a massive ancient coral reef) combined with year-round sunshine and a supply of water was ideal for growing sugarcane. Within a couple of years sugarcane plantations were sprouting up in this southwestern part of Oahu. The need for transportation between the harbor and ʻEwa was becoming essential.

== Early phase of OR&L ==
While Dillingham's dream of large-scale settlement on the ʻEwa Plain would have to wait until the last decades of the twentieth century, his plan for a railroad to the area came together quickly. He leased Campbell's ʻEwa and Kahuku land to start two sugarcane plantations and obtained a government railroad charter from King David Kalākaua on September 11, 1888. After securing the capital, Dillingham broke ground in March 1889 to connect the 12 miles (19 km) between Honolulu and ʻAiea (as demanded in the charter) by fall 1889. On November 16, 1889, the king's birthday, the OR&L officially opened, giving free rides to more than 4,000 passengers.

By 1892, the line was 18.5 miles (29.8 km) long, reaching ʻEwa sugar mill, home of Dillingham's ʻEwa Plantation Company property. Although progress stalled during the chaos of the late Kingdom and early Republican periods, by 1895 the railroad had passed through what would become the junction of Waipahu, traversed the ʻEwa plain, and was skirting the Waiʻanae coast to a sugar mill there. After issuing gold bonds in January 1897 the company extended the railroad around Oahu's rugged Kaʻena Point to Haleiwa on the north shore by June 1897, where Dillingham built a hotel.

By December 1898, the main line was complete, stretching past Waimea Bay and Sunset Beach to Kahuku and the Kahuku sugar mill past the island's northernmost tip. Although a circle-island line was proposed, it was never seriously considered. In 1906 an 11-mile (18 km) branch line was constructed from Waipahu up the Waikakalua Gulch to Wahiawa and the pineapple fields of central Oahu. The railroad had taken its final shape.

== OR&L to World War I ==
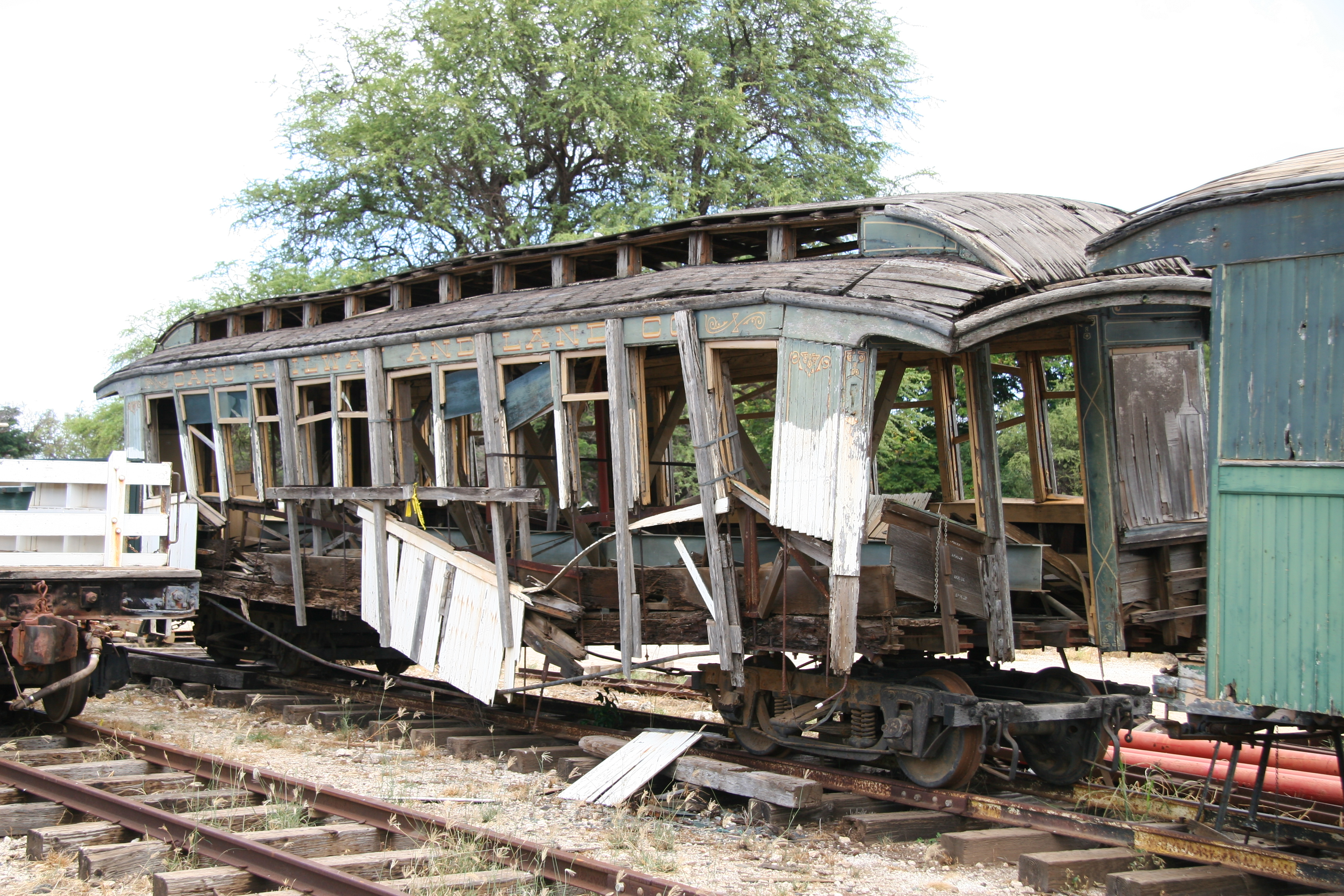
OR&L passenger car coach #2, a first class coach sitting at the Hawaiian Railway Society

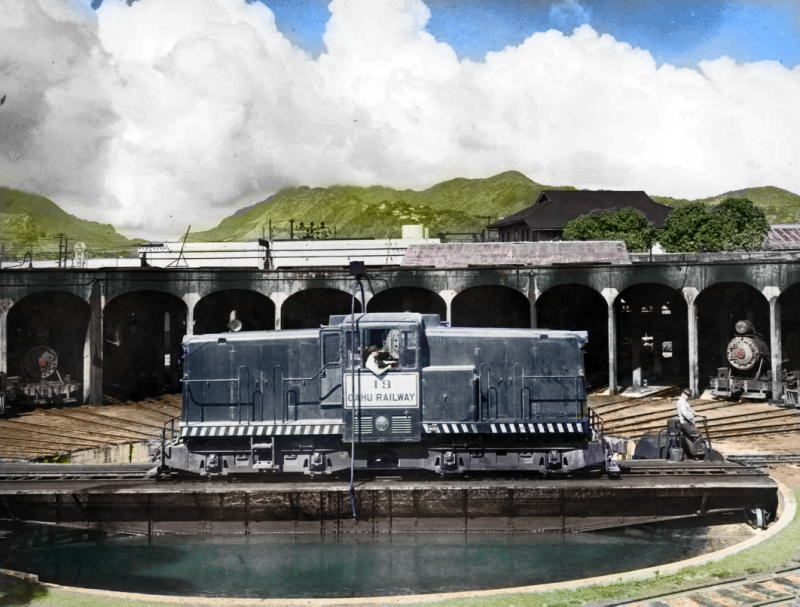
OR&L #19, a 47 tonner GE diesel electric locomotive sits on the Iwilei Turntable in Honolulu. This turntable was electrically operated.

The OR&L was not only a sugarcane railroad. While it served several sugar mills and plantations, it also hauled end products, equipment and workers. The sugarcane plantations sometimes had their own lines. As a common carrier, the OR&L carried freight, passengers, mail and parcels. For instance, besides sugar and pineapples, the railroad hauled garbage from Honolulu to a dump on the Waiʻanae Coast, sand from Waiʻanae to Honolulu during the development of Waikiki, and served the major military bases: Pearl Harbor, Hickam Field, Barber's Point Naval Air Station, Schofield Barracks, and Wheeler Army Airfield.

In 1926, Dillingham built a new passenger terminal designed by Bertram Goodhue, one of the most famous architects in the country, who had also designed the Honolulu Museum of Art and the C. Brewer Building in a Spanish Mission Revival style that matched that of many other public buildings erected during that era. The OR&L train station was converted to a Honolulu Rapid Transit bus terminal after 1947 (later discontinued), and added to the National Register of Historic Places in 1979.

The railroad was profitable, even during the Great Depression, and was a significant mode of communications and transportation until the 1930s. As with railroads in the mainland, private automobiles and public roads led to a decline in traffic, especially passengers. Leading up to World War II the OR&L had all but abandoned its passenger operations, focusing on its profitable freight operations.

== OR&L and World War II ==
World War II was arguably the OR&L's most important period, but would prove to be the company's undoing. After the December 7, 1941 attack on Pearl Harbor, the OR&L became a major player in wartime transportation. The railroad carried out its regular freight operations as well as handling massive amounts of military-related traffic.

The OR&L became the chief transporter of civilian base workers, sailors, soldiers, airmen and marines, both from Honolulu to their bases, or from those bases back to Honolulu for coveted R&R. In 1944 and 1945 the OR&L carried nearly two million riders.

== Postwar finale ==
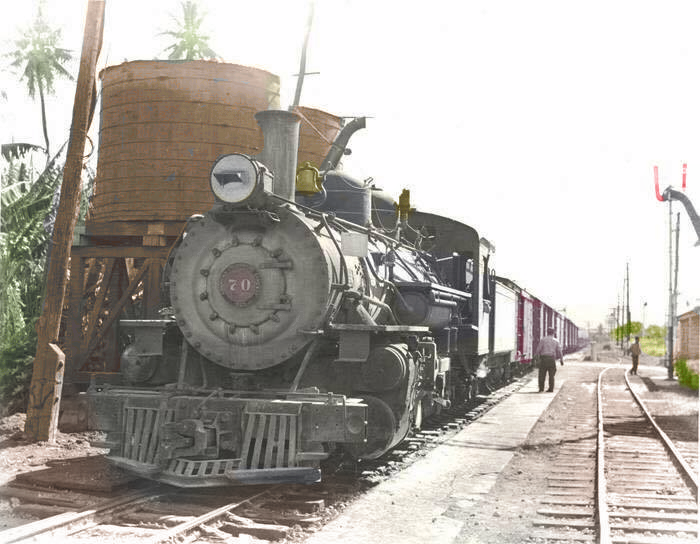
OR&L Mikado #70 stops at Waipahu station for a refill of water. The four mikados on the OR&L were near-identical cousins to the D&RGW K-28 locomotives, albeit oil-burning, slightly shorter tender, different compressor location, and different headlamp.

- Oahu Railway and Land Company; Right-of-Way
- U.S. National Register of Historic Places
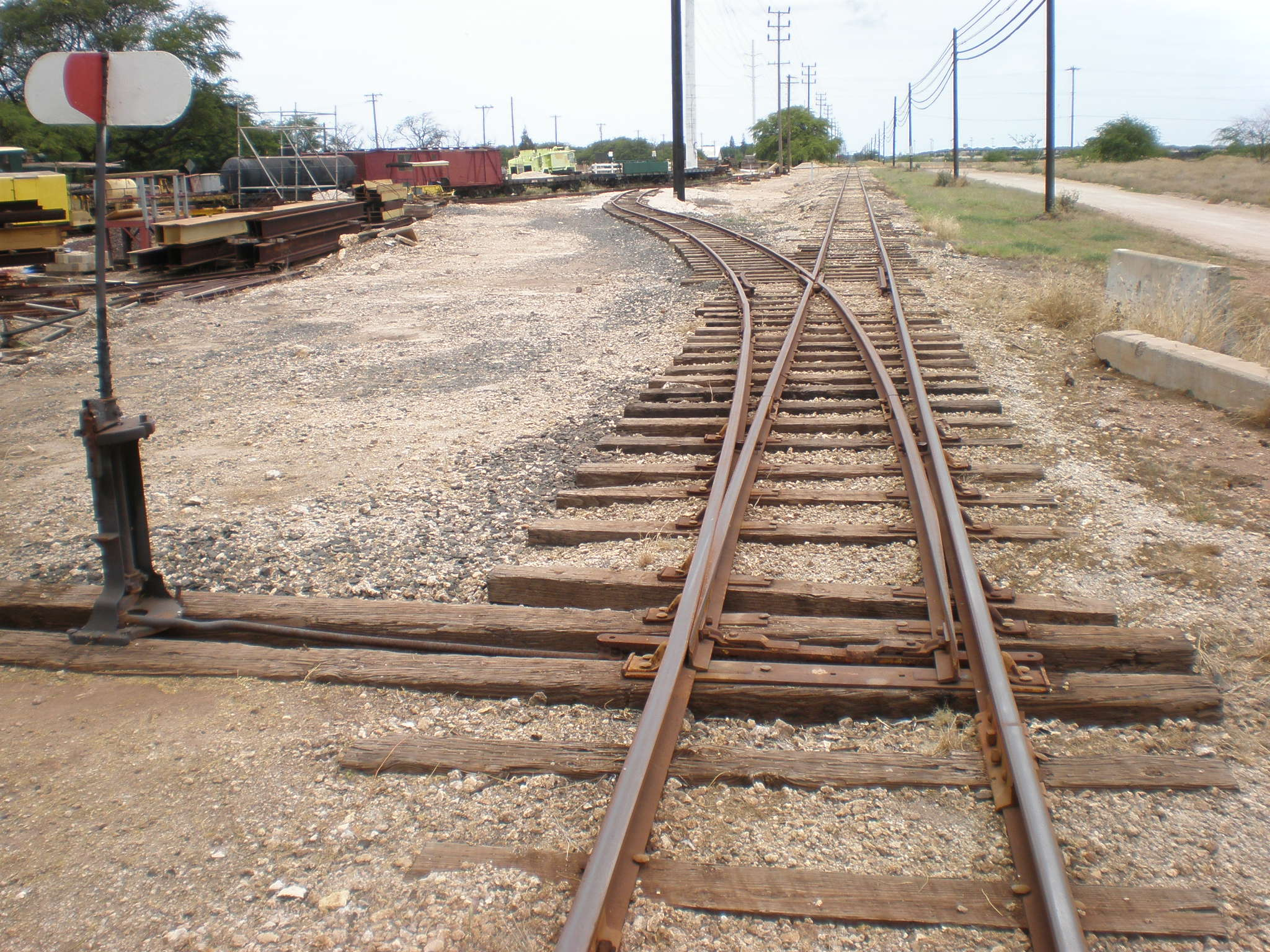
- A portion of the track is preserved

- Location within Oahu
- Nearest city: Nanakuli, Hawaii
- Coordinates: 21°21′14″N 158°1′40″W
- Area: 63 acres (25 ha)
- Built: 1889
- Architectural style: 3 ft (914 mm) narrow gauge railroad track
- NRHP reference No.: 75000621
- Added to NRHP: December 1, 1975

By the end of the war most of the rolling stock, right-of-way, and facilities were worn out. The company's executives pondered whether or not to continue operations. With the end of hostilities wartime traffic dried up. Moreover, Oahu's road network had been upgraded significantly, and thus for the first time there was serious road competition.

The company plugged along for the remainder of 1945 and into 1946 transporting servicemen. Nevertheless, passenger traffic and gross revenues dropped more than fifty percent. The railroad's fate was sealed by the 1946 Aleutian Islands earthquake and the resulting 55-foot (17 m) tsunami that struck on April 1, 1946.

Overlooked by most historians is the fact that from September 1, 1946, through November 18, 1946, 22,000 sugar workers at 33 of Hawaii's 34 sugarcane plantations went on strike. Only the Gay & Robinson Plantation on Kauai remained in operation, as it was non-union privately owned. The strike had a major impact on Hawaii, and OR&L's freight dropped to record lows.

Although the OR&L rebuilt the tracks destroyed by the tsunami and continued operations during the strike, the decision was made to shut down the entire operation at the end of that year. On December 31, 1947, a final excursion carrying company President Walter F. Dillingham (Benjamin Dillingham's son), along with numerous guests, departed from Kahuku behind American Locomotive Company steam engine number 70 through 71.4 miles (114.9 km) of countryside back to the Honolulu station. The OR&L was finished after fifty-eight years. The OR&L replaced its railroad with a truck transport operation.

Most of the system was dismantled in the years following the company's dissolution, although the double-tracked mainline from Honolulu to ʻAiea remained intact until around 1959. Four of the locomotives, 250 freight cars, and a huge quantity of track and supplies were sold to an El Salvadoran railroad in 1950. The Hibiscus & Heliconia Short Line Railroad (H&HSL RR) was formed in 1948 by local rail fans and modelers. Ben Dillingham gave the group a 1st class coach #47 and an observation car #48, formerly the private parlor car named Pearl.

The Kahuku Plantation Co. allowed the group to use their tracks from near Kawela Bay to Punaluu. The group ran excursions infrequently, renting a steam locomotive from Kahuku Plantation. In 1950, the last steam locomotive was retired and the H&HSL RR then used one of two ex-Navy diesels. In 1954, the plantation abandoned its railroad in favor of trucks thus ending the H&HSL RR. Due to a lack of money and enthusiasm the group was unable to remove their two coaches from the property, so a plantation official had them torched.

The OR&L's Honolulu harbor branch, renamed the Oahu Railway, was used until December 31, 1971 for industrial operations. It served a Kalihi stockyard (until 1961), but chiefly hauled incoming Molokai pineapples from the wharves to the Libby, McNeil and Libby and California Packing Corporation (Del Monte) canning plants. The final section of the line was taken over by the US Navy in 1950.

The Navy, especially during the Korean War and the Vietnam War, ran ammunition trains between the West Loch of the Pearl Harbor Naval Base, through the ʻEwa Plain, to the Lualualei Naval Ammunition Depot on the Waiʻanae coast, preserving one of the most famous and scenic stretches of the railroad. The Navy switched to trucks, and the railroad property was abandoned in 1970.

The Oahu Railway & Land Company merged with Hawaiian Dredging to form Dillingham.

== Historic preservation ==
In that same year a small group of railroad fans on Oahu learned of the abandonment and petitioned the Navy to turn the line and equipment over to them. This body became the Hawaiian Railway Society (HRS) in 1970. Nicholas Carter, a charter member of the HRS and one of its founders worked with others in the early 1970s, nominating the former OR&L mainline from ʻEwa to Nānākuli to the National Register of Historic Places. On December 1, 1975, U.S. Senator Hiram Fong reported that this had been done.

Today the tracks are owned by the State of Hawaii, while the HRS is the line's caretaker. The HRS continues to maintain and extend the right-of-way while running excursion trains from its station in ʻEwa. Currently, trains are scheduled for Saturday afternoons at 3:00 and Sunday afternoons at 1:00 and 3:00, running past the new Second City of Kapolei, through the heart of the Koʻolina golf resort, and up the Waiʻanae Coast, presently only as far as Kahe Point. However, the tracks east of Fort Weaver Road have been pulled up, so trains can only operate on the line west of that.

In addition to the ex-Army flat cars used to haul passengers, three cars are at the Hawaiian Railway Society, Coach #2, excursion car #57, and Benjamin Franklin Dillingham's private coach, parlor car #64.

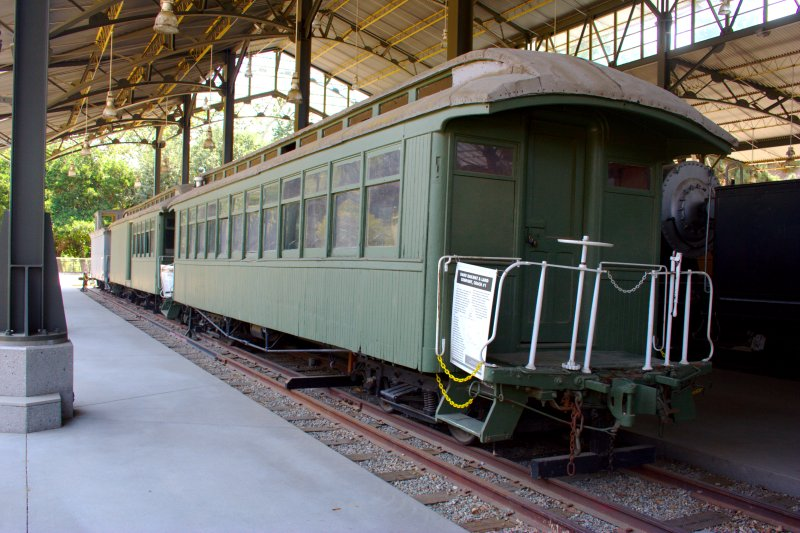
OR&L equipment preserved at Travel Town Museum

Three cars also sit at Travel Town Museum in Griffith Park, California. Coach #1, combination car #36 and caboose #1, all built circa 1900 at the OR&L shops, were donated to the museum by the OR&L in 1953.

Two diesel locomotives, GE 44-ton switchers numbered 15 and 19, remain in regular use on the Cumbres and Toltec Scenic Railroad.

== Bibliography ==
- Best, Gerald M. (1978), Railroads of Hawaii: Narrow and Standard Gauge Common Carriers, Golden West Books
- Chiddix, Jim; Simpson, MacKinnon (2004), Next Stop Honolulu, Honolulu: Sugar Cane Press, ISBN 0-9706213-1-0
- Treiber, Gale E. (2003), Hawaiian Railway Album WWII Photographs, vol. 1, The Railroad Press
- Treiber, Gale E. (2005), Hawaiian Railway Album WWII Photographs, vol. 2, The Railroad Press
