= List of tourist attractions in Greater Orlando =

This is a list of attractions in the Greater Orlando area.

== Attractions ==
The three best-known and most-attended attractions are Walt Disney World, Universal Orlando and SeaWorld Orlando. Others, many on the International Drive corridor, include:

- Andretti Indoor Karting & Games on I-drive near the convention center features multi-level indoor karting, boutique bowling, arcade and prize games, two-story laser tag, virtual-reality racing simulators, a motion theater, and an extreme ropes course.
- Bok Tower Gardens, located in Lake Wales
- Camp Mack's River Resort, located in Lake Wales, Florida
- Central Florida Zoo and Botanical Gardens, located in Sanford along Lake Monroe. This 100-acre (400,000 m^{2}) zoo is home to a butterfly garden, herpetarium, and numerous tropical animals. The zoo originally started as a collection in the Sanford Fire Department, but grew into a regional zoo in 1975. It is currently in the planning stages of expansion and renaming the facility to "Zoo Orlando at Sanford".
- Florida Citrus Tower, a 226-foot-tall (69 m) observation tower in Clermont, Florida
- Fun Spot America Theme Parks. Two amusement parks featuring roller coasters, skycoasters and multi-level go-kart tracks located in Orlando, Florida and in Kissimmee, Florida
- Gatorland houses thousands of alligators and crocodiles. A few of Gatorland's residents have made wrangling appearances in movies, television shows and commercial spots. The park, founded in 1949, combines a petting zoo, bird sanctuary, mini-water park, eco-tour and outdoor entertainment, including daily alligator wrestling.
- Legoland Florida Resort in Winter Haven features the theme park itself, a water park, on-site accommodations, and a separate park based on the animated series Peppa Pig.
- Mary, Queen of the Universe Shrine, a minor basilica located in the theme park area of Orlando
- Medieval Times, in Kissimmee. Six brave knights on horseback compete in tournament games, jousting, and sword fighting while guests dine on a medieval-style banquet.
- The Wheel at ICON Park Orlando A 400-foot-tall (120 m) Ferris wheel that gives visitors a birds eye view of the Orlando Area.
- Pirate's Dinner Adventure
- Ripley's Believe It or Not an attraction museum of over 500 exhibits and artifacts from around the world and throughout time, including over 24 interactive ones.
- WonderWorks with over 100 interactive exhibits
- Sleuths Mystery Dinner Shows a murder mystery dinner theater on International Drive, which also features magic shows and comedy shows on select nights.
- Old Town Orlando offers a small theme park with dining, merchandise, and additional activities.
- Margaritaville Resort Orlando is a complex that includes Island H2O Live! Water Park, the Sunset Walk shopping complex, and other additional events.

== Museums and galleries ==
- The Appleton Awareness Gallery is located at Appleton Creative in downtown Orlando and showcases art exhibits that work to raise awareness and incite action for local causes in the Central Florida area.
- Anita S. Wooten Gallery, a free and open-to-the-public art gallery located in the East Campus of Valencia Community College
- Fort Christmas
- Harry P. Leu Gardens is a 50-acre (200,000 m^{2}) botanical gardens in Winter Park, Florida just north of Orlando, also features the Leu House Museum, furnished to the early 1900s
- Larry E. Smedley National Vietnam War Museum, a Vietnam War museum located in East Orlando.
- Mennello Museum of American Art
- Orange County Regional History Center, a museum about Central Florida history located in Downtown Orlando.
- Orlando Museum of Art
- Orlando Science Center
- Ripley's Believe It or Not! is located on International Drive in a building constructed to appear as if it were collapsing to one side.
- Titanic The Experience, on International Drive, is an interactive museum located on International Drive featuring RMS Titanic artifacts and galleries with dinner shows once a week.
- University of Central Florida Art Gallery is a freeart gallery located at the Visual Arts Building (VAB) at the UCF campus in East Orlando.
- Well'sBuilt Museum of African American History and Culture is located in a historic hotel on South Street, just west of the Amway Center in Downtown Orlando

== Other ==
- B-52 Memorial Park
- Church Street Station, a historic train depot in Downtown Orlando
- SAK Comedy Lab, a 200-seat Improv theater in Downtown Orlando

== Defunct attractions ==
- Arabian Nights Dinner Show, a dinner theater show in Kissimmee, closed at the end of 2013
- Dolly Parton's Dixie Stampede
- King Henry's Feast
- Holy Land Experience closed in February 2020
- Mystery Fun House
- Splendid China closed at the end of 2003
- Xanadu Houses

== See also ==
- List of tourist attractions worldwide
