= Green Meadows Petting Farm =

- Industry: Farming
- Founded: 1964
- Headquarters: United States

Green Meadows Petting Farm is a farm animal learning center company. It was founded by Bob and Coni Keyes in Waterford, Wisconsin in 1964 as a petting farm. In 1988, they moved to Kissimmee, Florida and opened a second operation, notable for featuring a 2 ft (610 mm) narrow gauge railroad for its guests. The locomotive on this railroad was the same model as the locomotive used on the Gatorland Express in nearby Gatorland. The Kissimmee location closed in January 2018.

Members of the Keyes Family have opened eight additional Green Meadows Farms with total attendance of 500,000 people per year.

As of 2018, the family operated in:

- Waterford, Wisconsin (Charlie Keyes)
- Sherwood, Wisconsin (Pat and Bonnie Keyes)
- Hazlet, New Jersey (Tim Keyes)
- Orange, Connecticut (Dan Keyes)
- Bayside, New York (Dan Keyes)
- Floral Park, New York (Dan Keyes)
- Old Bethpage, New York (Dan Keyes)
- Armonk, New York (Dan Keyes)
- Jessup, Maryland (Ken and Gail Keyes)
- Grand Prairie, Texas (Ken and Gail Keyes)
- Naperville, Illinois (Ken and Gail Keyes)
- Frederick, Maryland (Ken and Gail Keyes)

== See also ==
- Central Florida Zoo and Botanical Gardens
