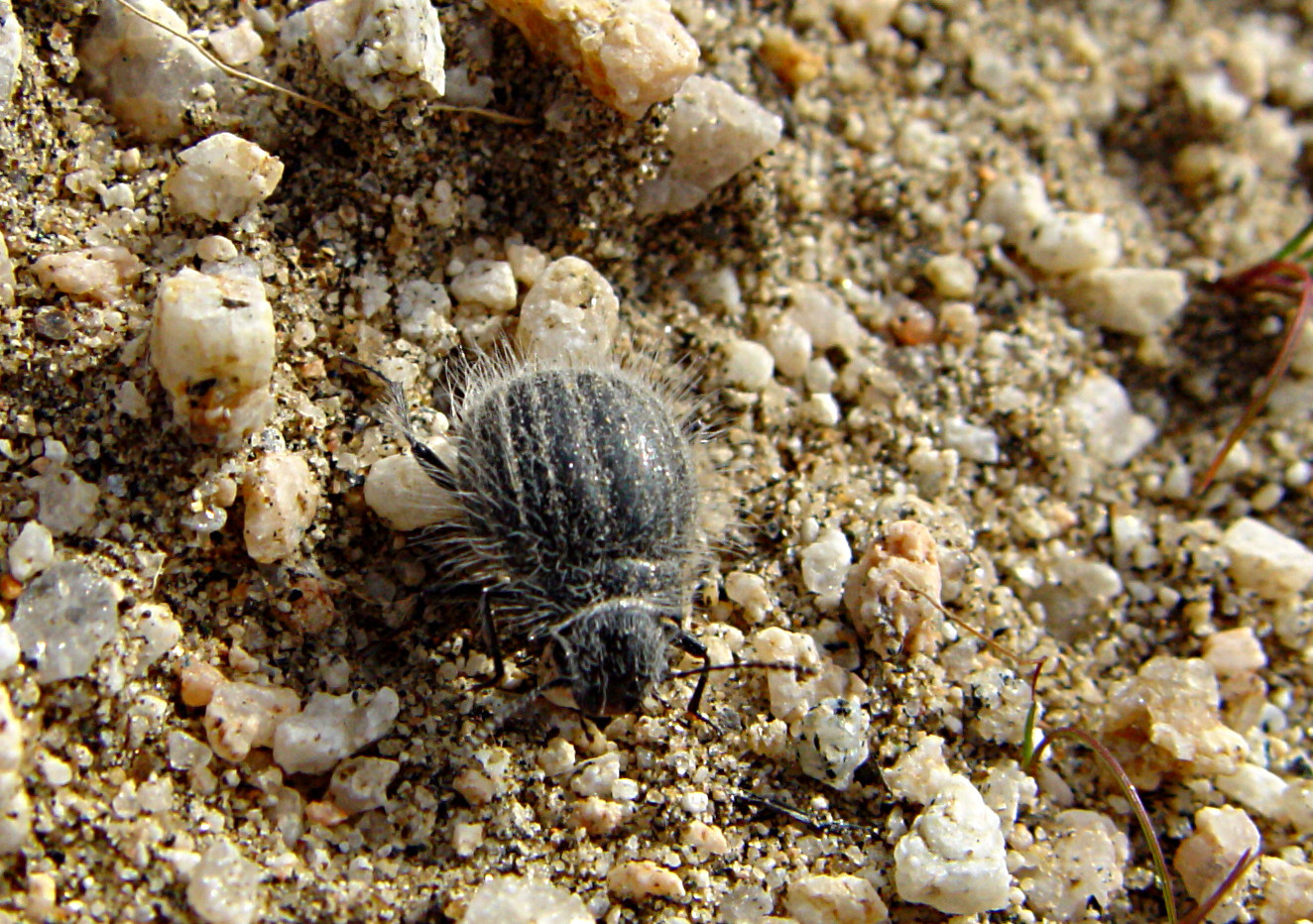
- Edrotes ventricosus, California

Scientific classification
- Domain: Eukaryota
- Kingdom: Animalia
- Phylum: Arthropoda
- Class: Insecta
- Order: Coleoptera
- Suborder: Polyphaga
- Infraorder: Cucujiformia
- Family: Tenebrionidae
- Subfamily: Pimeliinae
- Tribe: Edrotini; Lacordaire, 1859

= Edrotini =

Edrotini is a tribe of darkling beetles in the subfamily Pimeliinae of the family Tenebrionidae. There are more than 50 genera in Edrotini, found primarily in North America and the Neotropics.

== Genera ==
These genera belong to the tribe Edrotini

- Armalia Casey, 1907 (North America and the Neotropics)
- Arthroconus Solier, 1851 (the Neotropics)
- Ascelosodis Redtenbacher, 1868 (the Palearctic and Indomalaya)
- Auchmobius Leconte, 1851 (North America)
- Chilometopon Horn, 1874 (North America)
- Cryptadius Leconte, 1851 (North America)
- Ditaphronotus Casey, 1907 (the Neotropics)
- Edrotes Leconte, 1851 (North America)
- Emmenastrichus Horn, 1894 (North America)
- Emmenides Casey, 1907 (North America)
- Eremocantor Smith & Wirth, 2016 (North America)
- Eschatomoxys Blaisdell, 1935 (North America)
- Eurymetopon Eschscholtz, 1831 (North America)
- Falsoarthroconus Kaszab, 1978 (the Neotropics)
- Garridoa Marcuzzi, 1985 (the Neotropics)
- Hylithus Guérin-Méneville, 1834 (the Neotropics)
- Hylocrinus Casey, 1907 (North America and the Neotropics)
- Kocakia Kaszab, 1985 (the Neotropics)
- Koneus Giraldo-Mendoza & Flores, 2019 (the Neotropics)
- Melanastus Casey, 1907 (North America)
- Mencheres Champion, 1884 (the Neotropics)
- Mesabates Champion, 1884 (North America)
- Mesabatodes Casey, 1907 (North America)
- Metoponium Casey, 1907 (North America)
- Micrarmalia Casey, 1907 (the Neotropics)
- Micromes Casey, 1907 (North America)
- Orthostibia Blaisdell, 1923 (North America)
- Oxygonodera Casey, 1907 (North America)
- Pachacamacius Flores & Giraldo-Mendoza, 2019 (the Neotropics)
- Paraguania Marcuzzi, 1953 (the Neotropics)
- Pescennius Champion, 1884 (North America)
- Pimeliopsis Champion, 1892 (North America)
- Posides Champion, 1884 (North America)
- Prohylithus Kaszab, 1964 (the Neotropics)
- Sechuranus Flores & Giraldo-Mendoza, 2019 (the Neotropics)
- Soemias Champion, 1884 (North America)
- Steriphanides Casey, 1907 (North America)
- Steriphanus Casey, 1907 (North America)
- Stibia Horn, 1870 (North America)
- Stictodera Casey, 1907 (North America)
- Stomion G.R. Waterhouse, 1845 (the Neotropics)
- Telabis Casey, 1890 (North America)
- Telaponium Blaisdell, 1923 (North America)
- Texaponium Thomas, 1984 (North America)
- Tlascalinus Casey, 1907 (North America)
- Trichiotes Casey, 1907 (North America)
- Trientoma Solier, 1835 (the Neotropics)
- Trimytantron Ardoin, 1977 (the Neotropics)
- Trimytis Leconte, 1851 (North America)
- Triorophus Leconte, 1851 (North America)
- Triphalopsis Blaisdell, 1923 (North America)
- Triphalopsoides Doyen, 1990 (the Neotropics)
- Triphalus LeConte, 1866 (North America)
- Troglogeneion Aalbu, 1985 (North America)
- Vizcainyx Aalbu & Smith, 2020 (North America)
