= Asbolus mexicanus =

Scientific classification
- Kingdom: Animalia
- Phylum: Arthropoda
- Class: Insecta
- Order: Coleoptera
- Suborder: Polyphaga
- Infraorder: Cucujiformia
- Family: Tenebrionidae
- Genus: Asbolus
- Species: A. mexicanus

Binomial name
- Asbolus mexicanus (Champion 1884)

Synonyms
- Cryptoglossa mexicana Champion 1884

Species of beetle

Asbolus mexicanus is a species of darkling beetle native to southwestern United States (southern California, to Texas), plus northern Mexico (Baja to Coahuila), where it inhabits dry, sandy zones, or arid scrubby habitats.

== Description ==
Compared to other species in the genus, Asbolus mexicanus was originally differentiated in Champion 1884 (especially from Asbolus laevis LeConte, 1851) by being "opaque, broader, and less convex; the thorax broader, wider in front, flatter and less convex, and the anterior angles more produced the elytra less convex, broader at the base and less rounded at the sides, and with rows of shallow punctures towards the base." (p.73)
