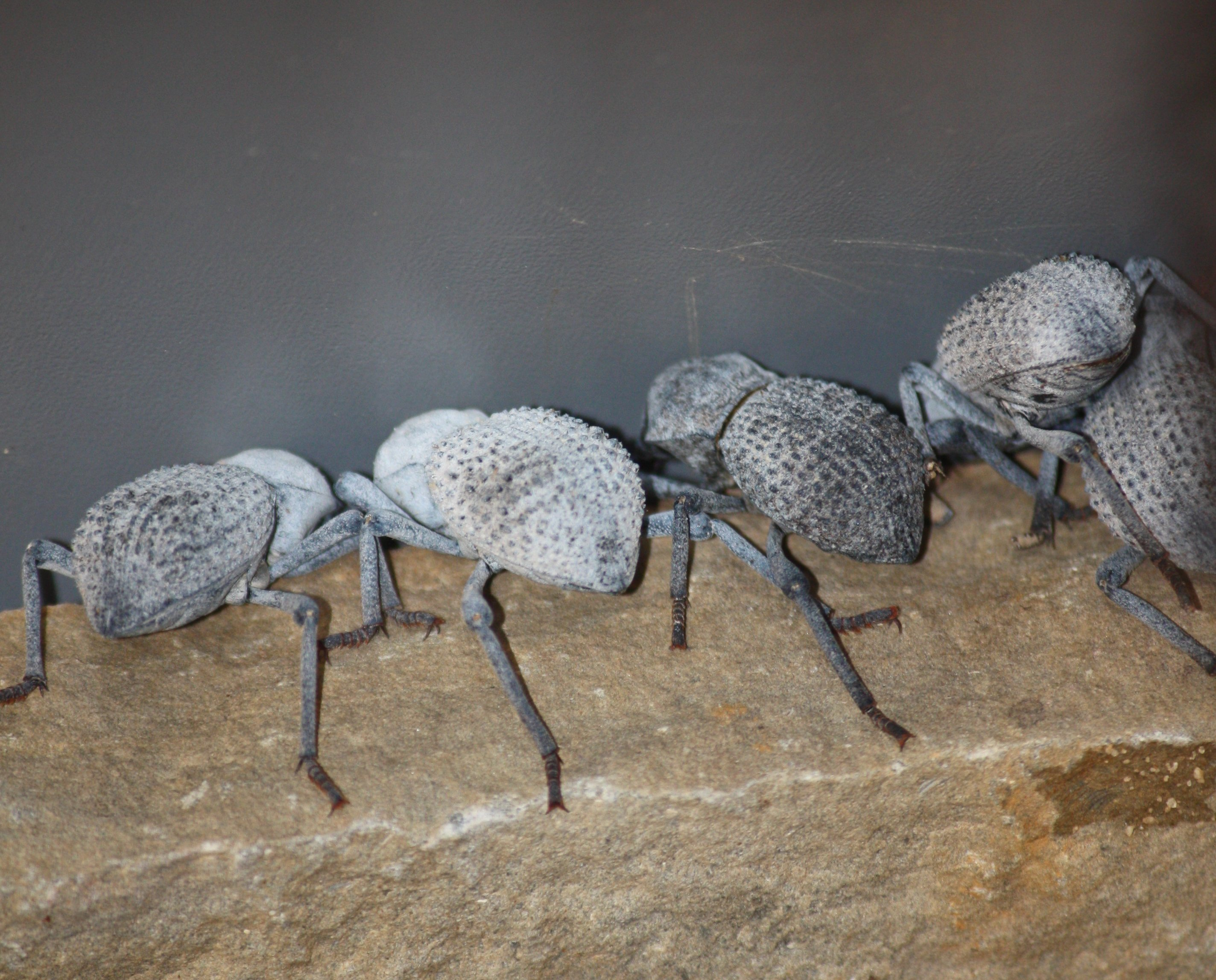
- Asbolus verrucosus, Blue death-feigning beetle

Scientific classification
- Domain: Eukaryota
- Kingdom: Animalia
- Phylum: Arthropoda
- Class: Insecta
- Order: Coleoptera
- Suborder: Polyphaga
- Infraorder: Cucujiformia
- Family: Tenebrionidae
- Subfamily: Pimeliinae
- Tribe: Cryptoglossini; LeConte, 1862

= Cryptoglossini =

Blue Death Feigning Beetle

Cryptoglossini is a tribe of darkling beetles in the subfamily Pimeliinae of the family Tenebrionidae. There are at least three genera in Cryptoglossini, found in North America.

== Genera ==
These genera belong to the tribe Cryptoglossini

- Asbolus LeConte, 1851
- Cryptoglossa Solier, 1837 (death-feigning beetles)
- Schizillus Horn, 1874
