= Asbolus laevis =

Scientific classification
- Kingdom: Animalia
- Phylum: Arthropoda
- Class: Insecta
- Order: Coleoptera
- Suborder: Polyphaga
- Infraorder: Cucujiformia
- Family: Tenebrionidae
- Genus: Asbolus
- Species: A. laevis

Binomial name
- Asbolus laevis LeConte, 1851

Synonyms
- Cryptoglossa laevis (LeConte, 1851)

Species of beetle

Asbolus laevis is a species of darkling beetle native to southwestern United States (southern California, Arizona and northwestern Mexico, where it inhabits dry, sandy habitats such as the Sonoran Desert.

== Description ==
Compared to other species in the genus, Asbolus laevis was originally differentiated in LeConte, 1851 from Asbolus verrucosus by being generally smaller and [translated from Latin] overall "smooth, black, glossy, sparingly finely dotted, and the elytra with dots towards the margins studded with short rough points". (p.130)
