= Margaritaville Resort Orlando =

Complex in Kissimmee, Florida

- Interactive map of Margaritaville Resort Orlando
- Location: Kissimmee, Florida, United States
- Coordinates: 28°20′29″N 81°36′32″W
- Owner: Margaritaville Holdings
- Operated by: Margaritaville Holdings
- Opened: January 15, 2019
- Status: Operating
- Area: 300 acres (120 ha)

Margaritaville Resort Orlando is a 300-acre resort, shopping center, water park, and master-planned residential community located in Kissimmee, Florida, about 4.7 miles (7.6 km) from Disney's Animal Kingdom. The complex opened on January 15, 2019, and is owned and operated by Margaritaville Holdings. A parcel of the southern and eastern property bordering Fins Up Circle, Formosa Gardens Blvd. and Funnie Steed Rd. sits on land previously occupied by the Splendid China theme park, which closed in 2003.

== History ==
In 1993, the Splendid China theme park was opened as a sister park to Splendid China Folk Village located in Shenzhen, Guangdong province, People's Republic of China. The park closed in 2003 after struggling to attract visitors and make a profit for years. The 75 acre park sat abandoned until 2013, when the owners demolished the entire property. In August 2015, Encore Homes reported that Margaritaville Resort would open on the former Splendid China site, with resort homes, condos and timeshares in a Jimmy Buffett themed setting. In March 2016, construction began on Margaritaville Resort Orlando.

== Areas ==
=== Margaritaville Hotel ===
The $90 million, 187-room Margaritaville Hotel is located at the entrance of the resort. The hotel features multiple suites a fitness center, spa, kids club, 3-acre resort-style swimming area, trolley service around the resort, and complimentary shuttles to nearby Orlando theme parks.

=== Island H2O Live! ===
Island H2O Live! is a 12-acre, $40 million water park located within the resort. The water park is the first of its kind, being focused around social media. Guests have the ability to sync their wristband to the park's app to capture photos and videos throughout their day, control the streaming playlist for the park-wide music, and interact with games and other experiences to win food and other prizes. The water park features 14 attractions, 3 food and beverage locations, and one merchandise location.

=== Sunset Walk ===
Sunset Walk is a 200,000 square foot shopping center located near the entrance of the resort featuring 24 shops and restaurants.

=== Residential ===
1,000 residential units consisting of cottages, vacation homes, condos, and timeshare units are planned for the property ranging from one to eight bedrooms.
