= Asbolus papillosus =

Scientific classification
- Kingdom: Animalia
- Phylum: Arthropoda
- Class: Insecta
- Order: Coleoptera
- Suborder: Polyphaga
- Infraorder: Cucujiformia
- Family: Tenebrionidae
- Genus: Asbolus
- Species: A. papillosus

Binomial name
- Asbolus papillosus (Triplehorn, 1964)

Species of beetle

Asbolus papillosus is a species of darkling beetle native to southwestern United States (southern California and northwestern Mexico, where it inhabits dry, sandy habitats such as the Sonoran Desert.

== Description ==
Compared to other species in the genus, Asbolus papillosus may be characterized by having more granular elytra (=hardened forewings) and shorter hairs on its tarsi.
