= Jawlene =

American alligator with a missing upper jaw

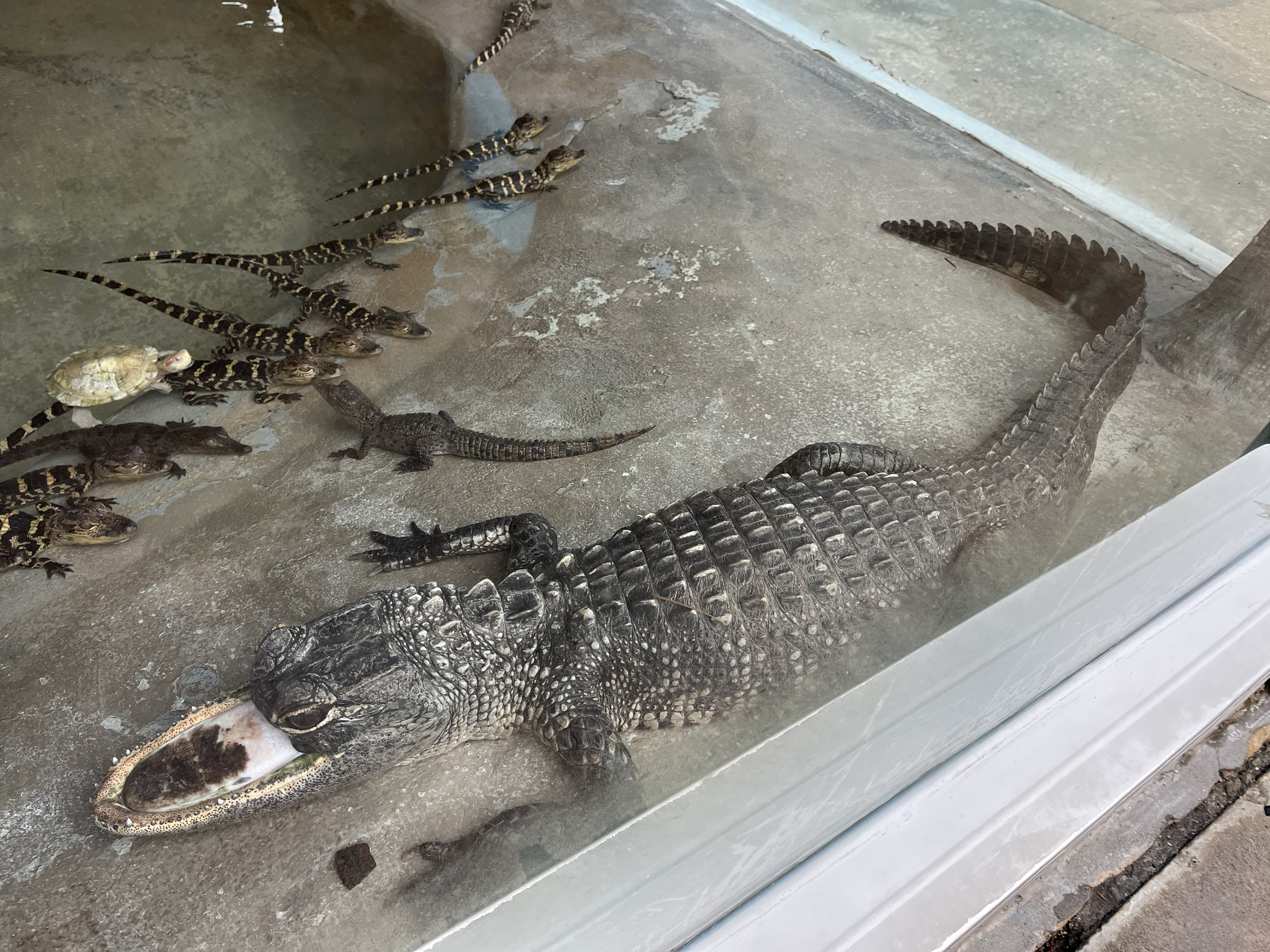
- Jawlene at Gatorland
- Species: American alligator
- Sex: Female

Jawlene is a female American alligator (Alligator mississippiensis) living at Gatorland in Orlando, Florida. She is notable for having lost most of her upper jaw. Despite the severity of her injury, Jawlene has survived for years and has become one of Gatorland's most recognized animals.

== Background ==
Jawlene is believed to have lost her upper jaw due to trauma sustained in the wild, possibly from a boat propeller, entanglement in fishing line, or a fight with another American alligator. Such injuries are uncommon but survivable in alligators due to their slow metabolism, strong immune systems, and ability to adapt feeding behaviors.

The alligator was later captured in mid September 2023 and transferred to Gatorland, where she now lives under permanent human care.

== Injury and survival ==
Jawlene's injury involves the near-complete loss of her upper snout, leaving exposed tissue and teeth. Despite this, she is able to eat using modified feeding techniques, primarily relying on gravity and assistance from caretakers. Gatorland staff provide her with specialized feeding and veterinary monitoring.

== Name ==
The name "Jawlene" is a play on the name "Jolene" and references the alligator's missing jaw. She was named that after a number of submissions, and the staff chose it since it represented southern culture since the music artist Dolly Parton was from the American South.

== See also ==
- Gatorland
- American alligator
