= Metoponium =

Scientific classification
- Kingdom: Animalia
- Phylum: Arthropoda
- Class: Insecta
- Order: Coleoptera
- Suborder: Polyphaga
- Infraorder: Cucujiformia
- Family: Tenebrionidae
- Tribe: Edrotini
- Genus: Metoponium; Casey, 1907

Genus of beetles

Metoponium is a North American genus of darkling beetles.

== Description ==
Metoponium is one of several darkling beetle genera to have the ends of the protibia expanded dorsally. It can be distinguished from related genera by the epistomal lobe (front edge of the head) being slightly concave and the presence of distinct carinae over the eyes.

== Ecology ==
Beetles of this genus have been found to damage crops such as tomato and watermelon.

== Species ==
This genus comprises the two subgenera Metoponiopsis and Metoponium. Below are the described species as of 2018:

Metoponiopsis

- Metoponium bicolor (Horn, 1870) - USA (AZ CA), MEX (BC)

Metoponium

- Metoponium abnorme abnorme (LeConte, 1851) - USA (CA)
- Metoponium abnorme faustum Casey, 1907 - USA (CA)
- Metoponium abnorme laticolle Casey, 1907 - USA (AZ ), MEX (BC BS)
- Metoponium angelicum Blaisdell, 1923 - MEX (BC)
- Metoponium arizonicum Casey, 1907 - USA (AZ)
- Metoponium candidum Casey, 1907 - USA (AZ ), MEX (SO)
- Metoponium cognitum Casey, 1907 - USA (TX)
- Metoponium concors Casey, 1907 - USA (CA)
- Metoponium congener (Casey, 1890) - USA (TX)
- Metoponium convexicolle (LeConte, 1851) - USA (AZ CA NV ), MEX (BC BS)
- Metoponium crassum Casey, 1907 - USA (AZ)
- Metoponium cribriceps Casey, 1907 - USA (NM TX)
- Metoponium cylindricum (Casey, 1890) - USA (CA)
- Metoponium dubium (Casey, 1884) - USA (AZ)
- Metoponium edax Casey, 1907 - USA (CA)
- Metoponium egregium Casey, 1907 - USA (CA)
- Metoponium emarginatum (Casey, 1884) - USA (AZ)
- Metoponium erosum Blaisdell, 1943 - MEX (BS)
- Metoponium extensum Casey, 1907 - USA (AZ)
- Metoponium fatigans Casey, 1907 - USA (AZ)
- Metoponium fusculum (Casey, 1890) - USA (AZ CA)
- Metoponium gravidum Casey, 1907 - USA (CA)
- Metoponium gulosum Casey, 1907 - USA (CA)
- Metoponium hebes Casey, 1907 - USA (AZ)
- Metoponium insulare Casey, 1907 - USA (CA)
- Metoponium integer Casey, 1907 - USA (CA)
- Metoponium ludificans Casey, 1907 - USA (TX)
- Metoponium molestum Casey, 1907 - USA (CA)
- Metoponium nevadense Casey, 1907 - USA (NV)
- Metoponium opacipenne Casey, 1907 - USA (CA)
- Metoponium pacificum Blaisdell, 1923 - MEX (BS)
- Metoponium pallescens Casey, 1907 - USA (AZ)
- Metoponium parvuliceps Casey, 1907 - USA (AZ)
- Metoponium perforatum anceps Casey, 1907 - USA (NM)
- Metoponium perforatum congruens Casey, 1907 - USA (NM)
- Metoponium perforatum perforatum (Casey, 1890) - USA (AZ)
- Metoponium phoenicis Casey, 1907 - USA (AZ)
- Metoponium politum (Casey, 1890) - USA (TX)
- Metoponium probatum Casey, 1907 - USA (CA)
- Metoponium procerum Casey, 1907 - USA (AZ)
- Metoponium prolixum Casey, 1907 - USA (AZ)
- Metoponium rufescens Casey, 1907 - USA (AZ)
- Metoponium rufopiceum Casey, 1907 - USA (AZ)
- Metoponium saginatum Casey, 1907 - USA (TX)
- Metoponium socium socium Casey, 1907 - USA (AZ)
- Metoponium socium subsimile Casey, 1907 - USA (AZ)
- Metoponium subovale Casey, 1907 - USA (UT)
- Metoponium tersum Casey, 1907 - USA (CA)
- Metoponium testaceum Casey, 1907 - USA (CA)
- Metoponium transversum Blaisdell, 1943 - MEX (BS)
- Metoponium truncaticeps Casey, 1907 - USA (AZ)

== Identification ==
The genus was first described by Thomas Lincoln Casey Jr. in 1907, who included a key to this genus and a key to the species known at the time.
