= Central Florida Zoo and Botanical Gardens =

Zoo and botanical garden in Sanford, Florida, United States

Central Florida Zoo & Botanical Gardens
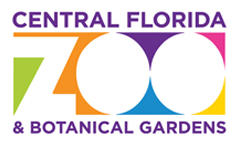

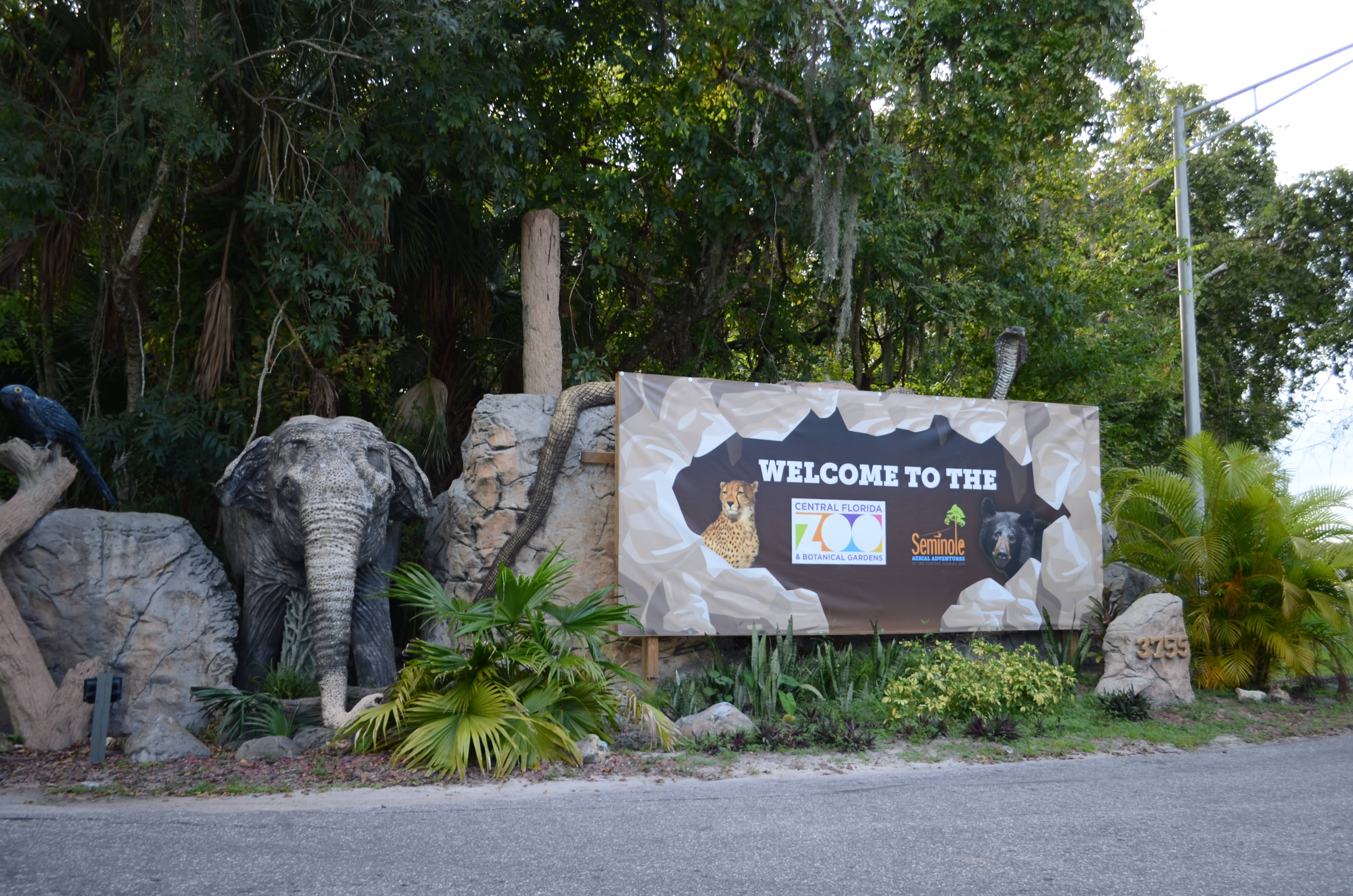
- Entrance to the Central Florida Zoo
- Interactive map of Central Florida Zoo & Botanical Gardens
- 28.827832°N 81.31623°W
- Date opened: 1923; July 4, 1975 in current location
- Location: Sanford, Florida, United States
- Land area: 116 acres (47 ha)
- No. of animals: 400
- Annual visitors: 300,000
- Memberships: AZA
- Website: www.centralfloridazoo.org

The Central Florida Zoo and Botanical Gardens is a 116-acre (47 ha) zoo and botanical garden located north of Orlando, Florida in Sanford. As a not-for-profit organization, it is a leader in conservation, providing experiences that inspire actions on behalf of wildlife. The Zoo has been an accredited member of the Association of Zoos and Aquariums (AZA) since 1986.

== History ==
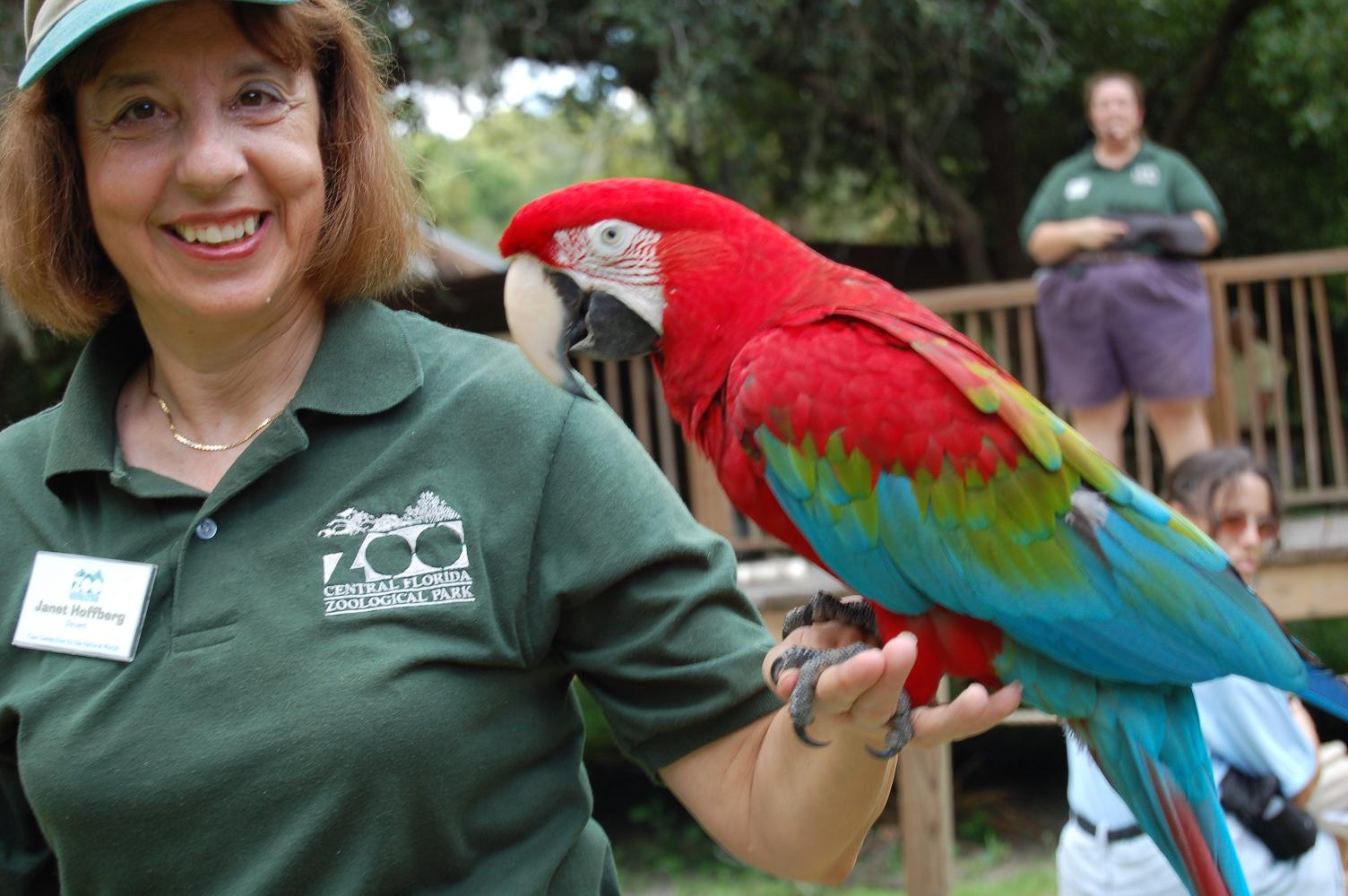
Green-winged macaw with zookeeper

In 1923, the Central Florida Zoo (then called the Sanford Municipal Zoo) opened its gates for the first time with only a small collection of animals that were donated by the local fire department. In 1941, it was relocated to new facilities where Sanford City Hall now stands. It was moved to its current location on July 4, 1975.

With the support from a group of dedicated citizens, and the donation of a 106-acre piece of land from Seminole County, the Central Florida Zoological Park opened at its current location along Lake Monroe, with Jack Hanna as Director. In 1986 the Central Florida Zoo became accredited by the Association of Zoos and Aquariums (AZA). In 2005, The Wayne M. Densch Discovery Center and ZooLab opened. The buildings feature classroom and hands-on instructional space, as well as a multi-purpose banquet room available for private meeting and event rentals. In 2007, the Zoo officially announced its botanical garden status and became the Central Florida Zoo and Botanical Gardens. The same year, the Wharton-Smith Tropical Splash Ground opened.

In 2022, the zoo closed for over 3 weeks due to Hurricane Ian.

== Animals ==
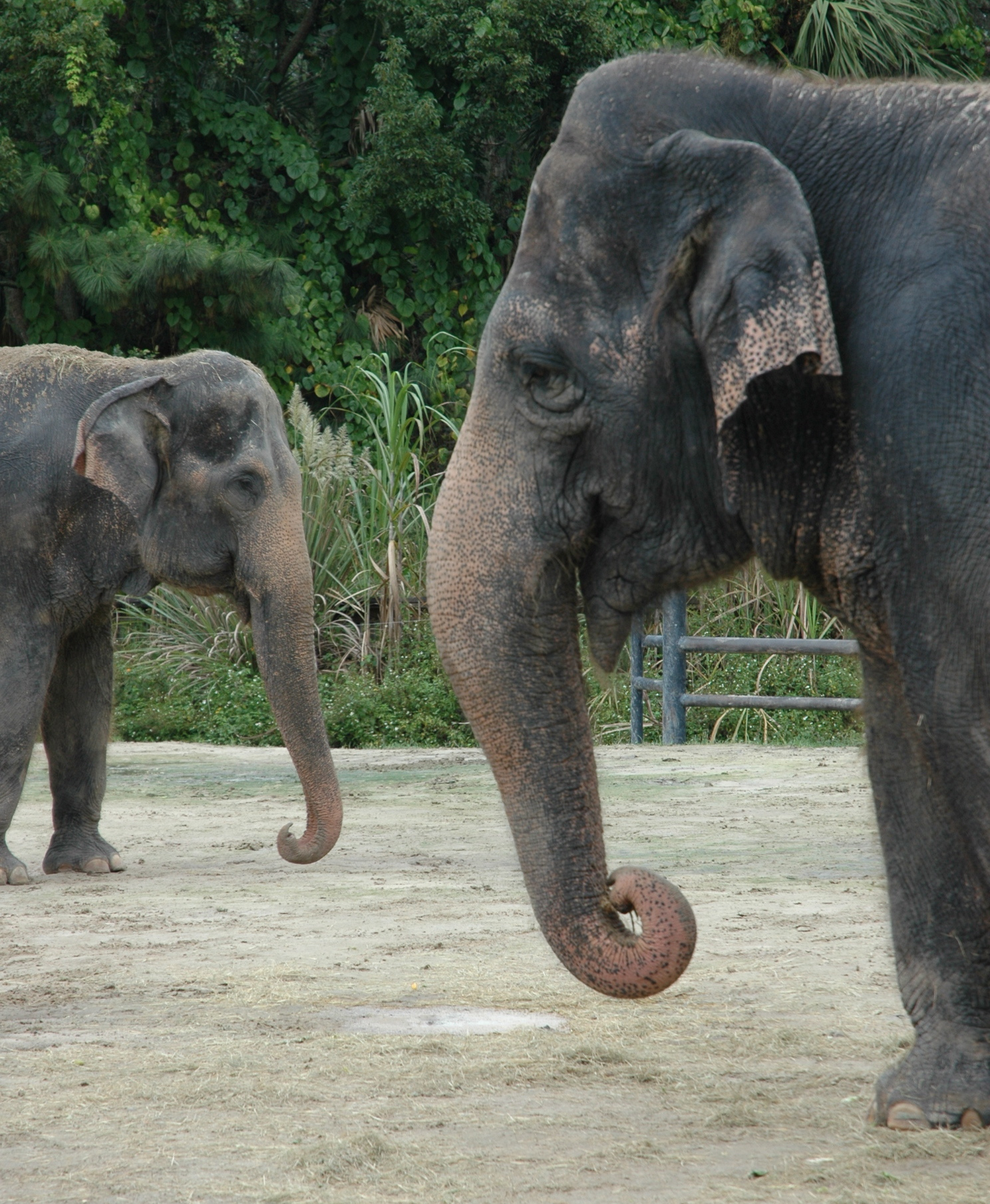
Asian Elephants at the zoo

The zoo is home to around 400 individual animals, closely representing 100 species. While visiting, guests can take advantage of educational opportunities including keeper chats and animal encounters.

List of animals

Mammals

- American black bear
- Amur leopard
- Blue duiker
- Cape porcupine
- Chacoan peccary
- Cheetah
- Cotton-top tamarin
- Domestic goat
- Domestic sheep
- Fossa (animal)
- Guianan squirrel monkey
- Geoffroy's spider monkey
- Indian rhinoceros
- Lesser spot-nosed guenon
- Linnaeus's two-toed sloth
- Llama
- Masai giraffe
- Mongoose lemur
- North American river otter
- Ring-tailed lemur

Birds

- African pygmy goose
- Bald eagle
- Blue-and-gold macaw
- Cape thick-knee
- Crested coua
- Domestic chicken
- Guira cuckoo
- Green-winged macaw
- Hyacinth macaw
- Laughing kookaburra
- Nicobar pigeon
- Palawan peacock-pheasant
- Red-shouldered hawk
- Red-tailed hawk
- Silvery-cheeked hornbill
- Violet turaco
- Wreathed hornbill

Reptiles

- American alligator
- American crocodile
- African spurred tortoise
- Aldabra giant tortoise
- Aruba island rattlesnake
- Baja blue rock lizard
- Blue iguana
- Black-breasted leaf turtle
- Crocodile monitor
- Desert horned viper
- Dusky pygmy rattlesnake
- Eastern diamondback rattlesnake
- Eastern indigo snake
- Emerald tree boa
- Eyelash viper
- Florida cottonmouth
- Gaboon viper
- Green bush viper
- Green tree python
- Henkel's leaf-tailed gecko
- Jamaican boa
- Leopard tortoise
- Mexican lance-headed rattlesnake
- Metlapilcoatlus mexicanus
- Naja haje
- New Caledonian giant gecko
- Orinoco crocodile
- Pantherophis obsoletus
- Prehensile-tailed skink
- Radiated tortoise
- Bitis rhinoceros
- Snouted cobra
- Southern copperhead
- Spotted turtle
- Sri Lankan pit viper
- Tokay gecko
- Western green mamba

Amphibians

- Amazonian milk frog
- Australian green tree frog
- Dendrobates auratus
- Dendrobates leucomelas

Invertebrates

- Acanthoscurria geniculata
- Asbolus verrucosus
- Avicularia geroldi
- Blaberus discoidalis
- Brachypelma albopilosum
- Dermestidae sp.
- Gerridae sp.
- Giant African Millipede
- Hadogenes troglodytes
- Poecilotheria subfusca
- Porcellio laevis

== Attractions ==
Within the zoo, a splash park can be found. Giraffe feedings and rhino encounters are available for an extra cost. The Little Florida Railroad, a 16 in (406 mm) gauge ridable miniature railway with a G-16 streamliner locomotive originally built in 1951, began operating at the zoo in 2003. Following an incident in November 2019 in which a derailment required guests to be hospitalized, the train was closed temporarily. In early 2023, the zoo unveiled its new train.

== Events ==
The Zoo hosts several annual events, including ZOO Boo Bash and Hippity Hop Adventure. Brews Around the Zoo, a 21 & up only event occurs yearly in the spring. In 2019, the Inaugural Asian Lantern Festival: Into the Wild, was held at the Central Florida Zoo. In partnership with Tianyu Arts & Culture, 35 hand crafted illuminated lantern elements transformed the Zoo and more than 38,000 guests took part in the event.

== Conservation ==
The Central Florida Zoo has teamed up with The Florida Fish and Wildlife Conservation Commission's Fish and Wildlife Research Institute (FWC/FWRI) and the Florida Museum of Natural History to monitor the state's 68 species of amphibians and help save the 16 species considered to be at greatest risk due to habitat loss, invasive species, climate change, and new wildlife diseases. The Zoo also participates in several AZA Species Survival Plans (SSP), including those for the Indian rhino, cheetah, Amur leopard, cotton-top tamarin, and blue iguana.

The Zoo also operates an offsite conservation center, the Orianne Center for Indigo Conservation. This facility helps to breed and release eastern indigo snakes into the wild where they have disappeared.

== Gallery ==
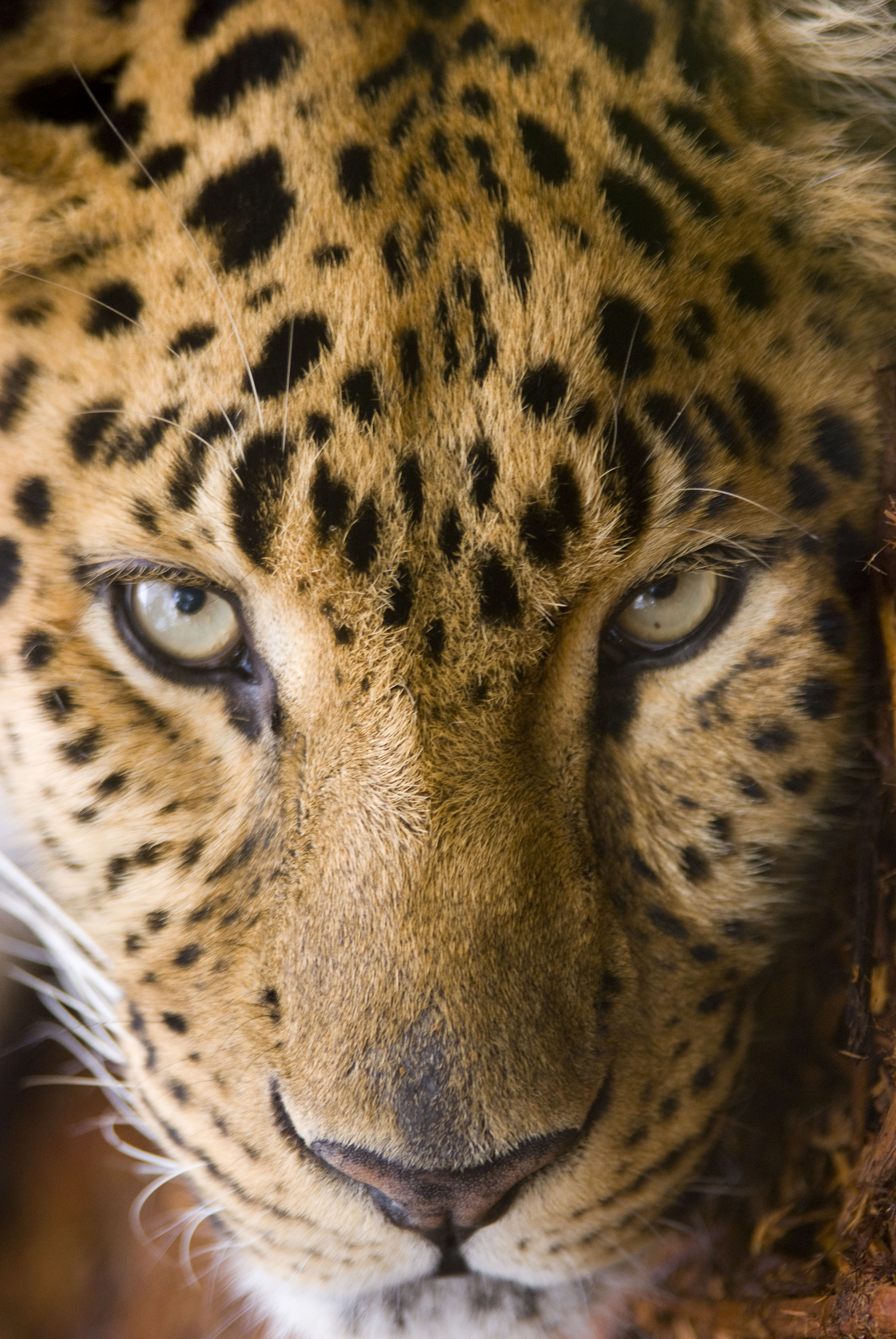
Amur leopard (Panthera pardus orientalis)

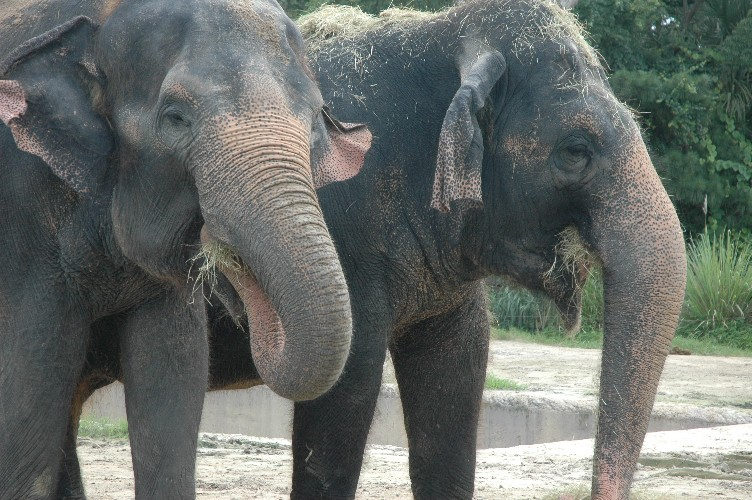
Asian elephants (Elephas maximus)

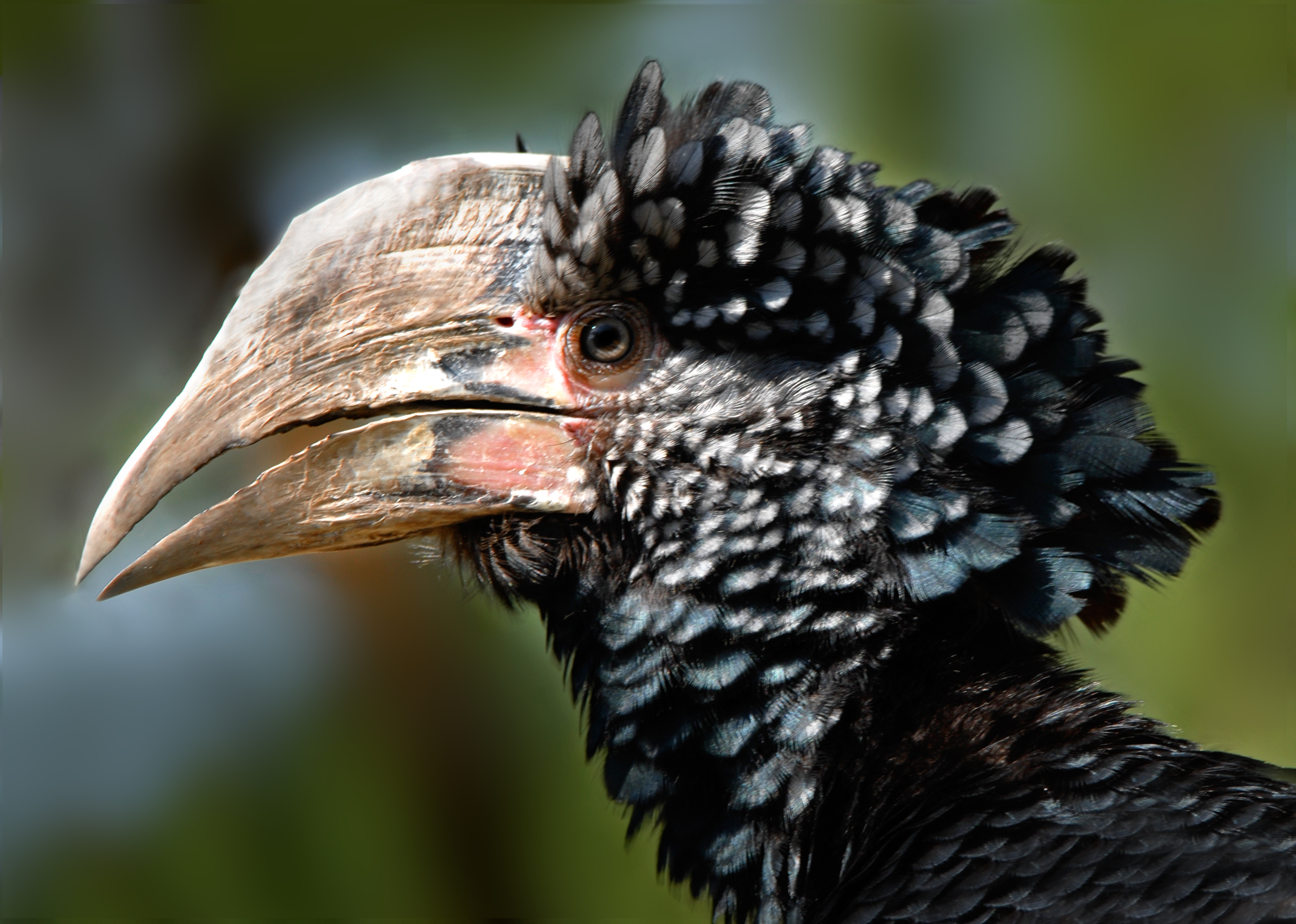
Hornbill (Bucerotidae)

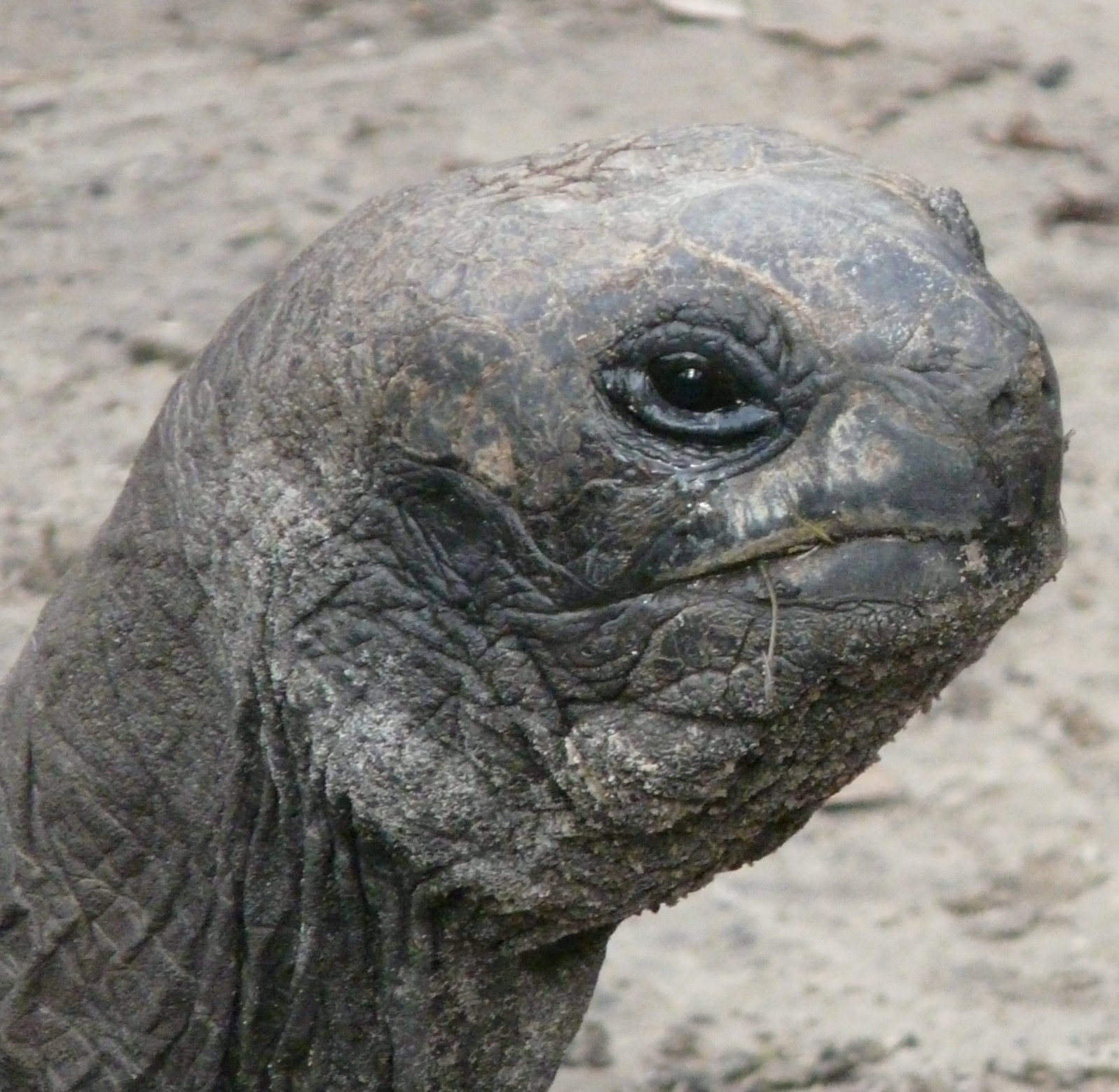
Aldabra giant tortoise (Aldabrachelys gigantea)

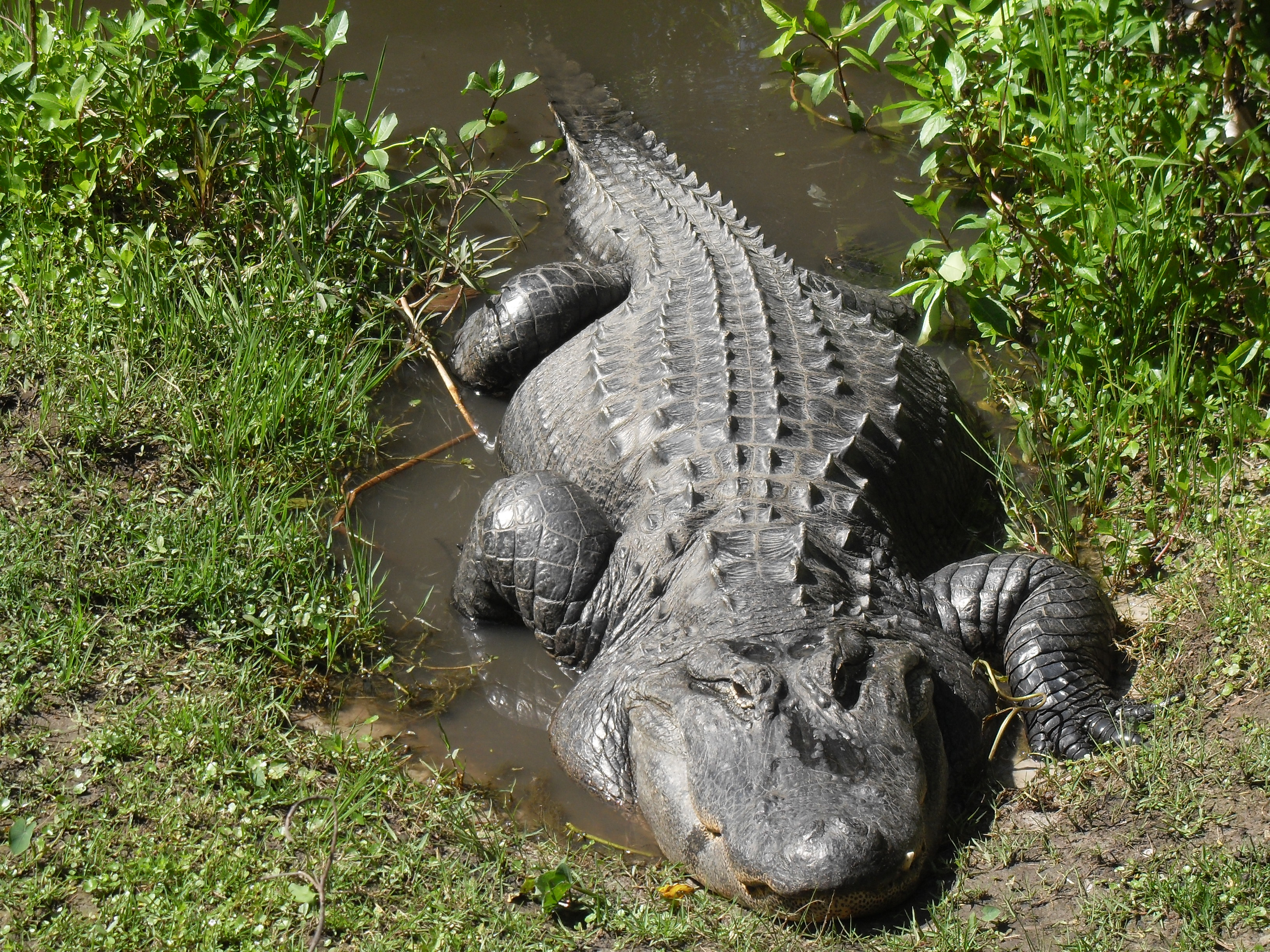
American alligator (Alligator mississippiensis)

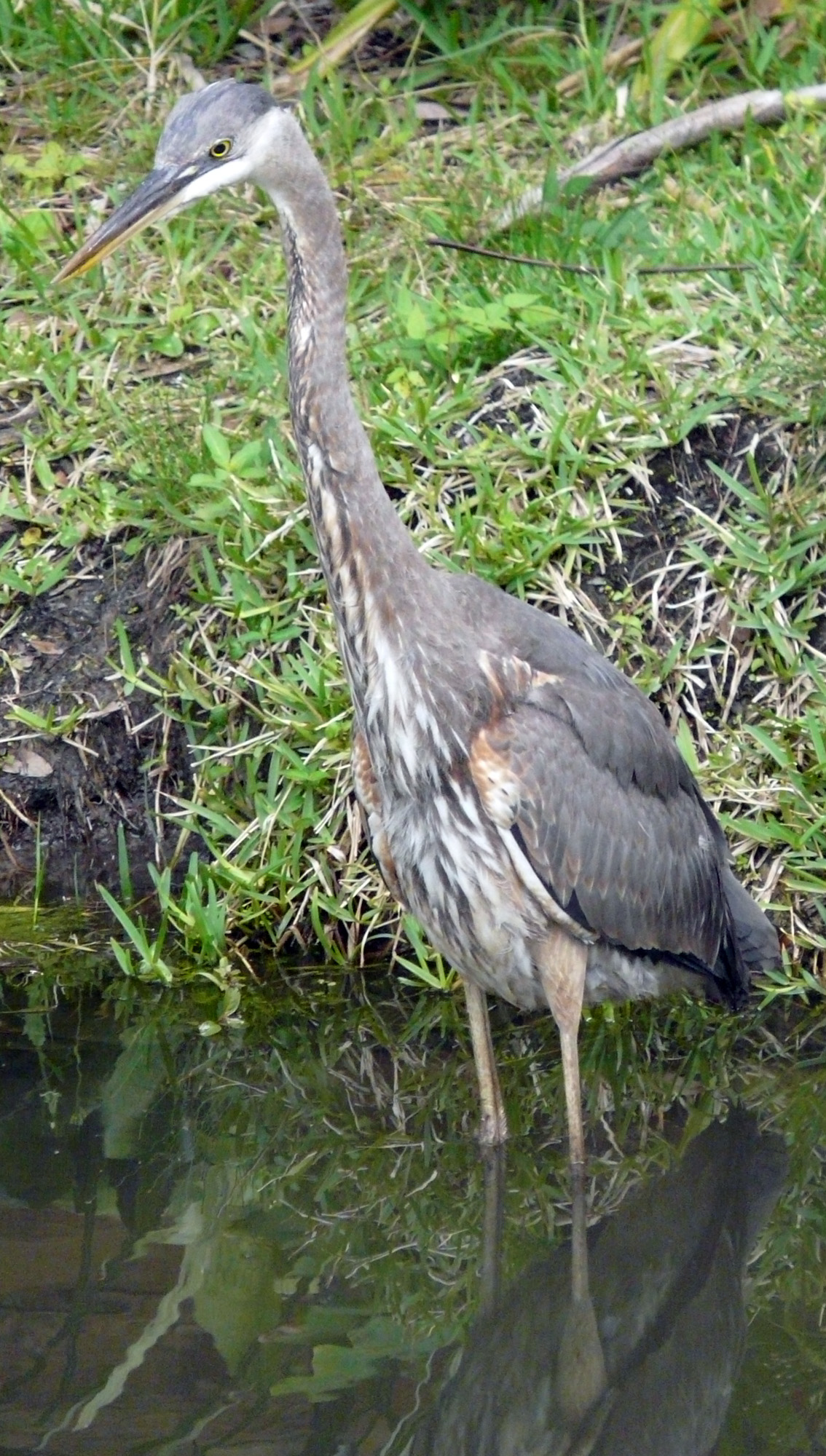
Blue heron

== See also ==
- Gatorland
