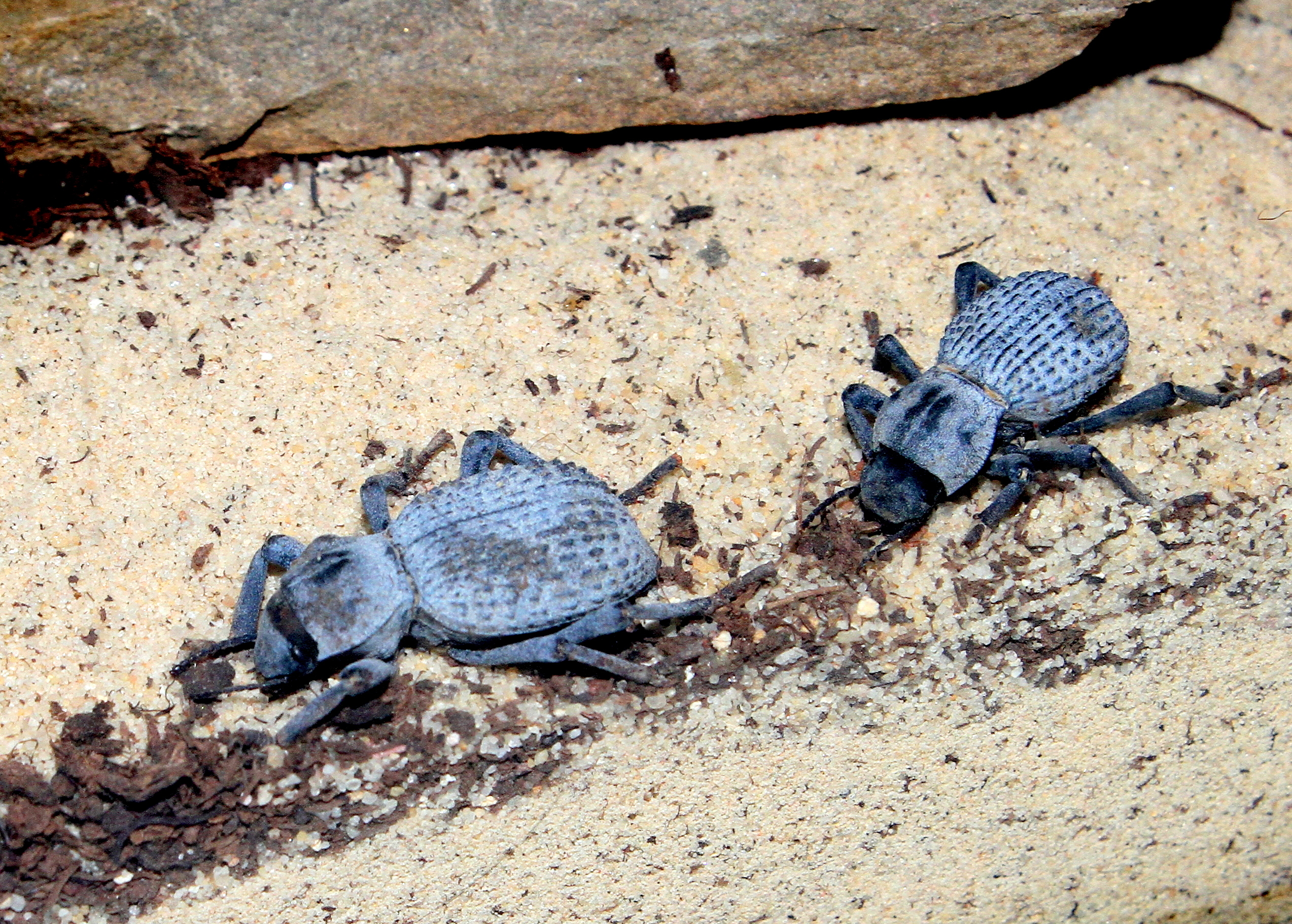
- Asbolus verrucosus

Scientific classification
- Kingdom: Animalia
- Phylum: Arthropoda
- Class: Insecta
- Order: Coleoptera
- Suborder: Polyphaga
- Infraorder: Cucujiformia
- Family: Tenebrionidae
- Tribe: Cryptoglossini
- Genus: Asbolus; LeConte, 1851

= Asbolus (beetle) =

Genus of beetles

Asbolus is a small genus of darkling beetles, beetles of the family Tenebrionidae. They occur in the southwestern United States and Mexico. There are four species:

- Asbolus laevis LeConte, 1851
- Asbolus mexicanus (Champion, 1884)
- Asbolus papillosus (Triplehorn, 1964)
- Asbolus verrucosus LeConte, 1851
