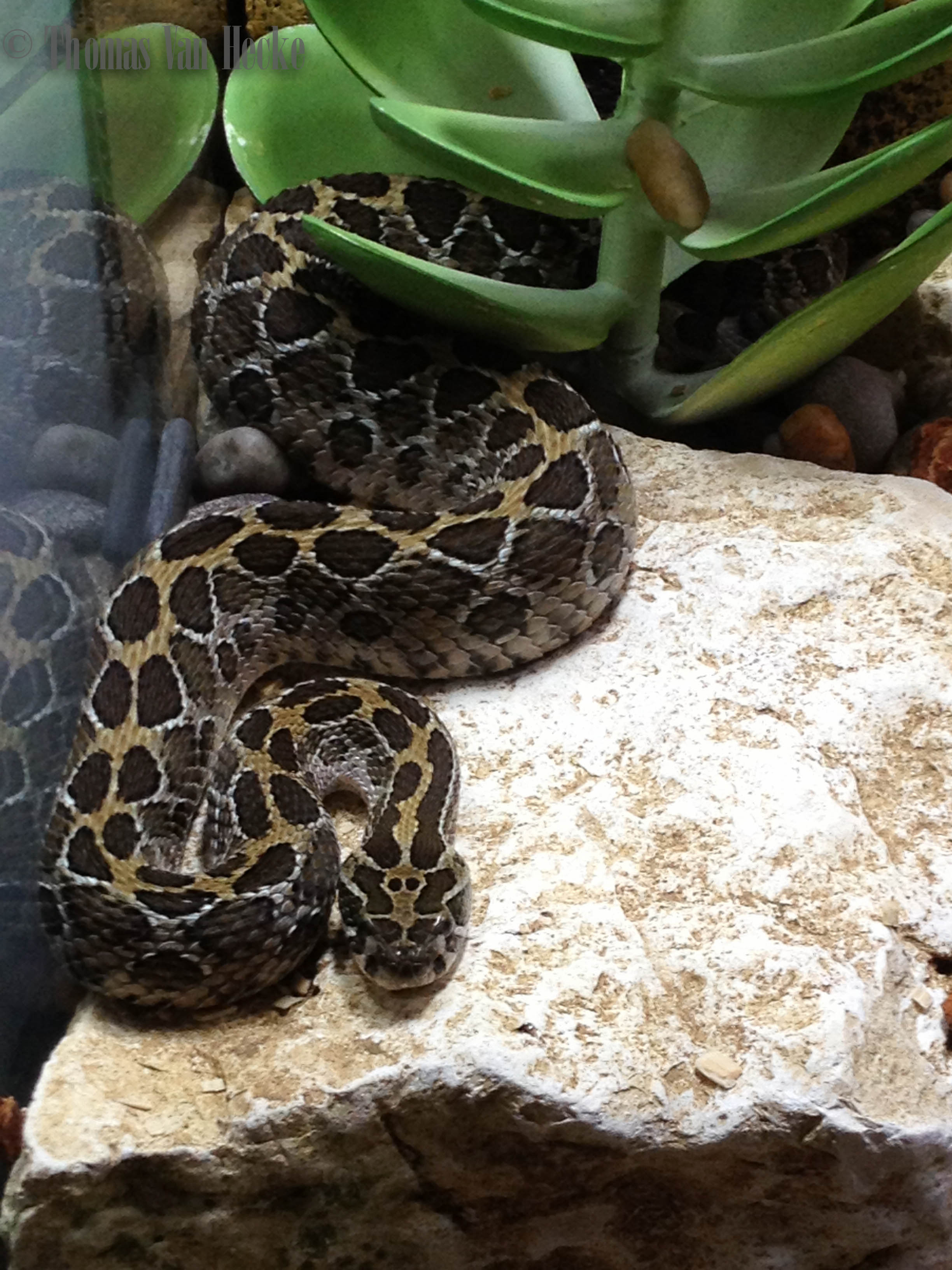

Conservation status
- Least Concern (IUCN 3.1)

Scientific classification
- Kingdom: Animalia
- Phylum: Chordata
- Class: Reptilia
- Order: Squamata
- Suborder: Serpentes
- Family: Viperidae
- Genus: Crotalus
- Species: C. polystictus

Binomial name
- Crotalus polystictus (Cope, 1865)
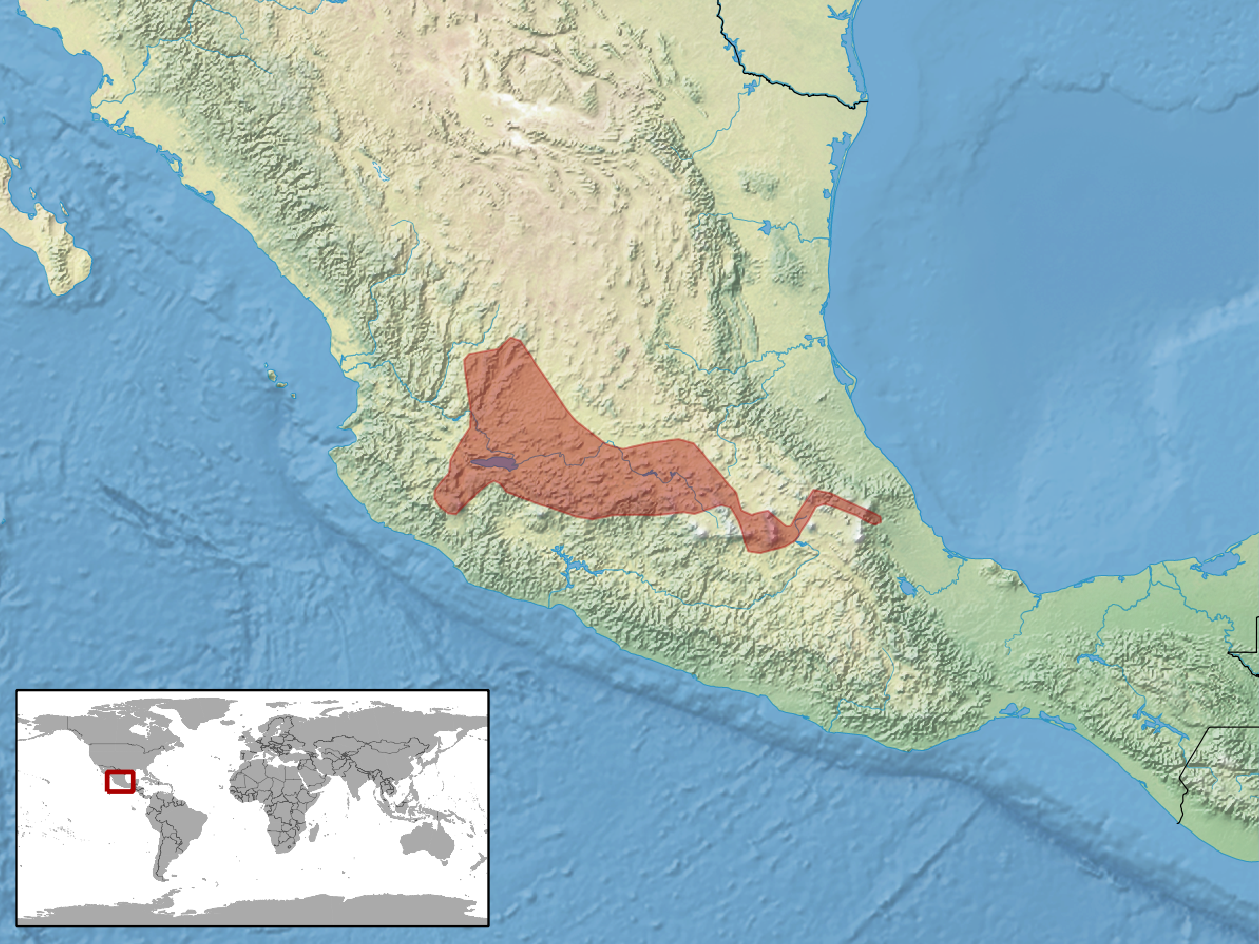

Synonyms
- Crotalus lugubris Jan, 1859 (nomen oblitum); C[rotalus]. lugubris var. multimaculata Jan, 1863 (nomen oblitum); Caudisona polysticta Cope, 1865 (nomen protectum); Crot[alus]. lugubris var. multimaculata – Jan & Sordelli, 1874; C[rotalus]. polystictus – Cope In Yarrow In Wheeler, 1875; Crotalus Jimenezii Dugès, 1877; [Crotalus triseriatus] Var. jimenezii – Garman, 1884; Crotalus polystictus – Boulenger, 1896; Crotalus polystictus – Klauber, 1972

= Crotalus polystictus =

Species of snake

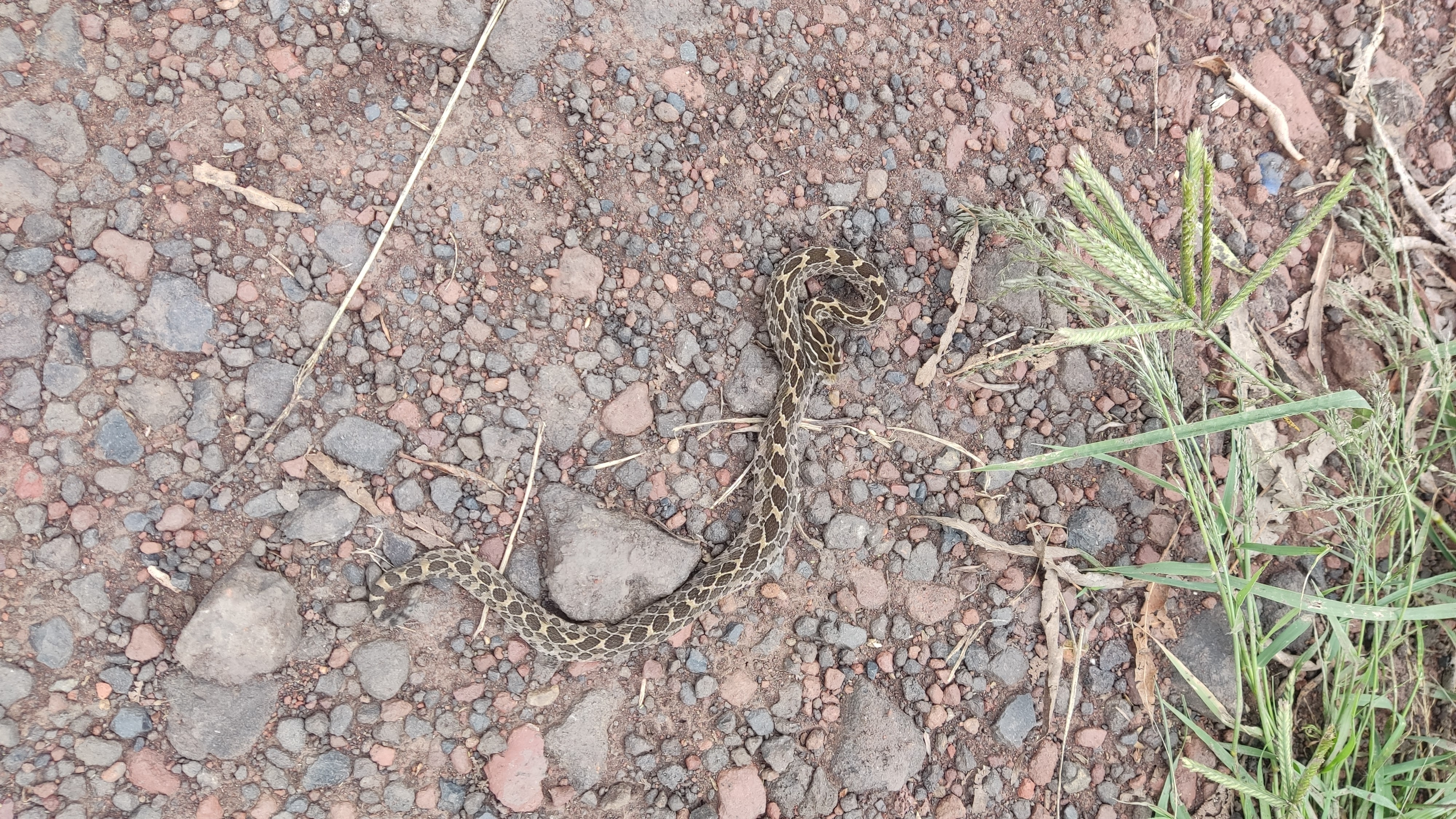
Young example of Crotalus polysticus

The Mexican lance-headed rattlesnake or lance-headed rattlesnake (Crotalus polystictus) is a venomous pit viper species found in central Mexico. No subspecies is currently recognized.

== Description ==
Adults usually grow to a total length of 60 to 70 cm (24 to 28 in), although exceptionally large specimens may be as much as 100 cm (39 in) long.

== Geographic range ==
The species is found on the plateau of central Mexico from southern Zacatecas and northeastern Colima east to east-central Veracruz. It occurs at elevations between 1,450 and 2,600 m (4,760 and 8,530 ft). The type locality given is "Table Land, Mexico", although a restriction to "Tupátaro, Guanajuanto, Mexico" was proposed by H.M. Smith and Taylor (1950).

== Conservation status ==
This species is classified as Least Concern on the IUCN Red List of Threatened Species (v3.1, 2001). Species are listed as such due to their wide distribution, presumed large population, or because they are unlikely to be declining fast enough to qualify for listing in a more threatened category. The population trend was down when assessed in 2007.
