= Gatorland =

Florida theme park and wildlife preserve

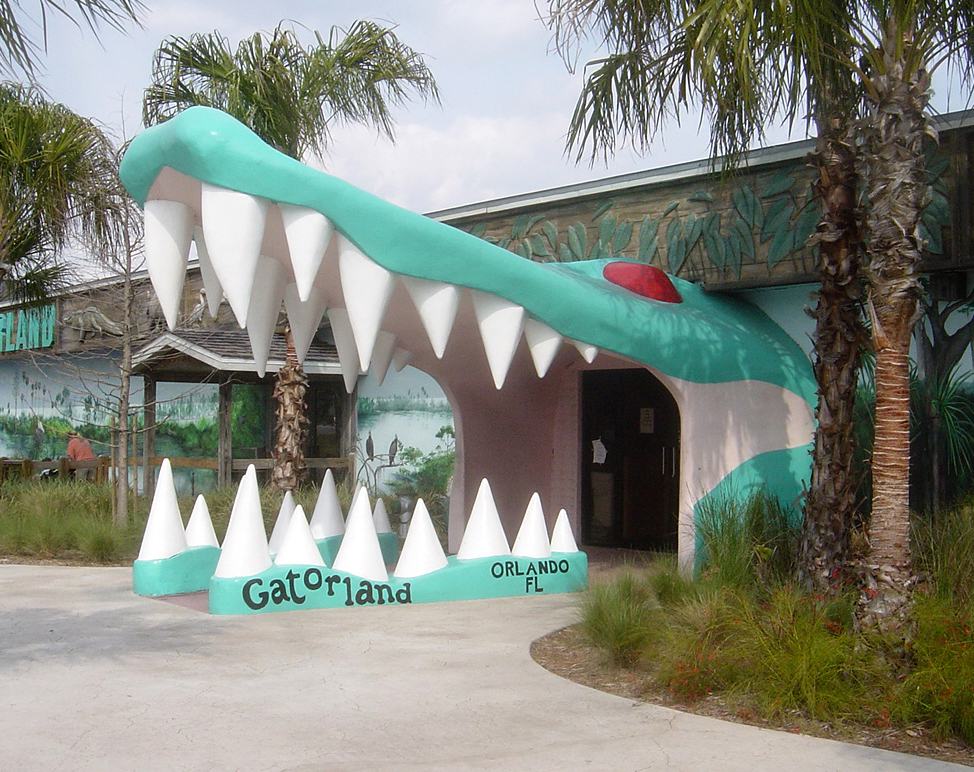
- Gatorland entrance
- Interactive map of Gatorland
- 28.3557°N 81.404°W
- Date opened: 1949, 77 years ago
- Location: Orlando, Florida
- Public transit: #108
- Website: www.gatorland.com

Gatorland is a 110-acre (45 ha) theme park and wildlife preserve in Florida, located along South Orange Blossom Trail south of Orlando. It was founded in 1949 by Owen Godwin on former cattle land, and is privately owned by his family. Though the address is given as being in Orlando, the actual location is in Southchase.

Billed as the "Alligator Capital of the World," Gatorland features thousands of alligators (including rare leucistic alligators) and crocodiles, and many other animals. Attractions in the park include a breeding marsh with a boardwalk and observation tower, zip lines, an off-road swamp vehicle tour, a ridable miniature railroad, alligator feeding shows, alligator wrestling shows, an aviary, a petting zoo, and educational programs. The breeding marsh area of the park was used in the filming of the 1984 movie Indiana Jones and the Temple of Doom.

The park is known for buying and rescuing nuisance alligators from trappers that would otherwise be killed for their meat and skin. It is also the home of an alligator named Jawlene, who is missing an upper jaw. Gatorland also manages the live alligator display at the Gaylord Palms resort in Kissimmee.

== Gatorland Express ==
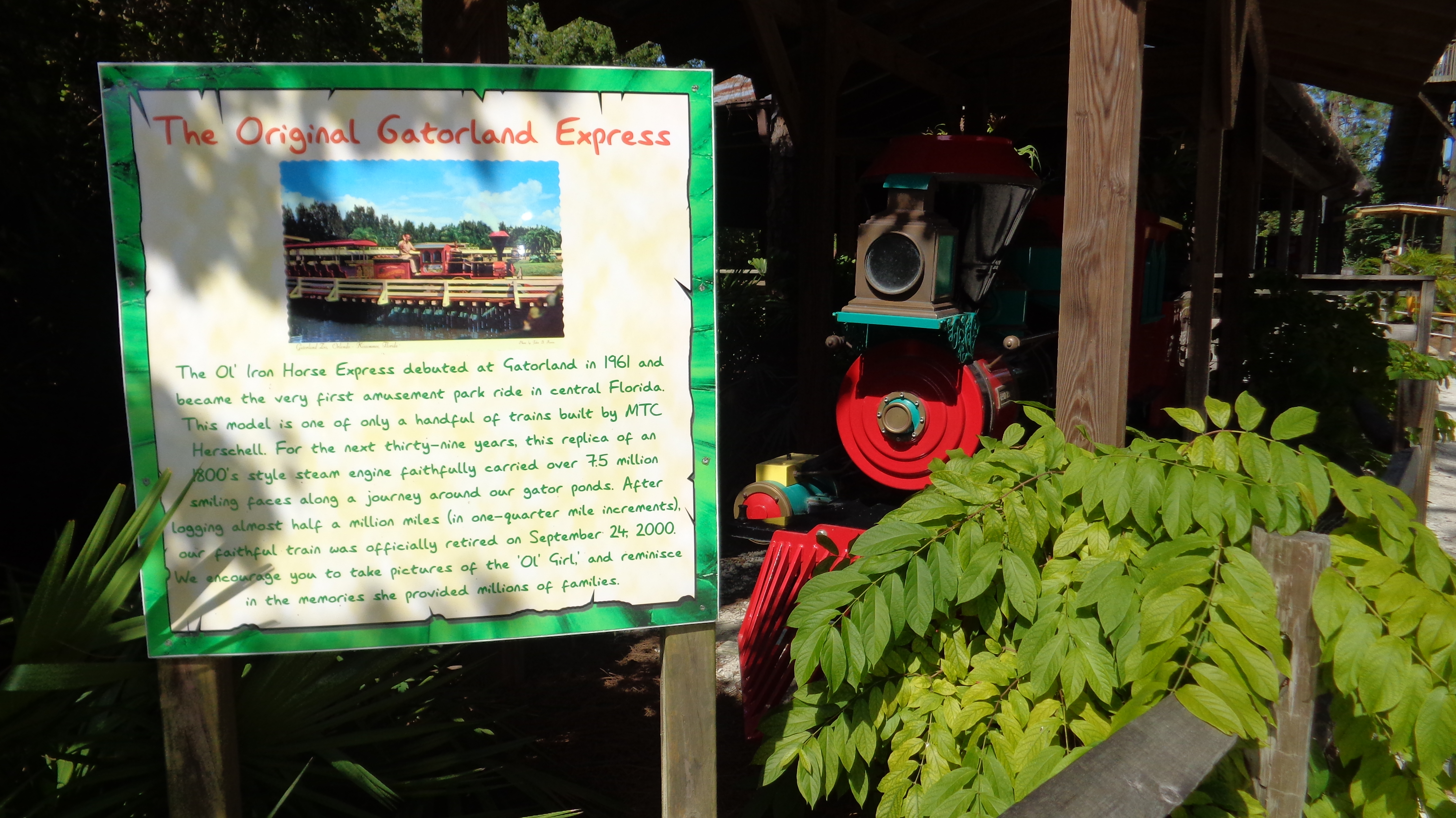
The original locomotive used for the railroad attraction in Gatorland

The Gatorland Express, known as Ol' Iron Horse Express prior to 2001, is a 2 ft (610 mm) narrow gauge railroad attraction inside the park, which first opened in 1961 and was originally built by the Allan Herschell Company. The park claims that the Gatorland Express is the first amusement attraction in Central Florida. The original locomotive was retired in 2000 and put on static display, while a brand-new locomotive built by Custom Locomotive of Chicago was purchased and put into operation the following year. The new locomotive is the same model as the locomotive previously used at the former Green Meadows Petting Farm in Kissimmee. An additional fee is required to ride the railroad and prior to the 2011 opening of the zip line, it was the only non-animal-related attraction in Gatorland.

== Gatorland White Gator Swamp ==
The White Gator Swamp, is an indoor area with a museum feel to it where guests can see the albino gators from the other side of a glass wall. In this enclosed area, there are signs that give facts about these gators including the origin of their white color, how they're different from other gators, and when they were first spotted.

== 2006 fire ==
Shortly before sunrise on Monday, November 6, 2006, a three-alarm fire broke out at Gatorland, believed to be started when a heating pad in one of the displays in the gift shop shorted out; arson was not suspected. The fire was brought under control within several hours, but the gift shop was completely destroyed, and several walkways also burned. The fire killed a four-foot-long crocodile and two six-foot-long pythons. During the day, the birds that are displayed in and around the shop were moved to the aviary at the back of the park and were not injured.

After inspectors confirmed that there was no structural damage to the various walkways and displays at the park, Gatorland reopened less than three weeks later the day after Thanksgiving. The gift shop and main offices were rebuilt as a two-story concrete block building, incorporating the repainted historic concrete alligator's mouth, and opened on May 22, 2008.

== Zip line ride ==
In the summer of 2011, Gatorland added a zip line that travels across a pool of alligators and past several of the existing attractions. The ride is approximately 1,200 feet (370 m) long and several stories high. It is available for riders 37 inches (94 cm) tall or more. In January 2016, Gatorland made the zip line wheelchair-accessible.

== Gator Spot ==
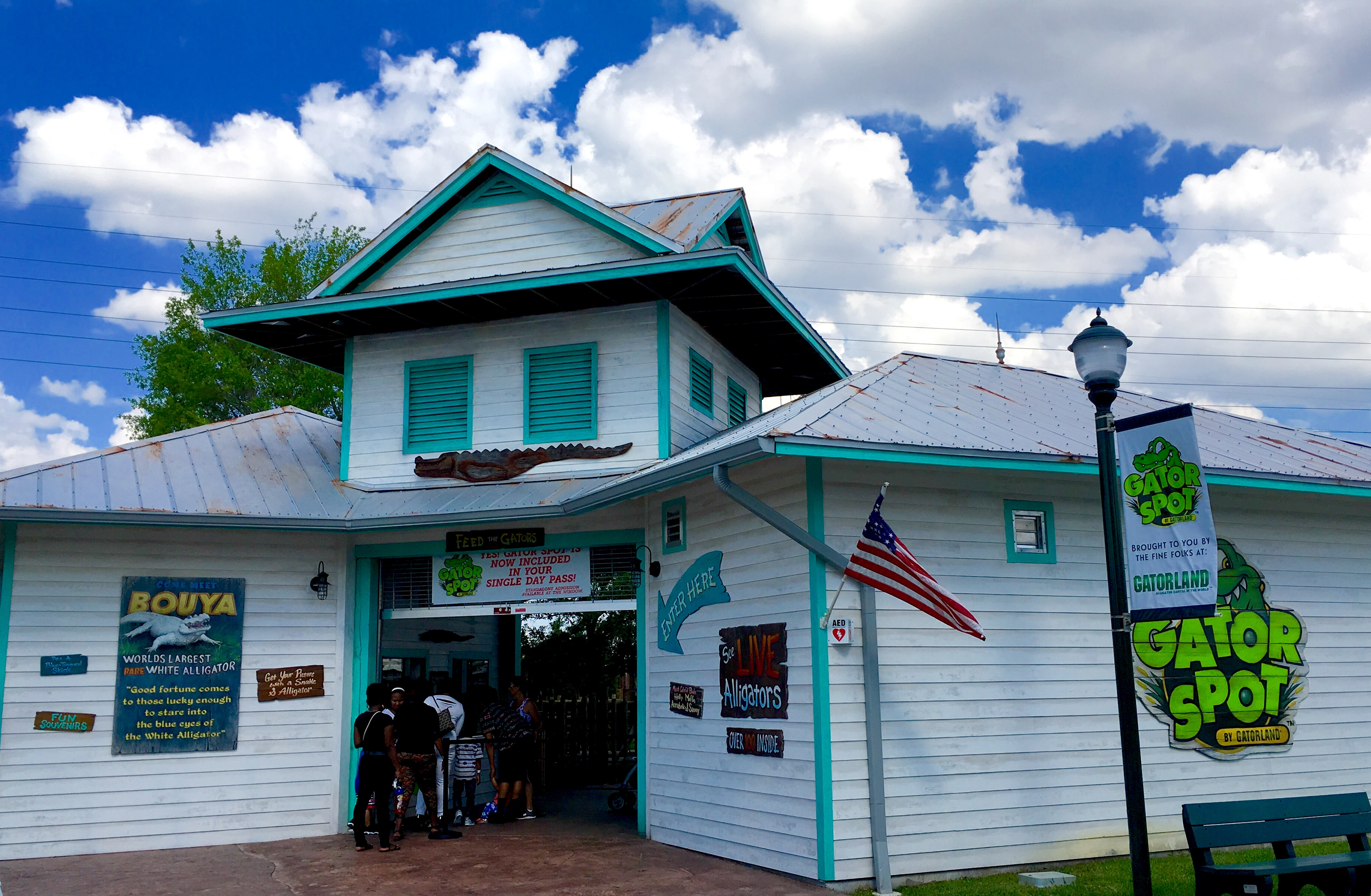
Gator Spot entrance at Fun Spot America Orlando

Gatorland opened Gator Spot at Fun Spot America Theme Parks' Orlando park in the International Drive tourist area on May 11, 2015. The $1 million attraction allows visitors to hold, take photos with, and feed alligators. The main attraction is a leucistic alligator named Bouya, a white gator with blue eyes.

== Gallery ==
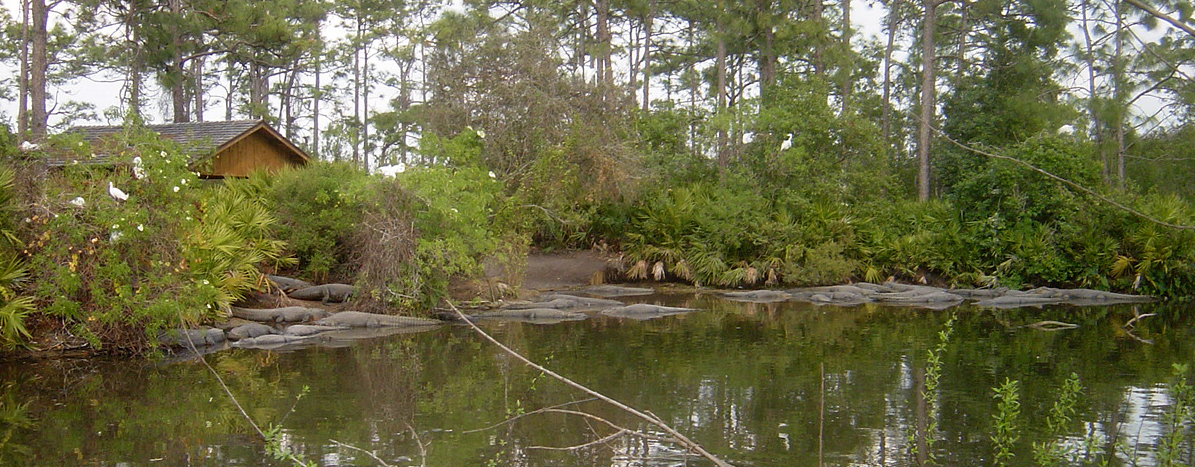
Dozens of alligators in the breeding marsh

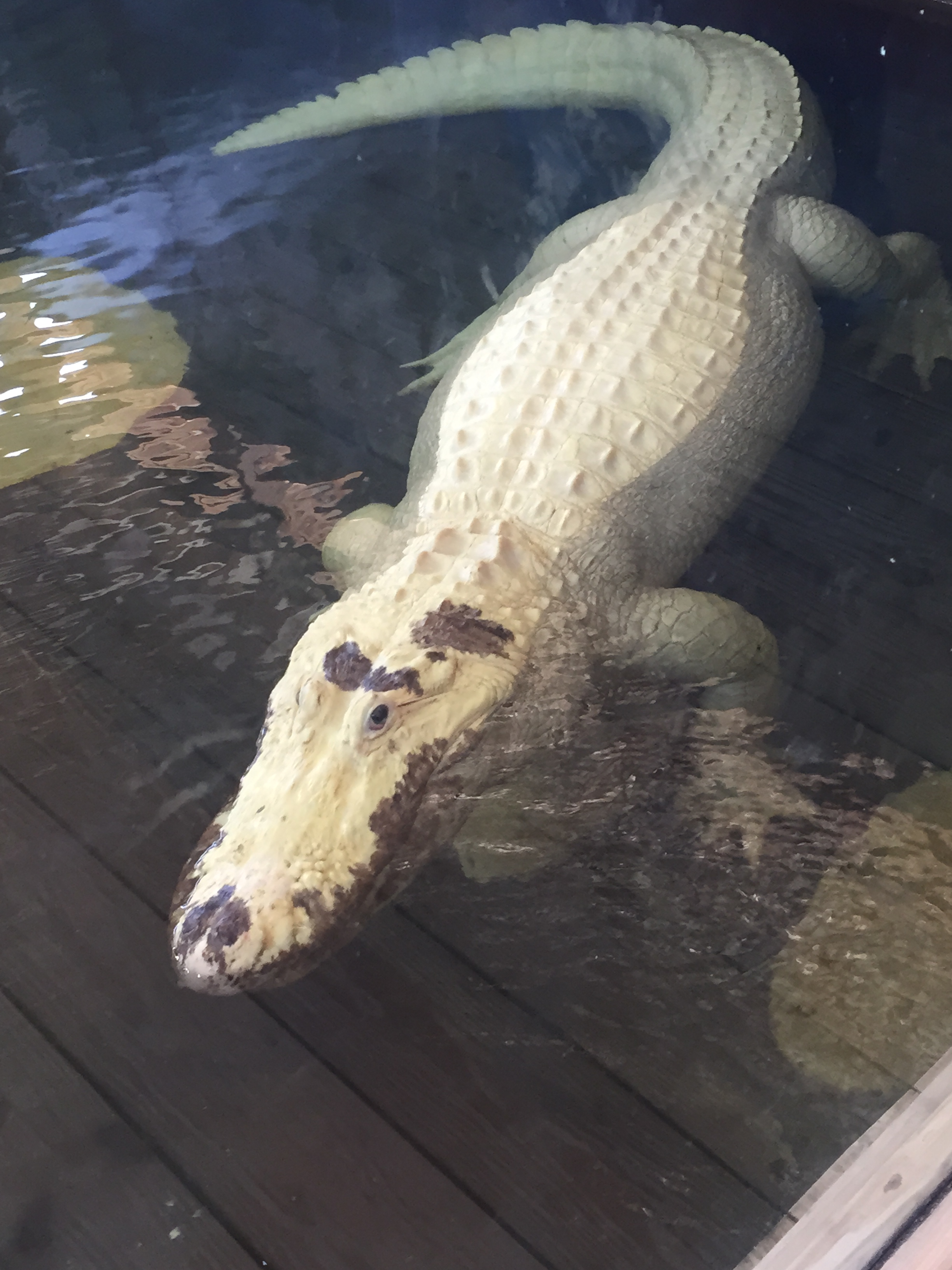
Leucistic alligator

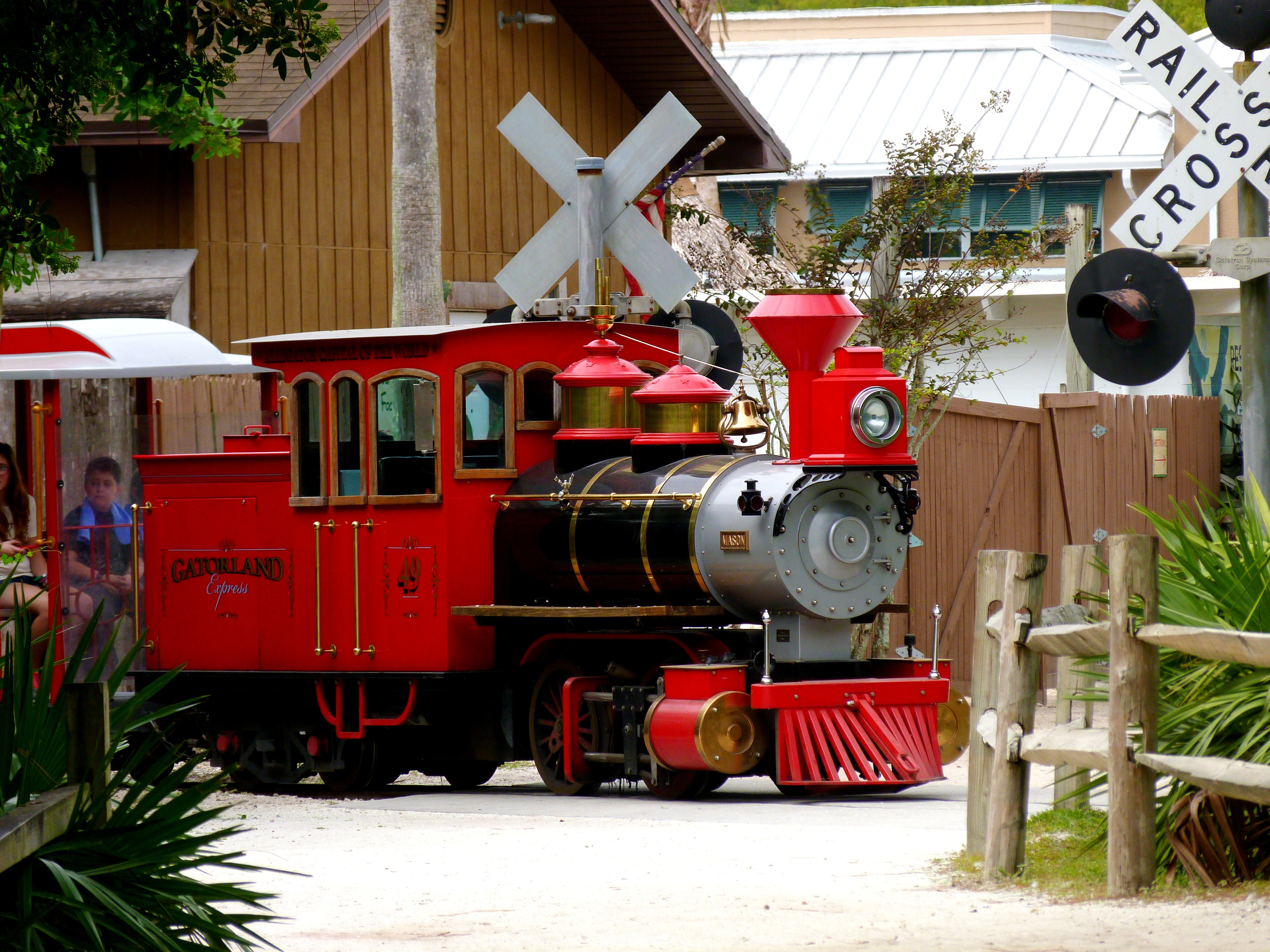
The current Gatorland Express locomotive

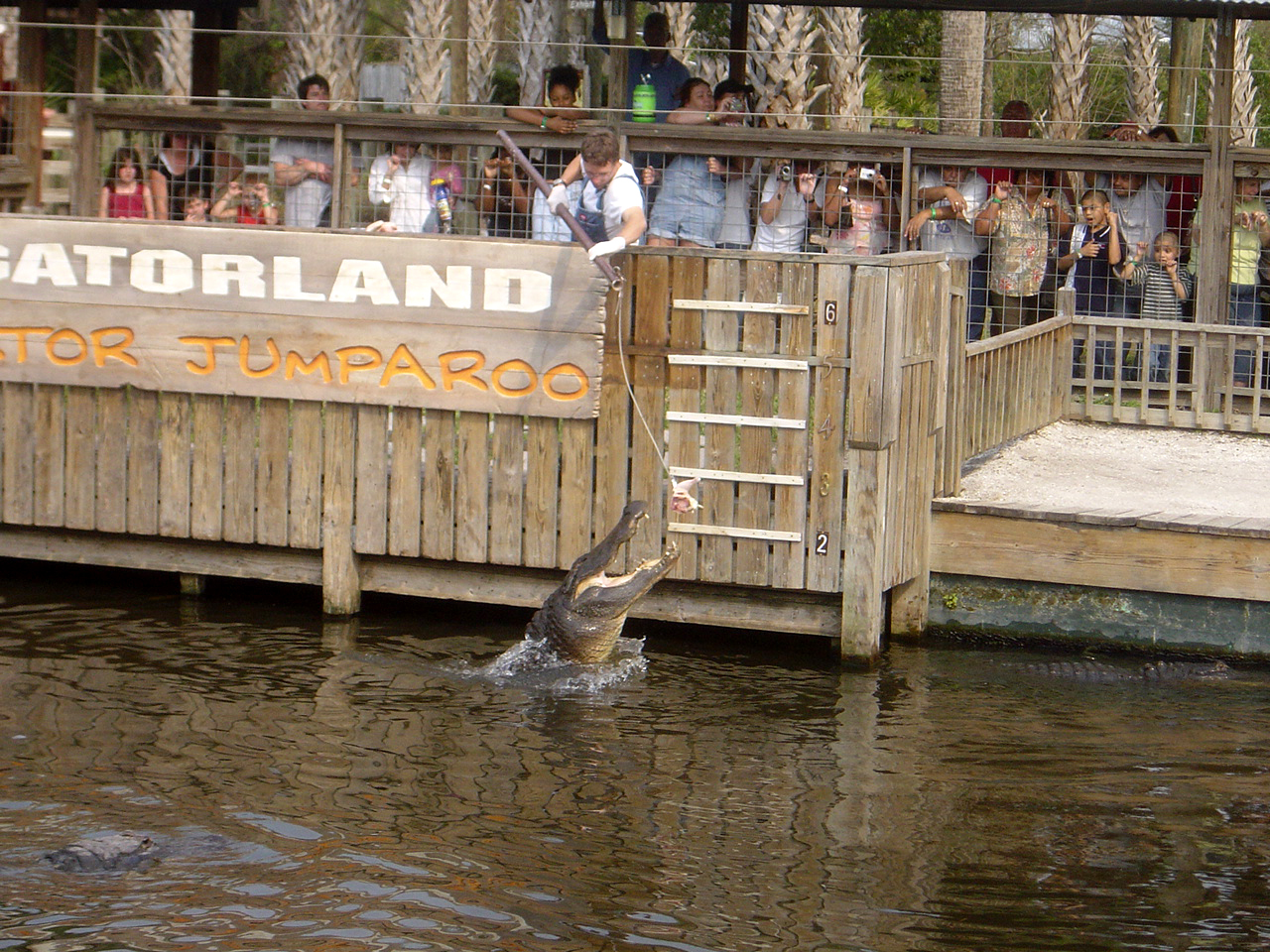
Alligator feeding

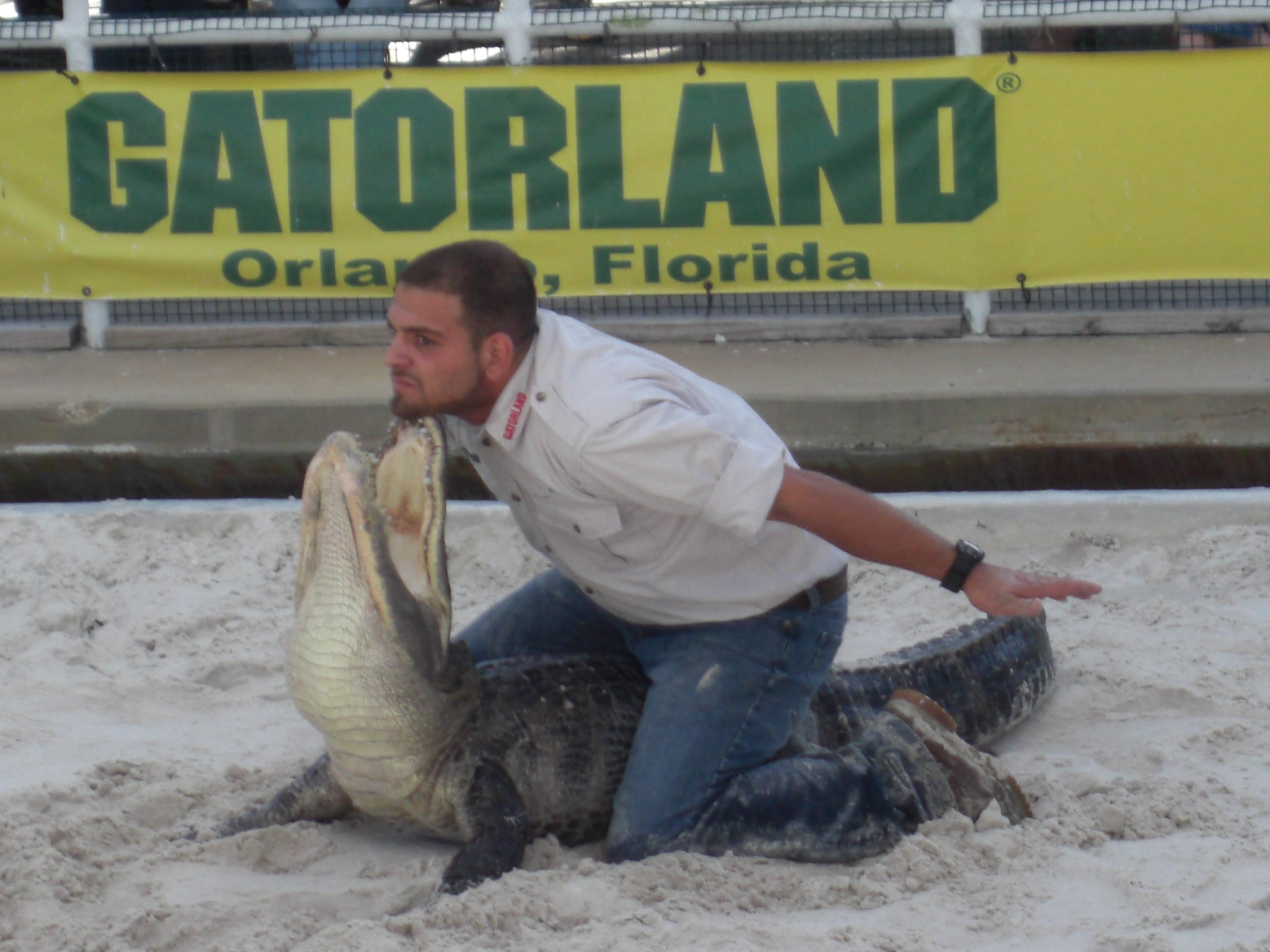
Alligator wrestling

== See also ==
- Central Florida Zoo and Botanical Gardens
