= Splendid China (Florida) =

Theme park in Four Corners, Florida (1993–2003)

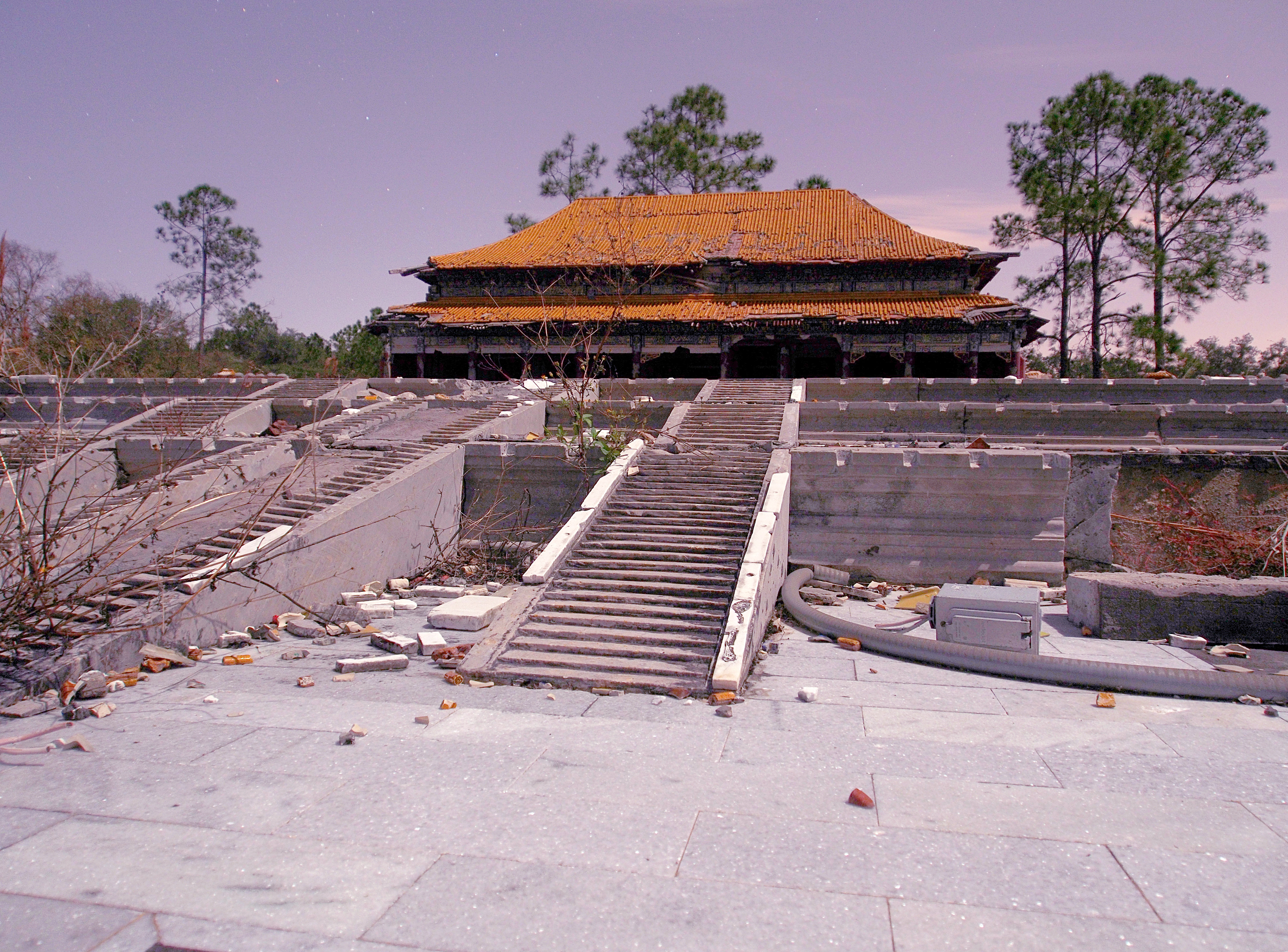
- The derelict Imperial Palace in 2012
- Interactive map of Splendid China
- Location: Four Corners, Florida, United States
- Coordinates: 28°20′03″N 81°36′31″W
- Status: Defunct
- Opened: late 1993
- Closed: December 31, 2003
- Owner: China Travel Service (state-owned), Brian Anderson
- Theme: Ancient China
- Area: 75 acres (30 ha)

Splendid China was a theme park in Four Corners, Florida. It opened in 1993 and closed on December 31, 2003. It was a sister park to the Splendid China in Shenzhen, China, and cost $100 million to build.

It was a 75-acre (30 ha) miniature park with more than 60 replicas at a one-tenth scale at its height of popularity. Each piece was handcrafted to maintain authenticity. Initially, Chinese artists were hired to perform in the park. After a number of them tried to seek political asylum in the United States, they were replaced by local performers.

Citizens Against Communist Chinese Propaganda criticized the Chinese government's ownership of Splendid China; the state-owned corporation China Travel Service owned and operated the theme park.

== History ==
=== Origins ===
The original idea for the Florida Splendid China theme park was that of Josephine Chen, a former educator from Taiwan. In 1988, Chen toured a prototype park, "Splendid China Miniature Scenic Spot", in Shenzhen, China operated by China Travel Service (CTS). This park is close to Hong Kong. 3.5 million people visited the park during the first year. CTS recouped its US$100 million investment during this first year.

She negotiated an agreement with CTS, controlled by Overseas Chinese Affairs Office, under the China National Tourism Administration. Under the agreement, Chen supplied the land and management services, while CTS would construct the building, and supply non-management personnel.

=== Construction ===
On December 19, 1989, groundbreaking ceremonies were held for the start of construction for Florida Splendid China.

The park's replica of the Great Wall took nearly seven million 1-inch (25 mm) long bricks and stretched about .5 miles (0.80 km). The replica of the Leshan Buddha was four stories tall.

=== Buyout ===
In December 1993, the American partners were bought out by the Chinese government. The former president, Brian Anderson, was retained until 1996 when he was replaced by Sunny Yang.

=== Changes in 1996 ===
In May 1996, the Orlando Sentinel reported that the President, General Manager, and Senior Vice-president for Entertainment were replaced in what was described as a 'big management shakeup'.

In July 1996, the Orlando Business Journal reported that Florida Splendid China was changing their name to "Chinatown." In August 1996, the Orlando Business Journal reported that marketing department of Florida Splendid China had shrunk by 5 positions.

=== FARA violation ===
In March 1998, the Orlando Sentinel reported that Citizens Against Communist Chinese Propaganda asked Attorney General Janet Reno and the US Department of Justice to investigate Florida Splendid China for violation of the Foreign Agents Registration Act.

In May 1999, the Far East Economic Review reported that Florida Splendid China was losing $9 million a year.

== Protests and bans ==
A group called Citizens Against Communist Chinese Propaganda (CACCP) staged several protests at the park against perceived Chinese Communist Party propaganda in the Mongolian and Tibetan exhibits.

In November 1995, the Pinellas County, Florida school board voted to ban trips to Florida Splendid China. In March 1996, at the 11th demonstration against perceived Chinese Communist Party propaganda in the Tibetan, Mongolian and Eastern Turkestan exhibits, five college students sat down and closed the front gate to Florida Splendid China while a large crowd of demonstrators watched.

On April 19, 1996, the Representative Assembly of the 1996 Florida Teaching Professionals-NEA State Conference in Orlando passed a resolution to ban personal or school trips to Florida Splendid China by its members. The resolution passed overwhelmingly.

In October 1997, the brother of the 14th Dalai Lama of Tibet (Takster Rinpoche), attended the 20th demonstration at Florida Splendid China to commemorate the 48th anniversary of takeover of Eastern Turkestan.

In December 1999, CACCP held the 32nd demonstration at the main gate of Florida Splendid China to commemorate the 6th anniversary of the Grand Opening.

== Plans for closure ==
In May 2000, the Orlando Business Journal reported that Sunny Yang, Florida Splendid China president, confirmed that the property was about to be sold. Additionally, sources closely related to the attraction had said that the park was to be sold and closed.

In November 2000, the Orlando Business Journal reported that amid allegations of financial mismanagement, the former president (Sunny Yang) of the struggling Splendid China attraction has been sent back to mainland China.

== After closure ==
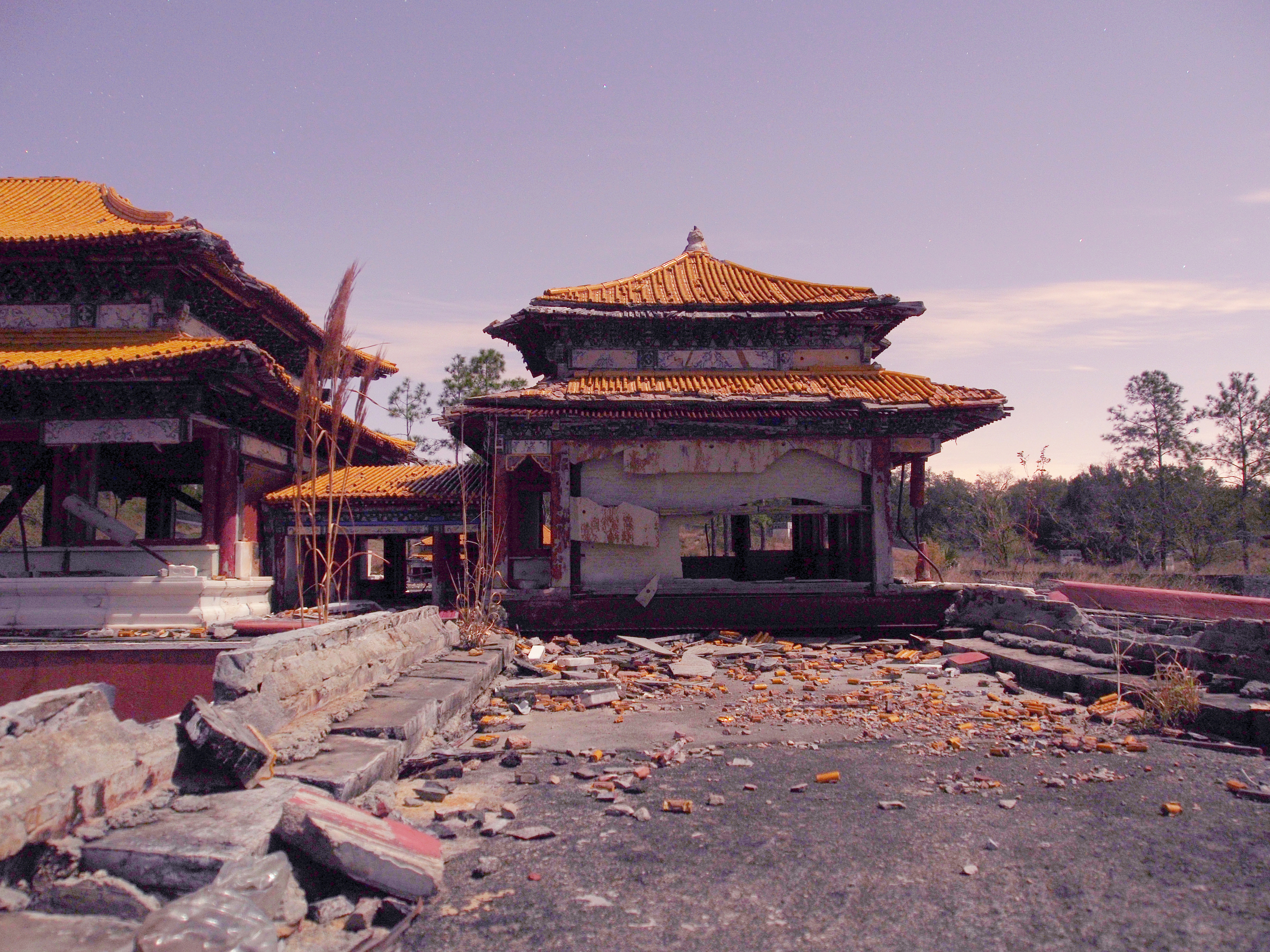
Abandoned park buildings, in 2012

After closing its gates, Splendid China suffered a rash of attacks from thieves and vandals. Hundreds of items were taken ranging from small miniatures to portions of life-size statues. The perpetrators, thought to be local youths, were never caught. The property has passed through several owners and in July 2009 was up for sale at an asking price of $30 million.

On May 9, 2013, the new owners started to tear down the park.

In August 2015, Encore Homes reported that Margaritaville Resort would open on the former Splendid China site, with resort homes and condos and in Jimmy Buffett themed setting.

By March 2016, there was nothing left of the park as construction had begun for the new Margaritaville resort. The former park is located on a parcel of the southern and eastern property of the resort bordering Fins Up Circle, Formosa Gardens Boulevard and Funie Steed Road.

== Exhibits ==
- The Mogao
- The Mogao Grottoes Cave
- The Yungang Grottoes
- The Longmen Grottoes
- Leshan Buddha in Sichuan province
- Buddhist Stone Sculptures in Dazu
- Midair Temple
- Cliffside Tombs
- Stone Forest Yunnan Province
- Shanhai Pass of the Great Wall
- Nine Dragon Wall
- Mongolian Yurt
- Mausoleum of Genghis Khan in Inner Mongolia
- The Great Wall
- 1000 Eyes and 1000 Hands Guanyin Buddha Statue
- Xiang Fei's Tomb (Tomb of Apak Hoja)
- Id Kah Mosque
- Panda Playground
- Bai Dwelling Houses
- Three Ancient Pagodas in Dali
- Manfeilong Pagoda
- The Dai Village
- Jinzhen Octagonal Pavilion
- Potala Palace in Tibet
- Lijiang River Scenery
- Foshan Ancestral Temple in Guangdong Province
- Zhenghai Tower
- Dwelling House of the Hakkas
- Water Village
- Tengwang Pavilion
- West Lake Scenery in Hangzhou
- Town God Temple
- Chinese Garden
- Temple of Confucius
- Summer Palace in Beijing
- Zhaozhou
- Lugouqiao (Marco Polo Bridge) in Beijing
- Forbidden City in Beijing
- Jin Gang Bao Zuo Pagoda
- The White Pagoda in Miaoying Temple in Beijing
- Yingxian Wooden Pagoda
- Terra Cotta Warriors and Horses of Qin Shihuang Mausoleum
- Big Wild Goose Pagoda in Xi'an
- Jiayuguan Pass of the Great Wall
- Ancient Star-Observatory
- Memorial Temple of Zhuge Liang (Temple of Marquis Wu)
- Buyi Village
- Miao Village
- Wind and Rain Bridge, Drum Tower of the Dong
- Yueyang Pavilion (Tower)
- Yellow Crane Tower in Wuhan
- Feihong Pagoda
- Shaolin Temple
- Pagoda Forest at Shaolin Temple
- Jin Ancestral Temple
- Temple of Heaven in Beijing, and seen at China Pavilion at Epcot
- Sun Yat-sen Mausoleum in Nanjing
