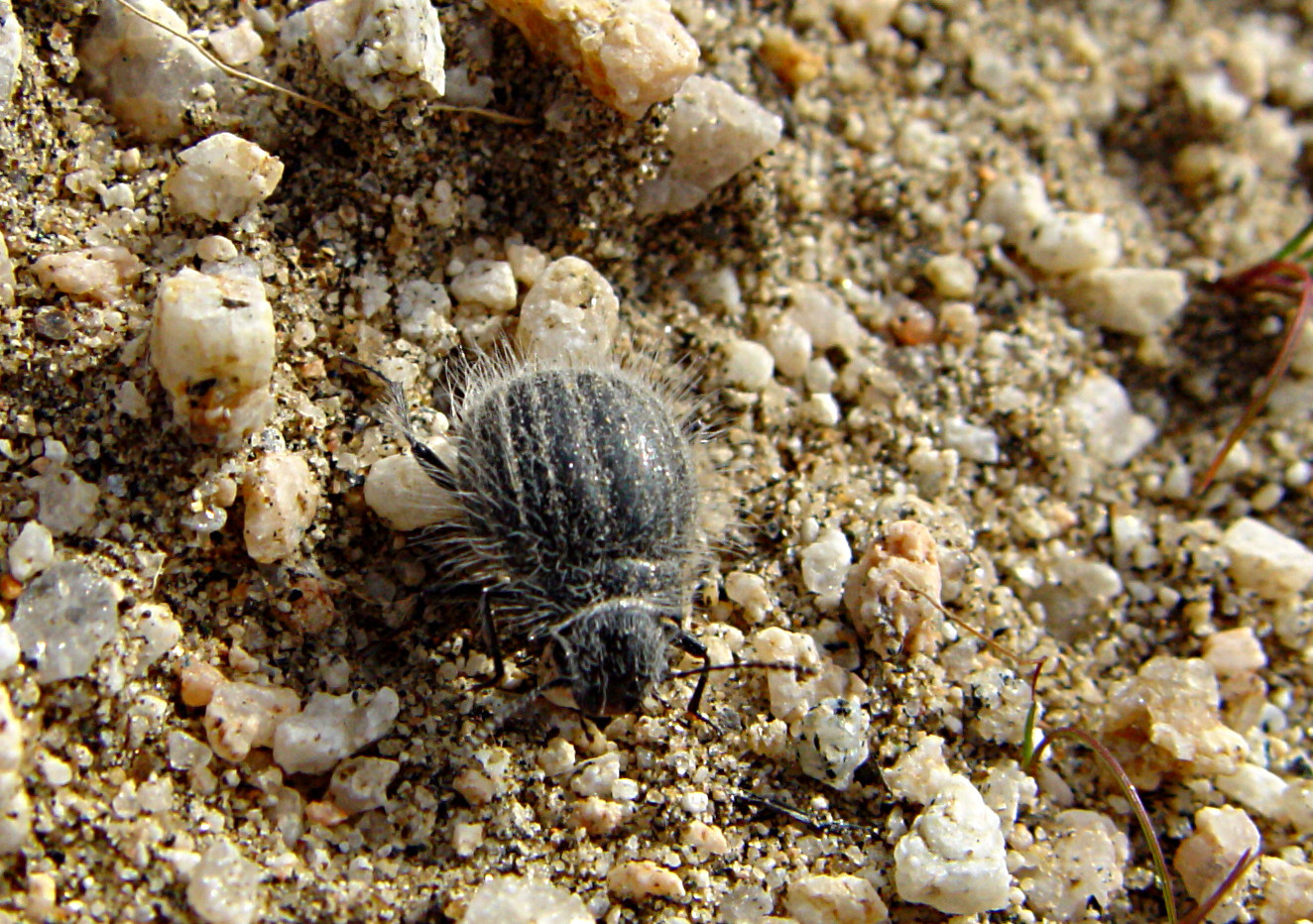

Scientific classification
- Kingdom: Animalia
- Phylum: Arthropoda
- Class: Insecta
- Order: Coleoptera
- Suborder: Polyphaga
- Infraorder: Cucujiformia
- Family: Tenebrionidae
- Genus: Edrotes
- Species: E. ventricosus

Binomial name
- Edrotes ventricosus LeConte, 1851

Synonyms
- Edrotes angusticollis Casey, 1907; Edrotes asperatus Blaisdell, 1923; Edrotes barrowsi Dajoz, 1999; Edrotes laticollis Casey, 1924; Edrotes longicornis Casey, 1924; Edrotes longipennis Casey, 1907; Edrotes mexicanus Blaisdell, 1923; Edrotes nitidus Casey, 1890; Edrotes orbus Casey, 1907; Edrotes variipilis Casey, 1924

= Edrotes ventricosus =

Species of beetle

Edrotes ventricosus, the hairy robot beetle or desert hairy robot beetle, is a species of darkling beetle within the family Tenebrionidae. This species is found in the southwestern region of North America, inhabiting desert environments in the southwestern United States (California, Nevada, Arizona) and northwestern Mexico (Baja California, Sonora). Individuals are round in shape and grow to sizes of 6.4-10 millimeters, appearing black in coloration with hairs on its dorsal side. It is herbivorous, feeding on various plants both native and introduced. Plants this species feeds on include saltgrass, cheat grass, saltwort, and wild onion. Individuals are active from the seasons of early spring to late winter, with those found in the southern portion of its range being active year-round. Adults may also come out in winter to feed on warmer days. This species can be found as pets for being an easy to keep insect that appear 'cute' with their small round body shape and 'fuzzy' appearance.
