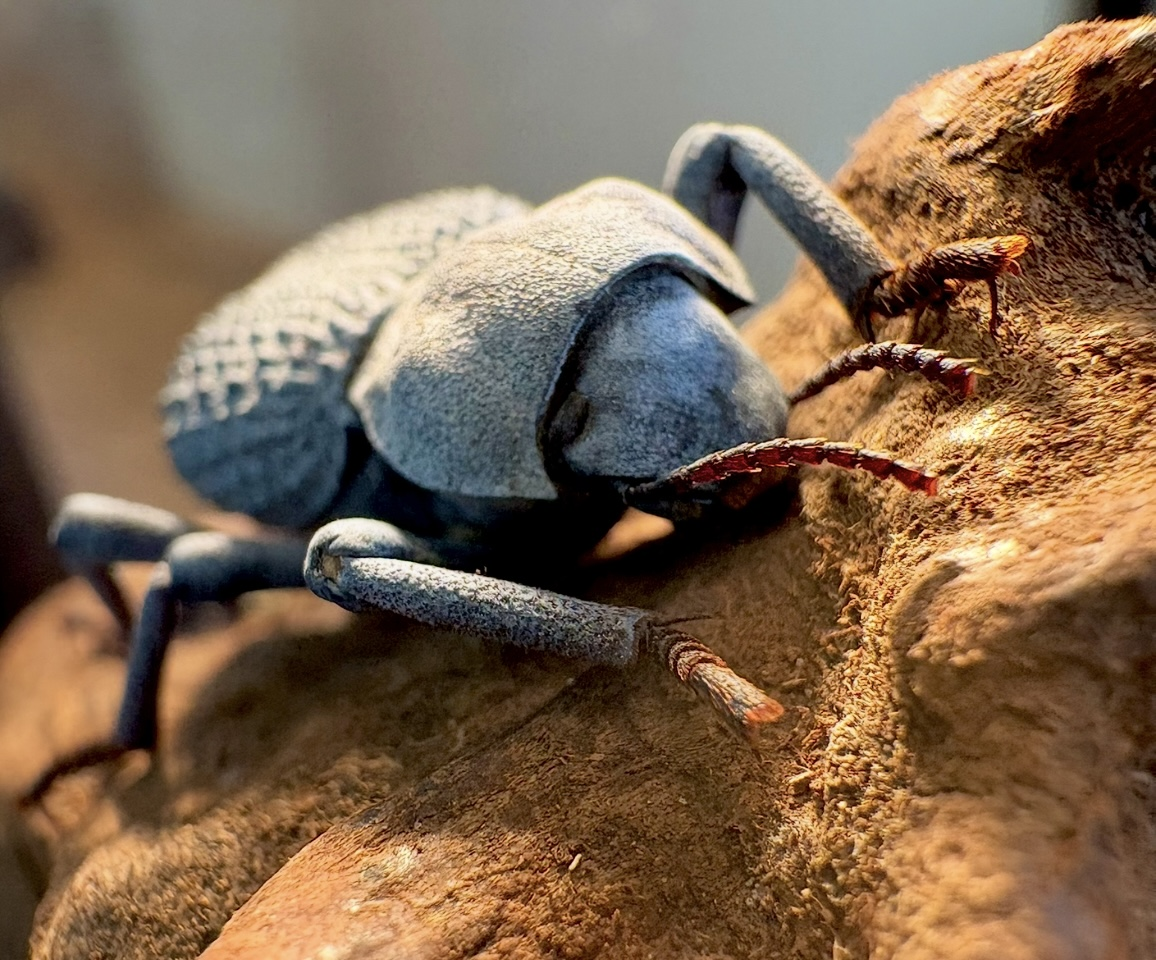

Scientific classification
- Kingdom: Animalia
- Phylum: Arthropoda
- Clade: Pancrustacea
- Class: Insecta
- Order: Coleoptera
- Suborder: Polyphaga
- Infraorder: Cucujiformia
- Family: Tenebrionidae
- Genus: Asbolus
- Species: A. verrucosus

Binomial name
- Asbolus verrucosus LeConte, 1851

Synonyms
- Cryptoglossa verrucosa (LeConte, 1852)

= Asbolus verrucosus =

Species of beetle

Asbolus verrucosus LeConte, 1851, also referred to as the desert ironclad beetle or blue death feigning beetle, is a species of darkling beetle native to southwestern United States (southern California to Utah and New Mexico) and northwestern Mexico, where it inhabits dry, sandy habitats such as the Sonoran and Mojave Deserts. It is highly adapted to hot environments and is omnivorous, consuming dead insects, fruits, lichen, and other plant matter. When threatened, the beetles are able to feign death. A. verrucosus larvae may reflex bleed during their death-feigning ritual. This releases hemolymph which acts as an adhesive, partially covering the larvae in sand and debris, helping evade desert-dwelling predators. The species is becoming increasingly popular in the pet trade, due to their ease of care, hardiness, and longevity.

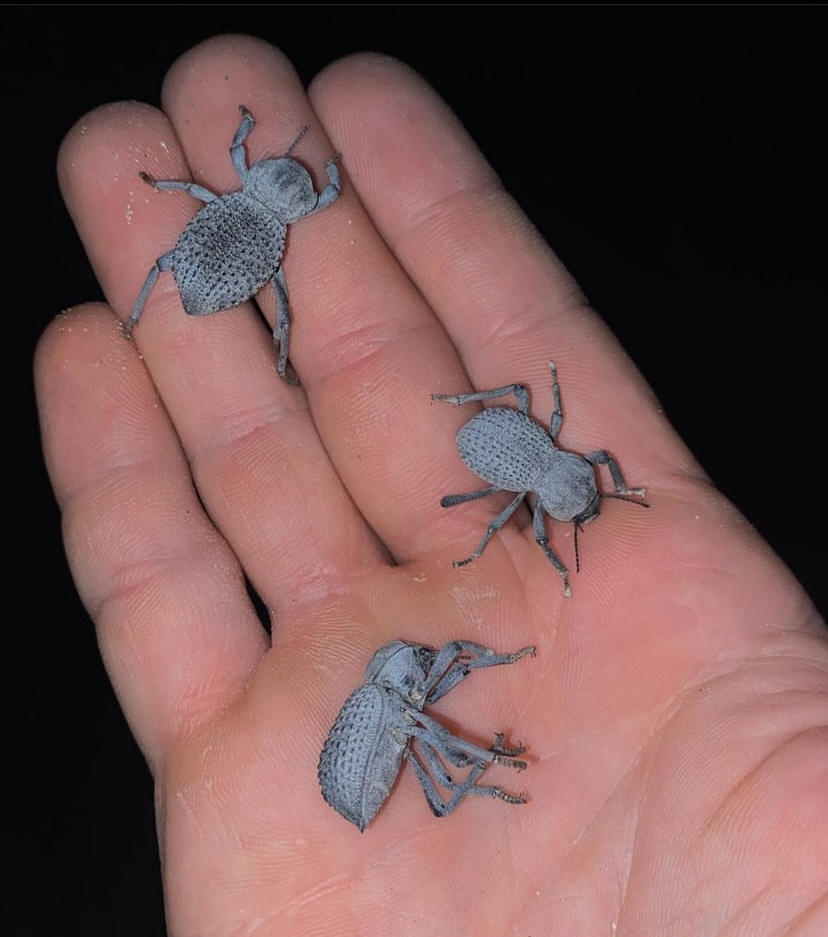
Asbolus verrucosus playing dead

== Description ==
The blue death feigning beetle grows to around 18–21 mm (0.71–0.83 in) length. The species name verrucosus, meaning 'warty', refers to the characteristic bumps on the beetle's elytra. Their powdery blue hue is due to a wax coating on their bodies that prevents loss of moisture. Males are slightly smaller than females, and have bristly red hairs on their antennae. The beetles are crepuscular, being most active at dawn and dusk.

== Captivity ==
The majority of captive beetles are wild-caught, but suit very well in captivity. Whilst these beetles do better in low humidity set-ups, mimicking their natural habitat, their care requirements are minimal, as the beetles do not require extensive heating regulation, and only require sandy substrate and hides to rest under. The beetles are unable to climb on smooth surfaces (plastic or glass), and do best on mainly protein rich food sources, although their diets are extremely diverse—they can be fed vegetables, fruits, lichen, shrimp, dead insects, as well as dog and cat foods. Blue death feigning beetles have been successfully kept with desert hairy scorpions and/or velvet ants. They are also well suited to communal arrangements and are sometimes kept with other Asbolus species including rough death feigning beetles and smooth death feigning beetles as well as other similar desert species such as hairy robot beetles, diabolical ironclad beetles and various other desert darkling beetle species.

== Current research ==
In 2015, the complete mitochondrial genome of the desert darkling beetle was sequenced, funded by the Blue Beetle Genome Project. As of 2015, it was the first fully assembled mitogenome sequence for a darkling beetle in the subfamily Pimeliinae.

The blue death feigning beetle is notoriously difficult to breed in captivity and rear to adulthood; in 2018, researchers at the Cincinnati Zoo were able to rear their first adult beetle after beginning breeding in 2014. Hobbyists have publicly documented their experience with successfully breeding their beetles, noting issues with maintaining proper humidity and heating required for larvae to pupate.
