= Narrow-gauge railroads in the United States =

Standard gauge was favored for railway construction in the United States, although a fairly large narrow-gauge system developed in the Rocky Mountains of Colorado and Utah. Isolated narrow-gauge lines were built in many areas to minimize construction costs for industrial transport or resort access, and some of these lines offered common carrier service. Outside Colorado, these isolated lines evolved into regional narrow-gauge systems in Maine, New York, Pennsylvania, Ohio, Iowa, Hawaii, and Alaska. There was over 10,000 miles of narrow-gauge trackage built in the United States. By 1890, it was beginning to go out of favor, and by 1941, there were only about a dozen narrow-gauge railroads still operating.

== New England ==
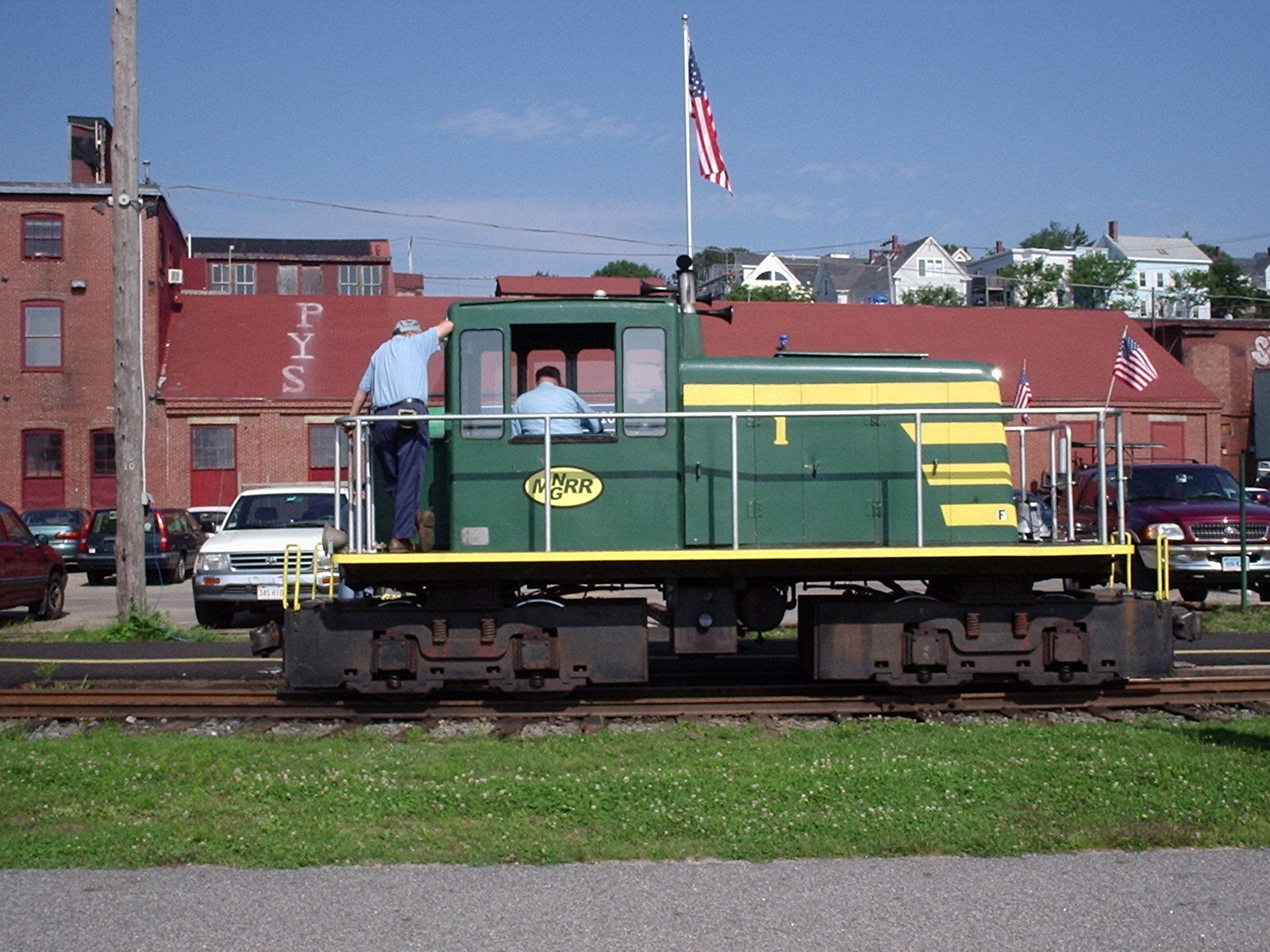
The Maine Narrow Gauge Railroad in Portland, Maine

In New England, the first narrow-gauge common-carrier railroad was the Billerica and Bedford Railroad, which ran from North Billerica to Bedford in Middlesex County, Massachusetts from 1877 to 1878. There were extensive 2 ft (610 mm) gauge lines in the Maine forests early in the 20th century. In addition to hauling timber, agricultural products and slate, the Maine lines also offered passenger services. The Boston, Revere Beach & Lynn Railroad was a narrow-gauge commuter railroad that operated in Massachusetts, much of whose right-of-way is used for rapid transit today. Narrow gauges also operated in the mountains of New Hampshire, on the islands of Nantucket and Martha's Vineyard and in a variety of other locations. The still-operating Edaville Railroad tourist heritage railroad in southeastern Massachusetts is a two-foot narrow-gauge system.

== Mid-Atlantic ==
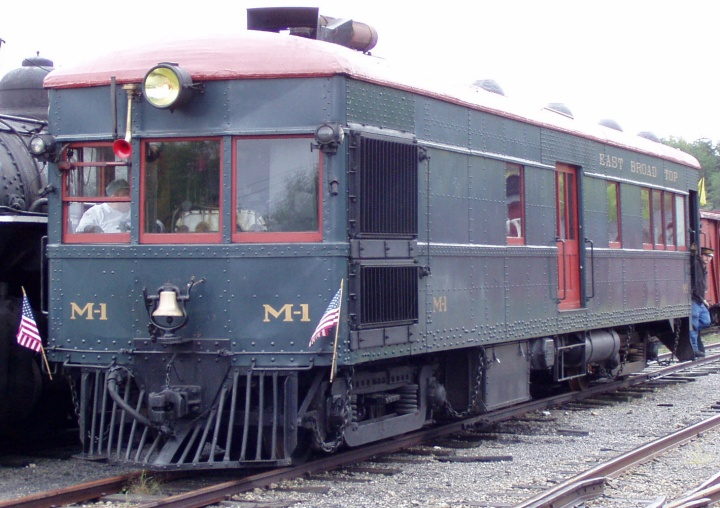
East Broad Top's rare gas-electric railcar M-1

The last remaining 3 ft (914 mm) gauge common carrier east of the Rocky Mountains was the East Broad Top Railroad in central Pennsylvania. Running from 1873 until 1956, it supplied coal to brick kilns and general freight to the towns it passed through, connecting to the Pennsylvania Railroad at Mount Union, Pennsylvania. Purchased for scrap by the Kovalchick Corporation when it ended common carrier service in 1956, it reopened as a tourist railroad in 1960. This line is the oldest surviving stretch of narrow-gauge track in the United States. Financial troubles would force the Kovalchick family to close the railroad following the 2011 season. The railroad sat dormant until 2020 when it was purchased and reopened by the EBT Foundation.

It was the last remnant of an extensive narrow-gauge network in New York and Pennsylvania that included many interconnecting lines. The largest concentration was in the Big Level region around Bradford, Pennsylvania, from which lines radiated towards Pittsburgh and into New York state. This group also included the Tonawanda Valley & Cuba Railroad. Though the TV&C's narrow-gauge tracks are long gone, the standard-gauge Arcade and Attica Railroad continues to run over a portion of the TV&C's route. The Waynesburg and Washington Railroad, a subsidiary of the Pennsylvania Railroad, operated in the southwestern part of the state until 1933.

The Philadelphia and Atlantic City Railway and the Pleasantville & Ocean City Railroad were originally built to 3 ft 6 in (1,067 mm) gauge.

== Southeast ==
The Southeast helped initiate the narrow-gauge era. The first in Georgia was the Kingsboro & Cataula Railway, chartered in 1870. In Tennessee, the Duck River Valley Narrow Gauge Railway was also chartered in 1870, opening seven years later; it was converted to standard gauge in 1888. The first narrow-gauge railway in Alabama was the Tuskegee Railroad in 1871.

Longest lived of its narrow gauges was the East Tennessee and Western North Carolina Railroad. Originally built as a broad gauge in 1866, the line was later converted to a narrow-gauge railroad between Johnson City, Tennessee; Cranberry, North Carolina; and ultimately Boone, North Carolina. It continued in service until 1950.

Another long-lived southern narrow gauge was the Lawndale Railway and Industrial Co.

== Midwest ==
One of the first three narrow gauges in the U.S. – the Painesville & Youngstown – opened in Ohio in 1871, and the narrow-gauge movement reached its greatest length in the Midwest. For a brief time in the 1880s it was possible to travel by narrow gauge from Lake Erie across the Mississippi River and into Texas. The hub of this system, Delphos, Ohio, shared with Durango, Colorado the distinction of being the only towns in the United States from which it was possible to travel by narrow gauge in all four compass directions.

The Chicago Tunnel Company operated a 60-mile (97 km) long underground 2 ft (610 mm) gauge freight railroad under the streets of the Chicago Loop. This common carrier railroad used electric traction, interchanged freight with all of the railroads serving Chicago, and offered direct connections to many loop businesses from 1906 to 1959.

Ohio was a center of the narrow-gauge movement. In addition to serving as the northern end of the Little Giant "transcontinental", it had several other notable lines, including the long-lived Ohio River & Western Railroad, the Kelley Island Lime & Transport Company (the world's largest operator of Shay locomotives, virtually all of them narrow gauge) and the Connotton Valley Railroad, a successful coal hauler still in operation today as the standard-gauge Wheeling & Lake Erie Railroad. Narrow gauge railroad mileage in Ohio reached its peak in 1883 and declined rapidly after 1884.

Numerous 3 ft (914 mm) gauge common-carrier narrow-gauge lines were built in Iowa in the 19th century. The largest cluster of lines radiated from Des Moines, with the Des Moines, Osceola and Southern extending south to Cainsville, Missouri, the Des Moines North-Western extending northwest to Fonda and smaller lines extending north to Boone and Ames. These lines were all abandoned or regauged by 1900. The Burlington and Western and the Burlington and Northwestern system extended from Burlington to Washington, Iowa and the coal fields around Oskaloosa. This system was widened to standard gauge on June 29, 1902, and merged with the Chicago, Burlington and Quincy Railroad a year later. The Bellevue and Cascade, from Bellevue on the Mississippi to Cascade inland remained in service until abandonment in 1936. A caboose from the Bellevue and Cascade is the only surviving piece of Iowa narrow-gauge equipment. It currently operates on the Midwest Central Railroad in Mount Pleasant, a heritage railroad.

In 1882, thirty-two narrow-gauge logging railroads were constructed in Michigan, and by 1889 there were eighty-nine such logging railroads in operation, totaling almost 450 miles (720 km) of track.

== Mountain West ==
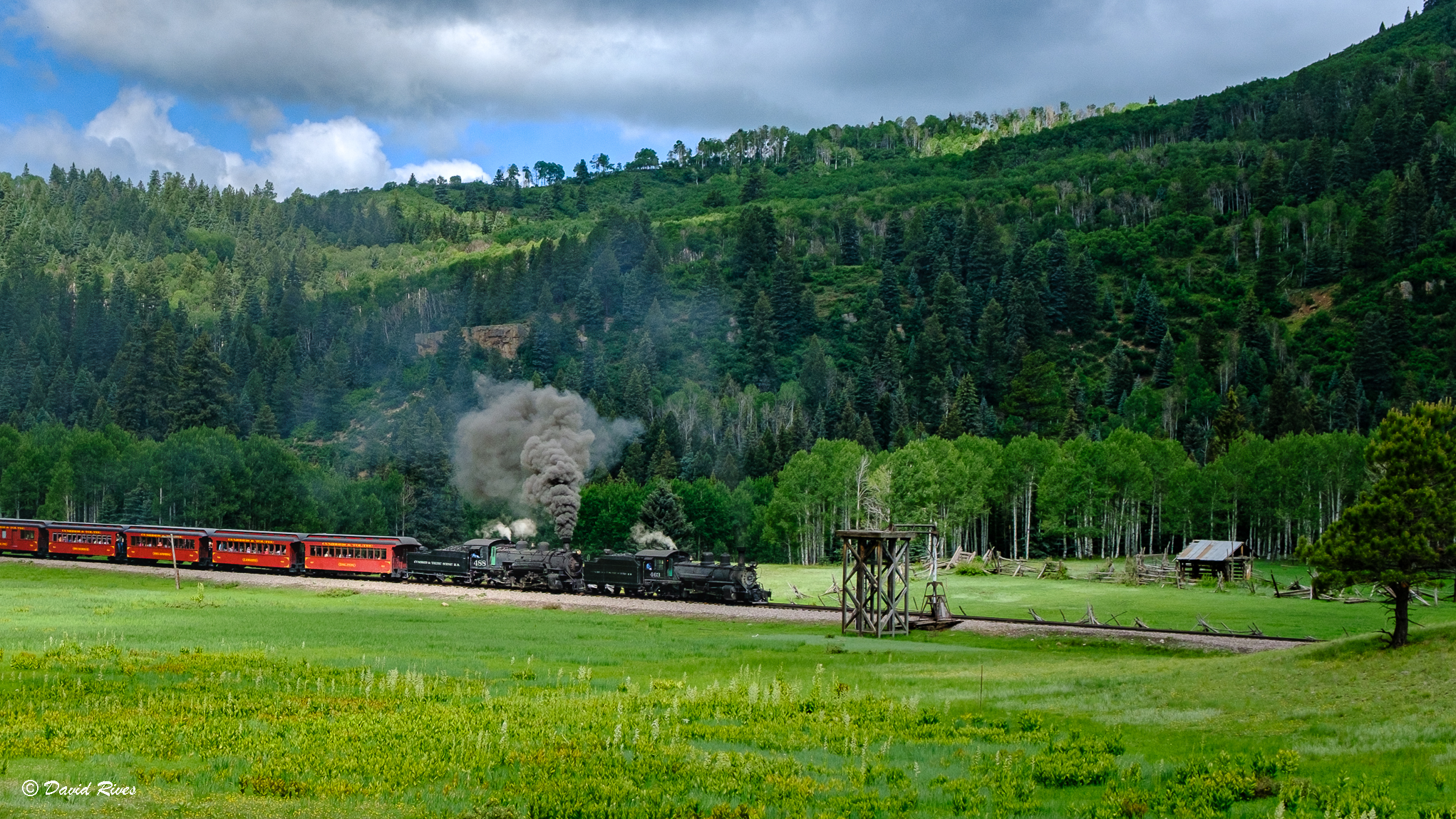
Steam locomotives of the Cumbres and Toltec Scenic Railroad

At its peak, the mountain west region had a narrow gauge system which stretched from Montana to New Mexico; with the majority of routes operating out of central hubs in Colorado and Utah.

The Denver and Rio Grande Railroad, opened in 1871, was one of the earliest narrow gauge railroads in the United States and by far the longest and one of the most significant. The railroad's founder William Jackson Palmer during the early planning stages of the railroad in 1871 visited the Ffestiniog Railway in Wales while on his honeymoon, and while in the United Kingdom consulted with Scottish engineer Robert Francis Fairlie who convinced Palmer of the advantages of building the Rio Grande using narrow gauge.

The Rio Grande effectively circled the state of Colorado, and feeder lines were run to the mining communities of Leadville, Aspen, Cripple Creek, Telluride and Silverton. The Rio Grande would find itself in a railroad war with the Atchison, Topeka and Santa Fe Railway in 1878 from 1880 for control over the Royal Gorge canyon. The conflict would be settled by "The Treaty of Boston" in 1880, allowing the Rio Grande to continue building east towards Leadville and towards Grand Junction through the Black Canyon of the Gunnison. Through affiliated companies, the Rio Grande's lines would extended west to Ogden, Utah and south to Santa Fe, New Mexico.

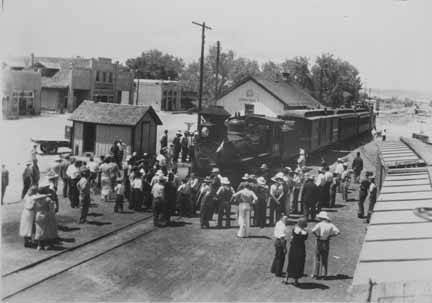
Train at Espanola, New Mexico on the Rio Grande's extension to Santa Fe, New Mexico.

The Rio Grande mainline was gradually re-gauged after it and the Colorado Midland Railway built a new standard gauge joint line to Grand Junction in 1890, but the southern portions remained steam-hauled and narrow gauge into the mid 20th century. This southern segment would be advertised as the "Narrow Gauge Circle" which via a connection with the Rio Grande Southern (which was among various narrow gauge railroads connecting with the larger Denver & Rio Grande which had been built by Otto Mears) allowed travelers to make a continuous journey through the southwestern corner of Colorado onboard narrow gauge trains. The cash strapped Rio Grande Southern would build a fleet of Galloping Goose cars to preserve the mail contract along their route from the 1930s until the lines abandonment in 1952.

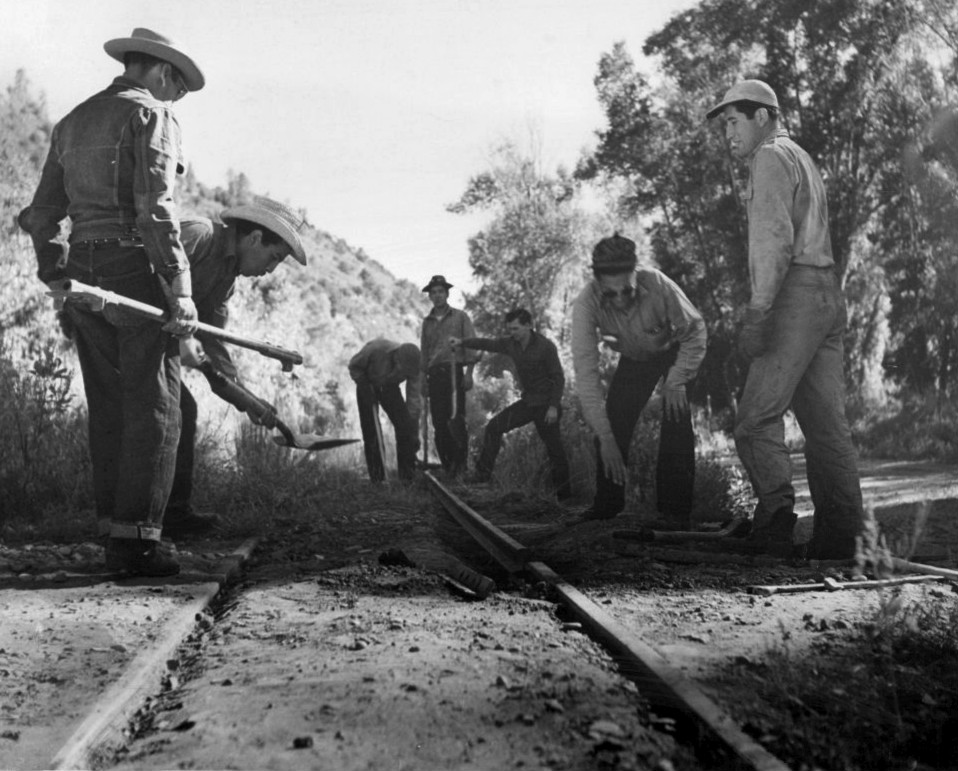
Work crews during the demolition of the Rio Grande Southern Railroad in 1952.

As remaining segments of the Denver & Rio Grande Western's narrow gauge system were abandoned throughout Colorado in the mid-20th century, the San Juan Extension experienced a reprieve with the petroleum industry booming from the 1950s into the 1960s around Farmington, New Mexico. As traffic from the oil boom subsided, the Denver & Rio Grande Western abandoned the narrow gauge from Durango, Colorado to Chama, New Mexico; and the Chama to Antonito, Colorado portion of the line was jointly purchased by the states of Colorado and New Mexico to form the Cumbres and Toltec Scenic Railroad in 1970.

Tourism increased along the Silverton branch following World War II, and the area was popularized through Western films which frequently filmed along the San Juan Extension and the railroad became a popular road trip destination. Unable to abandon the Silverton branch, the D&RGW operated it as an isolated narrow gauge and steam powered route until 1981 when the line was sold and rebranded as the Durango and Silverton Narrow Gauge Railroad.

Operations of the Durango & Silverton and the Cumbres & Toltec have both been impacted by the ongoing Southwestern North American megadrought and fuel availability. The Durango & Silverton was closed by the Missionary Ridge Fire in 2002 marking the first time the railroad would be closed by fire danger in its history. In 2018 the railroad would close again due to the 416 Fire which was attributed to having been caused by the railroad, leading to a lawsuit against the railroad from the Federal Government to recoup fire fighting costs which would be settled with a $20 million fine against the Durango & Silverton. The Durango & Silverton would phase out coal fired steam locomotives, converting their steam locomotive fleet to burn oil to reduce embers, running their final coal fired train in early 2024. Both the Durango & Silverton and Cumbres & Toltec would purchase diesel locomotives from the White Pass and Yukon Route to provide alternative power to steam locomotives during high fire risk seasons and as emergency backups to traditional steam locomotives.

Other major narrow-gauge railroads in Colorado included the Denver, South Park and Pacific, the Colorado Central, and the Florence and Cripple Creek. The Uintah Railway operated in Utah and Colorado, and boasted the tightest curve (Moro Castle curve) on a US common carrier at Baxter Pass. Some short segments of narrow gauge railroads have been rebuilt in Colorado as heritage railroads with the Georgetown Loop Railroad opening in 1973 and the Como Roundhouse having been initially restored and expanded since 1984. The Colorado Railroad Museum established in 1959, operates a demonstration loop of narrow gauge track in Golden, Colorado.

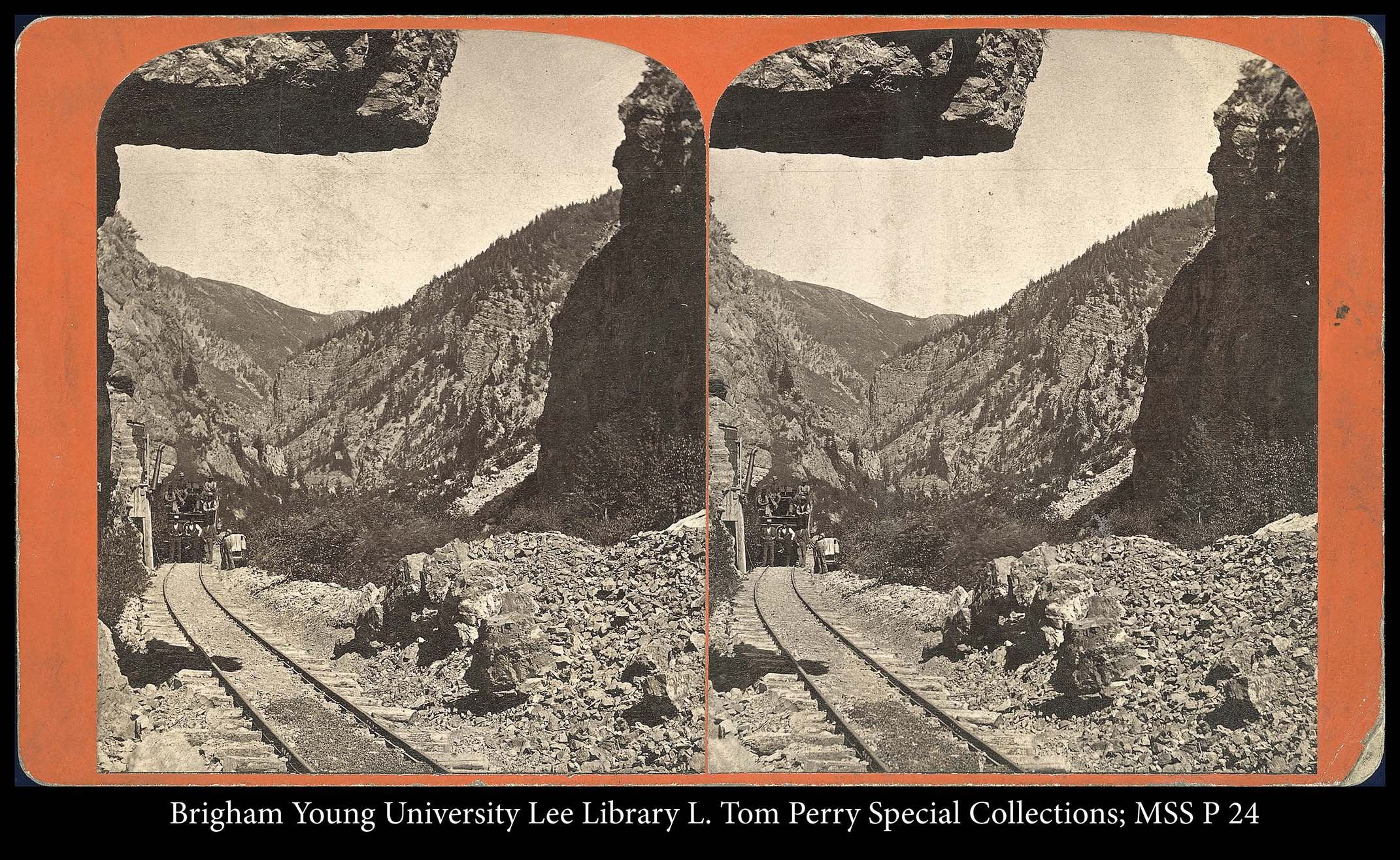
Stereograph of Utah's American Fork Railroad in the 1880s

In Utah, three foot gauge narrow-gauge railroads sprang up immediately after the completion of the Transcontinental Railroad on May 10, 1869. An 1870 article published by the Deseret News reported on the international success of the Ffestiniog and promoted narrow gauge as viable for the Utah territory. The Utah and Northern Railway connected the fertile Mormon Corridor with the mining camps near Butte, Montana with an extensive three-foot gauge system that lasted from 1871 until 1887. John Willard Young was a primary investor and owner of many of the territory's narrow gauge lines including the early Utah Northern; and competed with the established standard gauge Union Pacific Railroad and Central Pacific Railroad routes in the region. Robber baron Jay Gould would take control of the Utah and Northern by 1877 bringing it under the control of Union Pacific as the line was extended from Idaho to Montana. The American Fork Railroad was the first railroad to use a Mason Bogie locomotive an articulated design derived from the British Single Fairlie locomotive. Other narrow-gauge lines in Utah included the Wasatch & Jordan Valley (which hauled granite for the construction of the Church of Jesus Christ of Latter Day Saint's Salt Lake City temple) and the Utah & Pleasant Valley which tapped into the Pleasant Valley coal fields in north-central Utah. Both of these later railroads eventually formed part of the Denver & Rio Grande Western Railway a Utah-based extension of the Rio Grande network, which connected the Utah narrow gauge to Colorado. Other narrow gauge routes in Utah were later absorbed by the Union Pacific and its subsidiaries. Union Pacific made use of Ramsey car transfers throughout Utah and Idaho to account for gauge changes in the region.

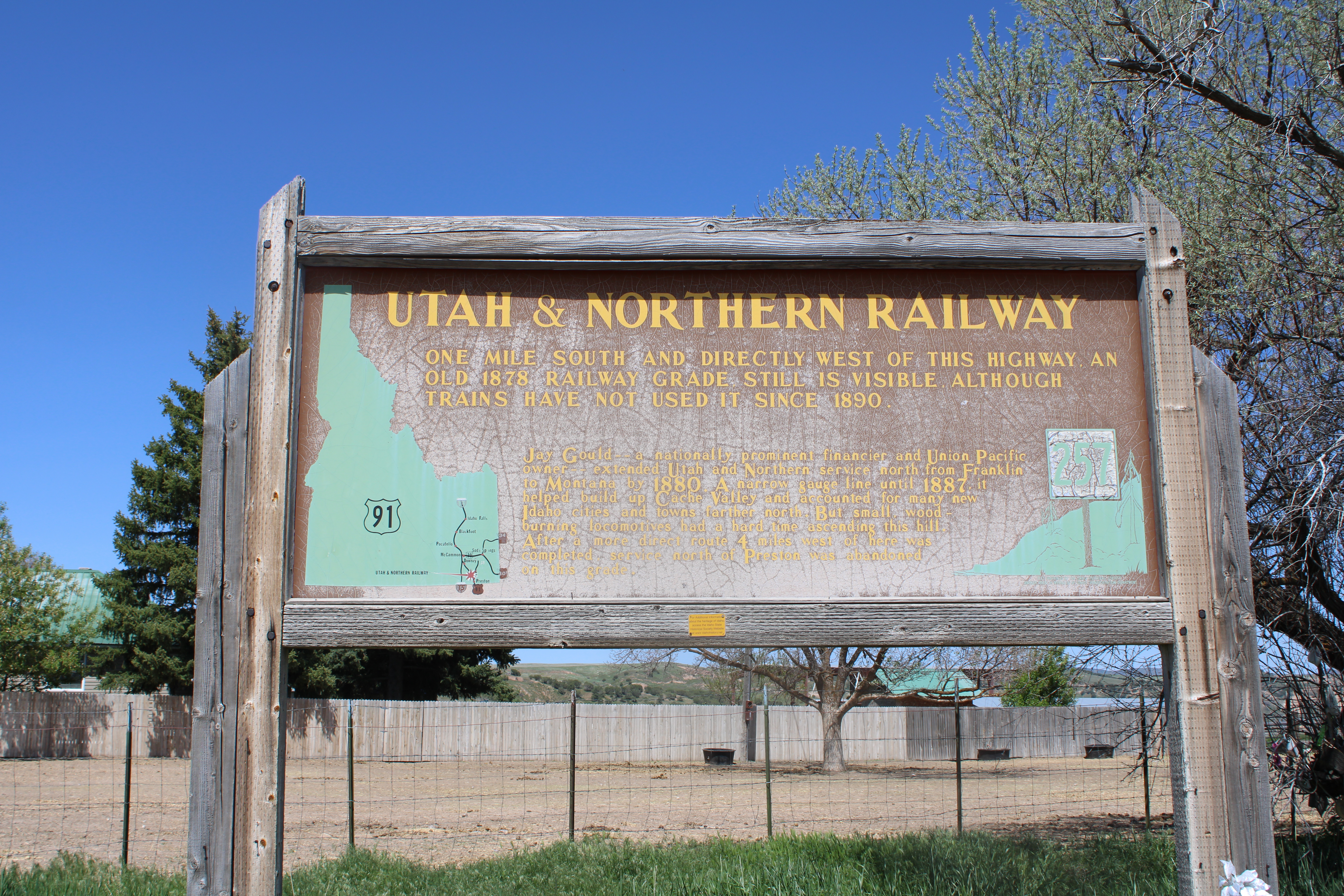
Utah and Northern Railway historical marker in Idaho.

Connections from the Utah narrow gauge railroads to those in Colorado was severed in 1890 when the then independent Rio Grande Western regauged their mainline from Ogden, Utah to Grande Junction. The Oregon Short Line Railroad regauged the former Utah and Northern in 1890 as well, isolating a few surviving narrow gauge lines to the immediate area around the Wasatch Front. The surviving pockets of narrow gauge in the Wasatch Front continued until the Oregon Short Line Railroad built a standard gauge route through Bauer, Utah in 1903; and the Little Cottonwood Transportation Co. (which operated leased track from the Rio Grande on the former Wasatch & Jordan Valley) ended service in 1925. Narrow gauge in the state continued with isolated lines serving mining regions such as the Eureka Hill Railway which served the Tintic mining district until 1937, and along the Utah-Colorado border on the Uintah Railway which operated until 1939. A two-foot gauge railroad in Utah, the Bingham Central Railway; which was mostly underground through the Mascote Tunnel, operated as a common carrier railroad when founded in 1908 before becoming a private operation which would close in the 1950s when replaced by a new tunnel.

Narrow gauge railroads served mining districts through central and eastern Nevada, such as the Eureka and Palisade Railroad and the Nevada Central Railroad. Some projects would have connected the Nevada narrow gauge network to the lines in Utah & Colorado, such as early projections for the Salt Lake, Sevier Valley & Pioche Railroad which would have connected with other narrow gauge lines at Pioche, Nevada; however none of these railroads were successful in reaching their initial goals. Locomotives from these central Nevada lines such as Eureka and Nevada Central #2 (renamed to the "Emma Nevada" by former owner and Disney animator Ward Kimball) survive to the present.

== West Coast ==
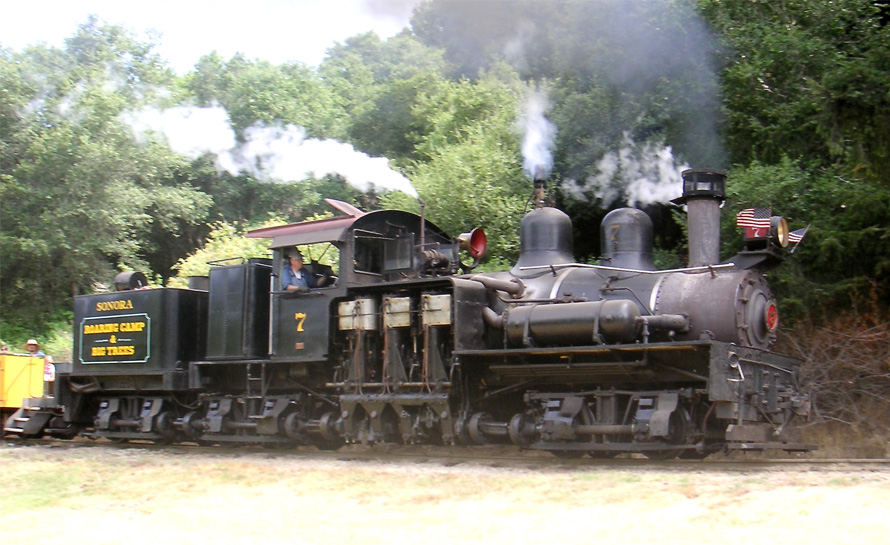
Shay geared locomotive at the Roaring Camp and Big Trees Narrow Gauge Railroad

The Southern Pacific operated several 3 ft (914 mm) gauge railroads, including the former Carson and Colorado Railway and the former Nevada–California–Oregon Railway, running from Reno into southern Oregon. The Carson and Colorado had been built in 1880 by the Virginia and Truckee Railroad who as traffic was waning from the Comstock Lode, sought to tap into mining claims in California. Carson & Colorado would become part of the Southern Pacific in 1900, and narrow gauge would be operated as the Keeler Branch by the company until being fully abandoned in 1960.

California's independent 3 ft (914 mm) lines included the Pacific Coast Railway serving the Santa Maria Valley, the North Pacific Coast Railroad and South Pacific Coast Railroads extending northward and southward from San Francisco Bay. Narrow gauge railroads built at amusement parks in the state include the Disneyland Railroad and Ghost Town & Calico Railroad. The defunct Arcata and Mad River Railroad was 3 ft 9 1/2 in (1,156 mm) gauge.

Two small regional railways in the Pacific Northwest were the Ilwaco Railway and Navigation Co near Astoria, and the Sumpter Valley Railway near Baker City, Oregon. After abandonment, reconstruction of a portion of the Sumpter Valley as a heritage railway began in 1971 in McEwan; with rails returning to Sumpter in 1991; with the restored railroad operating 5.2 mi (8.4 km) of track between the two communities.

The San Francisco cable car system is 3 ft 6 in (1,067 mm) gauge as was the now defunct Los Angeles Railway and the San Diego Electric Railway.

== Alaska ==
Alaska is home to two surviving narrow gauge railroads. The last surviving commercial common carrier narrow-gauge railroad in the United States was the White Pass and Yukon Route connecting Skagway, Alaska and Whitehorse, Yukon Territory. It ended common carrier service in 1982, but has since been partially reopened as a tourist railway.

The Second is in the interior of Alaska, in Fairbanks. A narrow gauge railroad known as the Tanana Valley Railroad, was bought by the Alaska Railroad in 1930, when the transition of narrow gauge to standard gauge happened. Today, the Tanana Valley Railroad steam locomotive Engine No. 1 is still operated by the Friends of the Tanana Valley Railroad and housed in the Tanana Valley Railroad Museum which is open year-round. The steam locomotive is taken out and fired up during the summer on a scheduled basis.

== Hawaii ==
Hawaii boasted an extensive network of not only narrow-gauge sugar-cane railways, but common carriers such as the Hawaii Consolidated Railway (which was standard gauge), Ahukini Terminal & Railway Company, Koolau Railway company, Kahului Railroad, and the Oahu Railway and Land Company. The Oahu Railway and Land Company was the largest narrow-gauge class-one common-carrier railway in the US (at the time of its dissolution in 1947), and the only US narrow-gauge railroad to use signals. The OR&L used Automatic Block Signals, or ABS on their double track mainline between Honolulu and Waipahu, a total of 12.9 miles (20.8 km), and had signals on a branch line for another nine miles (14 km). The section of track from Honolulu to Waipahu saw upwards of eighty trains a day, making it not only one of the busiest narrow-gauge main lines in the U.S., but one of the busiest mainlines in the world.

== Other applications of narrow gauge in the U.S. ==
There were also numerous narrow-gauge logging railroads in Pennsylvania and West Virginia who operated mostly with geared locomotives such as Shays, Climaxes, and Heislers.

Many narrow-gauge lines were private carriers serving particular industries. One major industry that made extensive use of 3 ft (914 mm) gauge railroads was the logging industry, especially in the West. Although most of these lines closed by the 1950s, one notable later survivor was West Side Lumber Company railway which continued using 3 ft (914 mm) gauge geared steam locomotives until 1968.

There is one narrow-gauge industrial railroad still in commercial operation in the United States, the US Gypsum operation in Plaster City, California, which uses a number of Montreal Locomotive Works locomotives obtained from the White Pass after its 1982 closure. Temporary narrow-gauge railways are commonly built to support large tunneling and mining operations.

The famous San Francisco cable car system has a gauge of 3 ft 6 in (1,067 mm), as did the street cars on the former Los Angeles street railway.

Rail haulage has been very important in the mining industry. By 1922, 80 percent of all new coal mines in the United States were being developed using 3 ft 6 in (1,067 mm) (42 inch) gauge trackage, and the American Mining Congress recommended this as a standard gauge for coal mines, using a 42-inch (1,067 mm) wheelbase and automatic couplers centered 10 inches (254 mm) above the rail.

The Washington Metro system in the Washington, D.C. metropolitan area has a gauge of 4 ft 8 1/4 in (1,429 mm), which is 1/4" or 6mm closer than standard gauge and not considered narrow gauge in the traditional sense and is within the tolerance of standard gauge.

== U.S. common-carrier narrow gauges in the twentieth century ==
Thousands of narrow-gauge railroads were built or projected in the U.S. The following list includes those common-carrier narrow-gauge railroads which operated into the twentieth century. Note: this list intentionally excludes tourist railroads, amusement parks, loggers, and other non-common carriers.

List of narrow-gauge railroads in the United States (all 3 ft / 914 mm gauge unless stated)
Railroad	State	Start year	End year	Notes
Arcata and Mad River Railroad	California	1854	1983	3 ft 9 1/2 in (1,156 mm) gauge, converted to 4 ft 8 1/2 in (1,435 mm) standard gauge
Altoona and Beech Creek Railroad	Pennsylvania	1891	1916	converted to standard gauge
Anniston and Atlantic Railroad	Alabama	1884	1890	converted to standard gauge
Arizona and New Mexico Railway	Arizona, New Mexico	1883	1901	converted to standard gauge
Arizona Narrow Gauge Railroad, later Tucson, Globe and Northwestern Railroad	Arizona	1886	1894	
Arkansas Central Railway, later Arkansas Midland Railroad	Arkansas	1872	1887	3 ft 6 in (1,067 mm) gauge until 1883, converted to standard gauge
Batesville and Brinkley Railroad	Arkansas	1882	1888	converted to standard gauge
Bellevue and Cascade Railroad	Iowa	1880	1936	
Bingham Canyon & Camp Floyd	Utah	1872	1881	Sold to D&RG in 1881, standard gauged 1883
Boston, Revere Beach and Lynn Railroad	Massachusetts	1875	1940	
Bradford, Bordell and Kinzua Railroad, later Buffalo, Bradford and Kane Railroad	Pennsylvania	1880	1906	
Bridgton and Saco River Railroad, later Bridgton and Harrison Railway	Maine	1883	1941	2 ft (610 mm) gauge
Carson and Colorado Railroad, later Carson and Colorado Railway, then Nevada and California Railway, then Southern Pacific	California, Nevada	1881	1960	part conversion to standard gauge
Catskill and Tannersville Railway	New York	1899	1918	
Catskill Mountain Railroad, later Catskill Mountain Railway	New York	1882	1918	
Cincinnati, Georgetown and Portsmouth Railroad	Ohio	1877	1902	converted to standard gauge, later abandoned. Date of conversion listed.
Colorado Central Railroad, later Colorado and Southern Railway	Colorado	1872	1941	
Colorado and Southern Railway	Colorado	1898	1943	Formed from Colorado Central Railroad and the Denver, South Park and Pacific Railway
Coronado Railroad	Arizona	1879	1932	20 in (508 mm) gauge, later 3 ft (914 mm) gauge
Cotton Plant Railroad	Arkansas	1879	1882	3 ft 6 in (1,067 mm) gauge until 1881, to Batesville and Brinkley Railroad
Crescent Tramway	Utah	1883	1900	2 ft 6 in (762 mm) gauge
Denver and Rio Grande Western Railway	Colorado, Utah, New Mexico	1871	1969	Utah portion standard gauged 1883
Durango and Silverton Narrow Gauge Railroad	Colorado	1881	Still operating	
Eagles Mere Railroad	Pennsylvania	1892	1928	
East and West Railroad of Alabama	Alabama, Georgia	1871	1890	converted to standard gauge
East Broad Top Railroad and Coal Company	Pennsylvania	1873	1956	
East Tennessee and Western North Carolina Railroad	Tennessee, North Carolina	1881	1950	
Eureka and Palisade Railroad	Nevada	1874	1938	
Farmville and Powhatan Railroad, later Tidewater and Western Railroad	Virginia	1882	1917	
Florence and Cripple Creek Railroad	Colorado	1894	1915	
Franklin and Megantic Railroad, later Sandy River and Rangeley Lakes Railroad	Maine	1884	1908	2 ft (610 mm) gauge
Fulton County Narrow Gauge Railway	Illinois	1880	1905	converted to standard gauge
Golovin Bay Railroad	Alaska	1902	1906	
Hot Springs Branch Railroad	Arkansas	1875	1889	converted to standard gauge
Kane and Elk Railroad	Pennsylvania	1896	1911	
Kennebec Central Railroad	Maine	1890	1929	2 ft (610 mm) gauge
Lancaster, Oxford and Southern Railroad	Pennsylvania	1873	1919	
Lawndale Railway and Industrial Company	North Carolina	1899	1945	
Lewisburg and Buffalo Valley Railroad	Pennsylvania	1897	1906	
Linville River Railway	North Carolina	1899	1913	sold to East Tennessee and Western North Carolina Railroad
Little Cottonwood Transportation Company	Utah	1910	1925	
Magma Arizona Railroad	Arizona	1914	1923	converted to standard gauge
Maryland Central Railroad, later Baltimore and Lehigh Railroad	Maryland, Pennsylvania	1882	1900	converted to standard gauge; became Maryland and Pennsylvania Railroad
Monson Railroad	Maine	1883	1943	2 ft (610 mm) gauge
Montgomery Southern Railway	Alabama	1882	1889	converted to standard gauge
Montrose Railway	Pennsylvania	1872	1903	converted to standard gauge
Morenci Southern Railway	Arizona	1899	1932	
Mount Gretna Narrow Gauge Railway	Pennsylvania	1889	1915	2 ft (610 mm) gauge
Nantucket Railroad	Massachusetts	1881	1917	
Nevada and Oregon Railroad, later Nevada and California Railroad, then Nevada-California-Oregon Railway, then Southern Pacific	Nevada, California, Oregon	1882	1929	converted to standard gauge
Nevada Central Railway	Nevada	1880	1938	
Nevada County Narrow Gauge Railroad	California	1876	1942	
Nevada Short Line Railway	Nevada	1913	1918	
New Berlin and Winfield Railroad	Pennsylvania	1905	1916	
Newport and Shermans Valley Railroad	Pennsylvania	1891	1934	
North Pacific Coast Railroad, later Northwestern Pacific Railroad	California	1873	1930	
Oahu Railway and Land Company	Hawaii	1889	1947	
Ohio River and Western Railway	Ohio	1877	1931	
Oregonian Railway	Oregon	1878	1893	to Southern Pacific; converted to standard gauge
Otis Elevating Railway, later Otis Railway	New York	1892	1918	Funicular railway
Pacific Coast Railway	California	1873	1941	
Pajaro Valley Consolidated Railroad	California	1890	1929	
Phillips and Rangeley Railroad, later Sandy River and Rangeley Lakes Railroad	Maine	1890	1908	2 ft (610 mm) gauge
Pioche Pacific Transportation Company	Nevada	1891	1948	
Pittsburgh and Castle Shannon Railroad	Pennsylvania	1871	1909	3 ft 4 in (1,016 mm) gauge
Pittsburgh and Western Railroad	Pennsylvania	1878	1911	
Potomac, Fredericksburg and Piedmont Railroad	Virginia	1876	1926	
Rio Grande Southern Railroad	Colorado	1892	1951	
Sandy River Railroad, later Sandy River and Rangeley Lakes Railroad	Maine	1879	1908	2 ft (610 mm) gauge
Sandy River and Rangeley Lakes Railroad	Maine	1908	1935	2 ft (610 mm) gauge, portion operating as a heritage railroad.
Shannon-Arizona Railway	Arizona	1910	1932	
South Pacific Coast Railroad	California	1878	1940	
Sumpter Valley Railway	Oregon	1891	1947	
Susquehanna and Eagles Mere Railroad	Pennsylvania	1902	1917	
Talladega and Coosa Valley Railroad	Alabama	1884	1889	converted to standard gauge
Tanana Valley Railroad	Alaska	1904	1930	
Tionesta Valley Railroad	Pennsylvania	1882	1941	
Seaboard Railway of Alabama, later Tombigbee and Northern Railway	Alabama	1891	1904	converted to standard gauge
Tonawanda Valley & Cuba Railroad	New York	1881	1894	Converted in 1896, Operates as A&A R.R. today
Tonopah Railroad	Nevada	1904	1905	converted to standard gauge
Tuscarora Valley Railroad	Pennsylvania	1893	1934	
Tuskegee Railroad	Alabama	1871	1963	
Uintah Railway	Colorado, Utah	1904	1939	
United Verde and Pacific Railway	Arizona	1894	1920	
Utah & Pleasant Valley	Utah	1875	1881	
Wasatch & Jordan Valley	Utah	1872	1879	Merged with Bingham Canyon & Camp Floyd, standard gauged 1883
Waynesburg and Washington Railroad	Pennsylvania	1877	1944	converted to standard gauge
White Pass & Yukon Route	Alaska	1898	Still operating - tourism only	
Wild Goose Railroad, later Nome Arctic Railroad, then Seward Peninsula Railroad	Alaska	1900	1955	
Wiscasset and Quebec Railroad, later Wiscasset, Waterville and Farmington Railway	Maine	1895	1933	2 ft (610 mm) gauge, portion operating as a heritage railroad

== Narrow-gauge railroad displays ==
Some cars and trains from the Maine two-footers are now on display at the Maine Narrow Gauge Railroad Museum in Portland, Maine.

In 1957, the East Tennessee and Western North Carolina Railroad was revived as a tourist attraction under the common name, Tweetsie Railroad. It currently runs a three-mile (5 km) route near Blowing Rock, North Carolina. Similarly, the East Broad Top Railroad was revived in 1960 and runs on three miles of original 1873 trackage.

Significant remnants of the Colorado system remain as tourist attractions which run in the summer, including the Cumbres and Toltec Scenic Railroad running between Antonito, CO in the San Luis Valley and Chama, NM, and the Durango and Silverton Narrow Gauge Railroad running between its namesake towns of Durango and Silverton in the San Juan Mountains. Another line is the Georgetown Loop Railroad between Georgetown, Colorado and Silver Plume, Colorado in central Colorado. Much equipment from the Colorado narrow gauges is on display at the Colorado Railroad Museum in Golden, Colorado. Many pieces of the D&RGW's narrow-gauge equipment were sold off to various other companies upon its abandonment; the Ghost Town & Calico Railroad, a heritage railroad at Knott's Berry Farm in California, operates passenger service daily with two Class C-19 Consolidation (2–8–0) locomotives hauling preserved coaches along with a famed Galloping Goose RGS #3. D&RGW 223, a C-16 steam locomotive, is undergoing restoration at the Utah State Railroad Museum in Ogden, Utah.

Much of the equipment from the Westside Lumber Co. found its way to tourist lines, including the Roaring Camp & Big Trees Narrow Gauge Railroad and Yosemite Mountain Sugar Pine Railroad in California and the Midwest Central Railroad in Iowa. Additional equipment from the west coast narrow gauges is displayed at the Nevada County Narrow Gauge RR Museum, in Nevada City, CA, Laws Depot Museum, and at the Grizzly Flats Railroad (donated to Southern California Railway Museum after Ward Kimball's death) along with a Westside Lumber caboose.

The Huckleberry Railroad in Flint, Michigan began operating in 1976 using a part of an old Flint & Pere Marquette Railroad branch line. The Flint & Pere Marquette Railroad extended the branch line from Flint to Otter Lake in the late 1800s. It later came to be known as the Otter Lake Branch. Eventually the track was extended by another 4.5 miles from Otter Lake to Fostoria, for a total of 19.5 miles from Flint to Fostoria. The Pere Marquette Railway abandoned the Flint to Fostoria branch line in 1932. The Huckleberry Railroad began operations in 1976 on the remaining section of the Flint to Fostoria line when the Genesee County Parks and Recreation Commission purchased the line and opened Crossroads Village & Huckleberry Railroad as a historical tourist attraction.

Meanwhile, in Hawaii, the Hawaiian Railway Society on the island of Oahu operates on 6 miles of remaining Oahu Railway and Land Company trackage, from the yard in Ewa to Nanakuli. More tracks remain past a burned down bridge, and past the society in Ewa, totaling to 12 miles of remaining OR&L Right of way. On Maui, the Lahaina, Kaanapali and Pacific Railroad operates on 6 miles of tracks through former sugar plantation land. This railroad, also known as the "Sugar Cane Train", is the only 3-foot railroad in Hawaii to operate steam locomotives. On Kauai, two narrow-gauge railroads still operate. The 3-foot railroad, the Kauai Plantation Railway operates on a 3-mile loop through the Kilohana Estate and Plantation. The second narrow-gauge railroad on Kauai is a 30-inch railway, the Grove Farm Sugar Plantation Museum. They operate many different locomotives, from steam to diesel, on a mile loop through parts of the former Lihue Plantation.

== See also ==
- 3 ft 6 in gauge railroads in the United States
- 3 ft gauge railroads in the United States
- 2 ft 6 in gauge railroads in the United States
- 2 ft gauge railroads in the United States
- British narrow-gauge railways
- List of narrow-gauge railways in Ireland
