= Altoona and Beech Creek Railroad =

Defunct narrow-gauge railroad in Pennsylvania

Map of the Altoona and Beech Creek Railroad

The Altoona and Beech Creek Railroad was a 3 ft (914 mm) narrow gauge railroad in Pennsylvania that operated during the late nineteenth and early twentieth centuries. It carried passenger traffic from the vicinity of Altoona to Wopsononock and coal and timber from Wopsononock and Dougherty to Altoona.

Originally constructed to facilitate the development of coal mines and resorts atop the Allegheny Plateau, it became involved in a complicated and ultimately unsuccessful scheme to break the Pennsylvania Railroad's control over the Clearfield Coalfield.

Never very profitable, it went through several reorganizations, the last in 1913. Conversion to 4 ft 8 1/2 in (1,435 mm) standard gauge in 1916 did not improve the situation, and the railroad was abandoned in 1919.

== Charter and construction ==
Altoona and Wopsononock Railroad

Overview
- Headquarters: Altoona, Pennsylvania
- Locale: Blair County, Pennsylvania
- Dates of operation: 1891–1892
- Successor: Altoona, Clearfield and Northern Railroad

Technical
- Track gauge: 3 ft (914 mm)

The railroad was chartered on May 27, 1890, as the Altoona and Wopsononock Railroad. It was surveyed from Juniata, a northern suburb of Altoona, up Spring Run, and climbed a circuitous, twisting route up the Allegheny Front through Juniata Gap, to terminate at the newly established resort town of Wopsononock. By the time the first annual meeting of the stockholders was held on January 13, 1891, 5 miles (8.0 km) of the road had been completed as a 3 ft (914 mm) narrow gauge line. The board ultimately decided to complete the remaining 4 miles (6.4 km) to the same gauge. Frank G. Patterson, an Altoona attorney, was elected president, and William L. Shellenberger vice-president.

Rails were finished to the top of the Alleghenies on June 6, and the first train arrived in Wopsononock on June 11. The railroad was formally opened on July 2, 1891. An extension to Dougherty, 5 miles (8.0 km) beyond Wopsononock, was begun on September 31, in order to serve mines of the newly formed Richland Coal Company, headed by Shellenberger. Patterson was also involved in the coal company, serving as its secretary.

== Extension and legal battle ==
Altoona, Clearfield and Northern Railroad
Overview
- Headquarters: Altoona, Pennsylvania
- Locale: Pennsylvania
- Dates of operation: 1892–1897
- Successor: Altoona and Beech Creek Railroad

Technical
- Track gauge: 3 ft (914 mm)

Patterson wished to extend the line to Dougherty, and a further 12 miles (19 km) to Coalport on Clearfield Creek. To finance the extension, the shareholders, in November 1891, authorized a $60,000 mortgage on the property, and allowed Patterson to issue himself 600 additional shares of stock. He did so, but never paid the money due for them to the company's treasury.

On January 22, 1892, the railroad's name was changed to the Altoona, Clearfield and Northern Railroad to reflect the projected extension, which was built that year as far as Dougherty. However, a struggle for control of the railroad now ensued.

Patterson had agreed to sell 60% of the company's stock to James Kerr, who was expected in turn to sell the stock to the Pennsylvania Railroad, at whose Juniata station the line terminated. However, before Patterson could transfer the stock to Kerr, several other directors of the railroad, including Shellenberger, contracted to sell a majority interest in the railroad to Samuel P. Langdon. Langdon controlled the Altoona and Philipsburg Connecting Railroad, a short line in the Philipsburg area whose southern end would reach Ramey, about 17 miles (27 km) from Dougherty, in 1894. He intended to connect the two railroads and use the AC&N to enter Altoona.

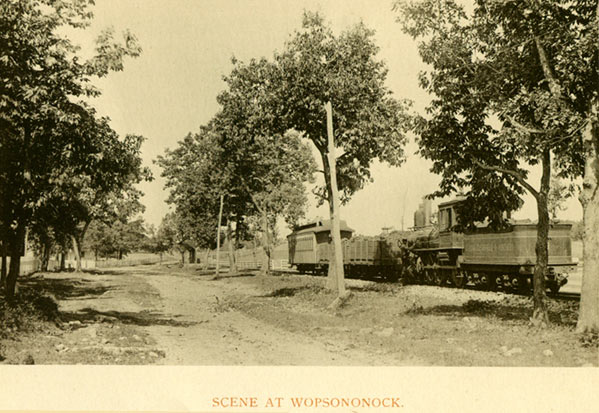
Altoona, Clearfield and Northern train at Wopsononock, ready to back down the mountain.

Patterson and Langdon both claimed to control a majority of the company's stock, and in February 1893, rival boards of directors were elected by stockholders loyal to those two figures. The issue of 600 shares to Patterson, authorized in 1891, turned the issue, and its validity was ultimately upheld by the Supreme Court of Pennsylvania and Patterson's board of directors ordered seated. Langdon promptly petitioned for a receivership, and was appointed joint receiver with Patterson. Patterson, however, took most of the responsibility for operations. He was responsible for having wyes installed at Wopsononock and Juniata in late 1894 so that the railroad's engines did not have to back down the mountain. The co-receivership was lifted on July 6, 1896, and Patterson took full control of the railroad again. However, the railroad failed to cover its operating expenses shortly thereafter, and Patterson was re-appointed receiver on September 28, 1896. On February 29, 1897, it was sold under foreclosure to William L. Shellenberger, on behalf of the bondholders—the group which had allied with Langdon. On March 17, 1897, it was reorganized as the Altoona and Beech Creek Railroad.

Altoona and Beech Creek Railroad
Overview
- Headquarters: Altoona, Pennsylvania
- Locale: Pennsylvania
- Dates of operation: 1897–1910
- Successor: Altoona Northern Railroad

Technical
- Track gauge: 3 ft (914 mm)

Shellenberger and his fellow bondholders had good reason to seek control of the railroad. After their failure to deliver control of the road to Langdon, he brought suit against them. In exchange for his dropping the suit, they agreed to lease the Altoona and Beech Creek to the Pittsburgh, Johnstown, Ebensburg and Eastern Railroad, a holding company formed by Langdon, on highly favorable terms. The new company was to operate the Altoona & Philipsburg Connecting, planning to convert to standard gauge and extend the two railroads to a junction at East Frugality, near Dougherty. The PJE&E would be extended further south through Ebensburg and then down to the Baltimore and Ohio Railroad at Johnstown. During this period, the line was known as the "Altoona Division" of the PJE&E. On December 17, 1898, Langdon chartered the Altoona and Beech Creek Terminal Railroad, which would extend the Altoona and Beech Creek from Juniata to a new terminal at 9th Street and 15th Avenue in Altoona. However, he was unable to carry out these plans, and his lease was invalidated on March 27, 1900. Through appeals and legal maneuvers, Langdon was able to hold out until December 27, 1901, when the Sheriff of Blair County ejected the PJE&E employees and returned the Altoona and Beech Creek to its stockholders. The Altoona and Beech Creek Terminal was dissolved in 1905–6.

The Altoona and Beech Creek reported itself in the Official Guide of 1903 as having been extended to Fallentimber, 5 miles (8.0 km) beyond Dougherty. However, it does not appear that this extension was, in fact, built. By 1909, the railroad had built two short branches of 1.4 miles (2.3 km) each at the Juniata end of the line. The Kipple Branch left the main line near Broadway and Penn Avenue, Juniata, and circled around to the north, serving a few local industries and reaching the PRR's main line at Juniata Junction, near 2nd Avenue and 10th Street. The Fairview Branch ran southwest from a wye near 25th Avenue and Broadway to end in the Fairview neighborhood of Altoona, at 23rd Avenue and 10th Street.

Altoona, Juniata and Northern Railway
Overview
- Headquarters: Altoona, Pennsylvania
- Locale: Pennsylvania
- Dates of operation: 1910–1913
- Successor: Altoona Northern Railroad

Technical
- Track gauge: 3 ft (914 mm)

Despite the battle waged for possession of it, the railroad had not been very profitable. Passenger traffic to Wopsononock had been declining, and coal traffic from Dougherty was rather limited. Shellenberger installed a rock crusher atop the mountain, which also provided revenue. A major forest fire destroyed both the Wopsononock Hotel and the coal tipple at Dougherty on April 30, 1903. When the railroad became insolvent again, Shellenberger was appointed receiver on June 4, 1909. It was once more sold under foreclosure on April 30, 1910, to H.A. Davis, and reorganized as the Altoona, Juniata and Northern Railway.

== Conversion and abandonment ==
Altoona Northern Railroad
Overview
- Headquarters: Altoona, Pennsylvania
- Locale: Pennsylvania
- Dates of operation: 1913–1919
- Successor: abandoned

Technical
- Track gauge: 4 ft 8 1/2 in (1,435 mm) standard gauge
- Previous gauge: originally 3 ft (914 mm) gauge

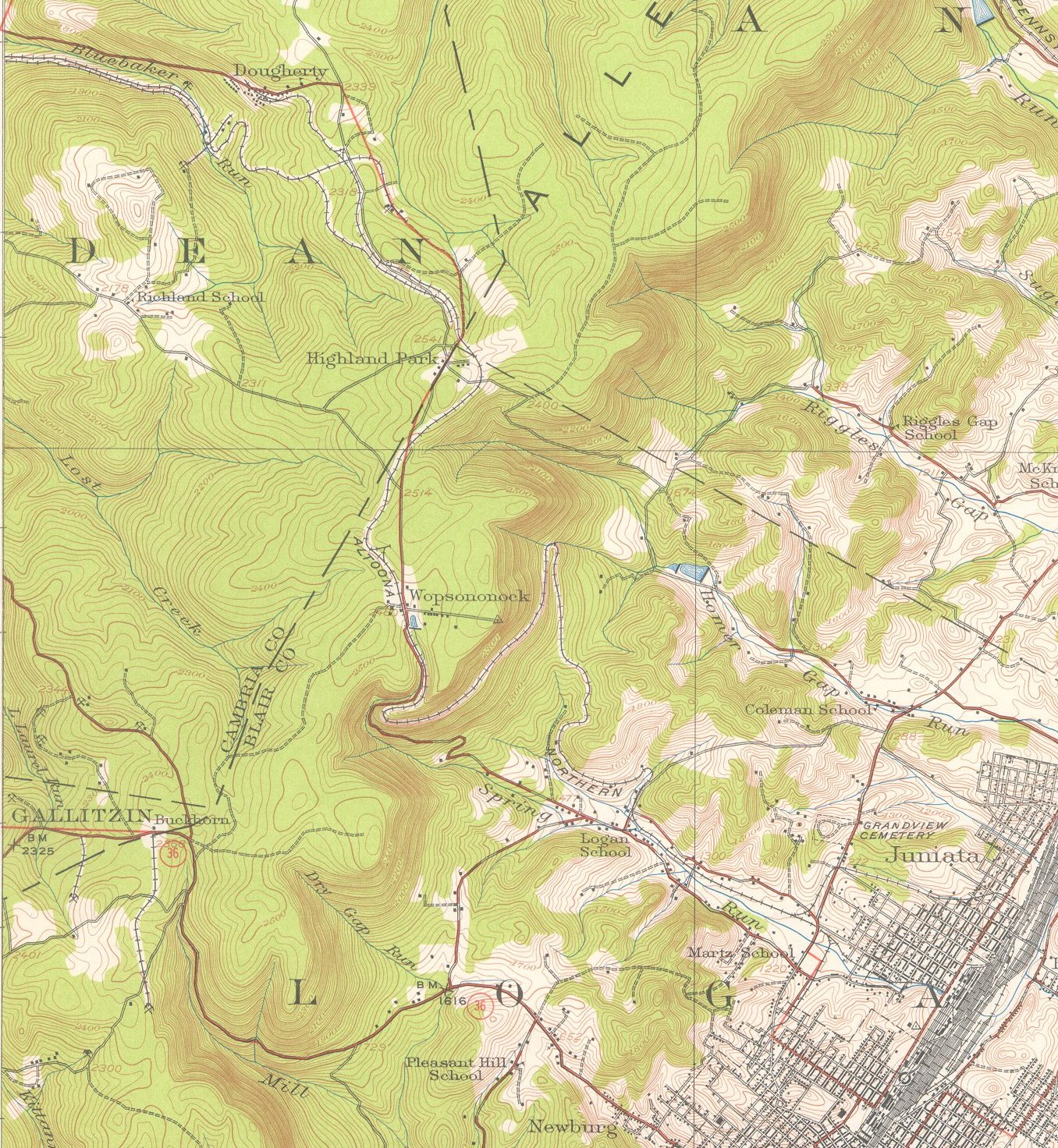
Topographic map showing the railroad's route in 1920.

Andrew Kepple, one of the original Altoona & Wopsononock directors, was elected president of the newly organized company. The board remained largely unchanged, although Shellenberger finally severed his association with the railroad. It remained unprofitable, and Davis, in turn, sold the line to Sigmund Morris, of Altoona. Morris had incorporated the Altoona Northern Railroad on November 7, 1912, to acquire the line, and the Altoona, Juniata and Northern was merged into it on January 16, 1913. Morris planned to convert the railroad to 4 ft 8 1/2 in (1,435 mm) standard gauge, electrify it to make it an interurban, and extend it to connect with the Beech Creek Railroad (a subsidiary of the New York Central Railroad) at Patton. However, Morris was unable to execute these plans. A group of New York City investors took over the railroad about 1916. They converted the railroad to standard gauge, operating initially with ex-Pennsylvania Railroad 2-6-0s, but replacing them with Heislers when the 2-6-0s were found to be unsuitable for the track.

The conversion failed to make the railroad pay, and the company went into receivership again on August 8, 1918. The last passenger train was operated on July 16, 1919, and the last coal train on July 30. Negotiations with the bondholders to resume service were not successful, and the rails were removed in 1921.

== Equipment ==
=== Locomotives ===
The Altoona & Wopsononock initially owned two engines. #1 was a National 2-6-0, and #2 a Baldwin 4-4-0, both of which were purchased used from the Pittsburgh and Western Railroad. In 1892, the Altoona, Clearfield & Northern bought #3, a Baldwin 4-6-0. However, due to the depleted state of the railroad's finances, it was unable to pay for #3. Samuel Langdon forestalled legal proceedings by having the locomotive transferred to his United Collieries Co., which paid Baldwin in coal. Nothing is known of #4, if it ever existed. The Altoona & Beech Creek bought #5 and #6, both Baldwin 2-6-0s, in 1901, while still under Pittsburg, Johnstown, Ebensburg & Eastern control. After the PJE&E lost its lease on the railroad, litigation ensued over the ownership of #3; by the time the Supreme Court of Pennsylvania declared in favor of the A&BC in 1903, United Collieries had sold it to the Surry, Sussex and Southampton Railroad. #5 and #6 were sold to the Ohio River and Western Railroad and the Tacajo Sugar Company, respectively, when the railroad was converted to standard gauge in 1916.

The Altoona Northern initially purchased three ex-PRR 2-6-0s (built at Juniata Shops), numbered #101–103. They were found to be unsuitable for the light track and steep grades, and were sold in 1917. They were replaced by #104 and #105, new two-truck Heislers, and the railroad bought #106, a three-truck Heisler, in 1918. They were sold to various lumber companies when the railroad was abandoned.

=== Passenger and freight equipment ===
Details of the railroad's rolling stock are obscure. In 1891, it owned five passenger and three freight cars. In addition to the coaches that supported passenger runs to Wopsononock and Dougherty (fourteen trains per day during the 1899 season), the railroad had at least one parlor car and several Brill-built observation cars. Contemporary photographs show that the railroad built some of its own open-air cars for excursion service. Photographs taken after the destruction of the Wopsononock Hotel and the decline in passenger traffic show a number of gondola cars for coal traffic. The railroad continued to maintain a standard gauge gondola fleet in the last years of its existence.

== Stations ==
The following stations existed along the line, going from south to north:

Name	Notes
Juniata	Across from PRR's Juniata Shops
Coleman	
Ivyside	Site of an amusement park; now the Penn State Altoona campus
Gwin	
Parks	
Juniata Springs	The springs were reported to be a place for entertainment such as wading according to a July 1912 letter from Ruth Lockard Rupe.
Homer	
Wopsononock	Site of the Wopsononock Hotel, a popular resort
Richland	
Highland	
Walker
Dougherty	Site of coal mines

Scenic points along the road included Mule Shoe Curve, the trestles and cut at Sandy Gap Bend, and the high bluffs along the right-of-way at Butcher Knife Point.
