= Lawndale Railway and Industrial Company =

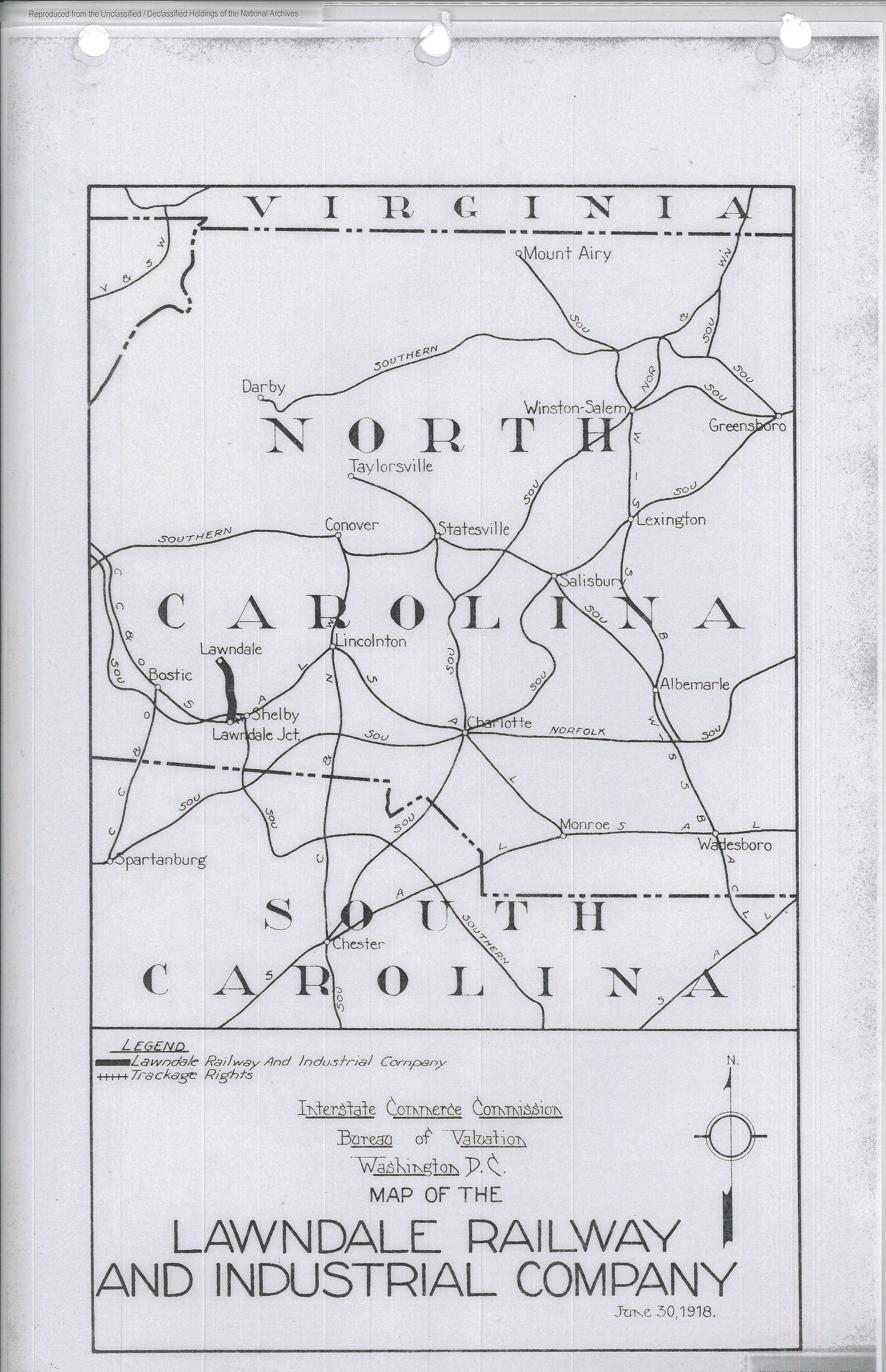
1918 map of the railroad

The Lawndale Railway and Industrial Company operated a 3 ft (914 mm) narrow gauge railroad from Shelby to Lawndale, North Carolina from 1899 to 1943. It served the Cleveland Cotton Mills in Shelby, as well as a cotton mill at Double Shoals, and also hauled agricultural products and supplies, coal, and general merchandise.
