= Eureka and Palisade Railroad =

Defunct railroad in Nevada, USA

Eureka & Palisade Railroad
Overview
- Headquarters: Palisade, Nevada
- Locale: Palisade - Eureka, Nevada
- Dates of operation: 1873–1938

Technical
- Track gauge: 3 ft (914 mm)

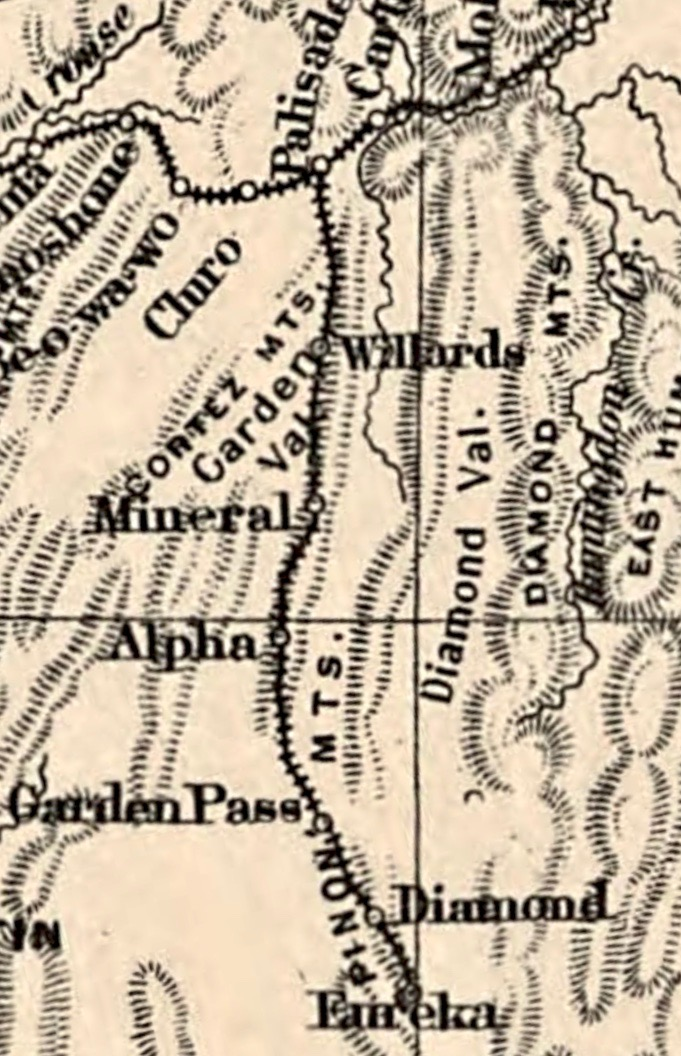
Eureka Nevada Railway route in 1883

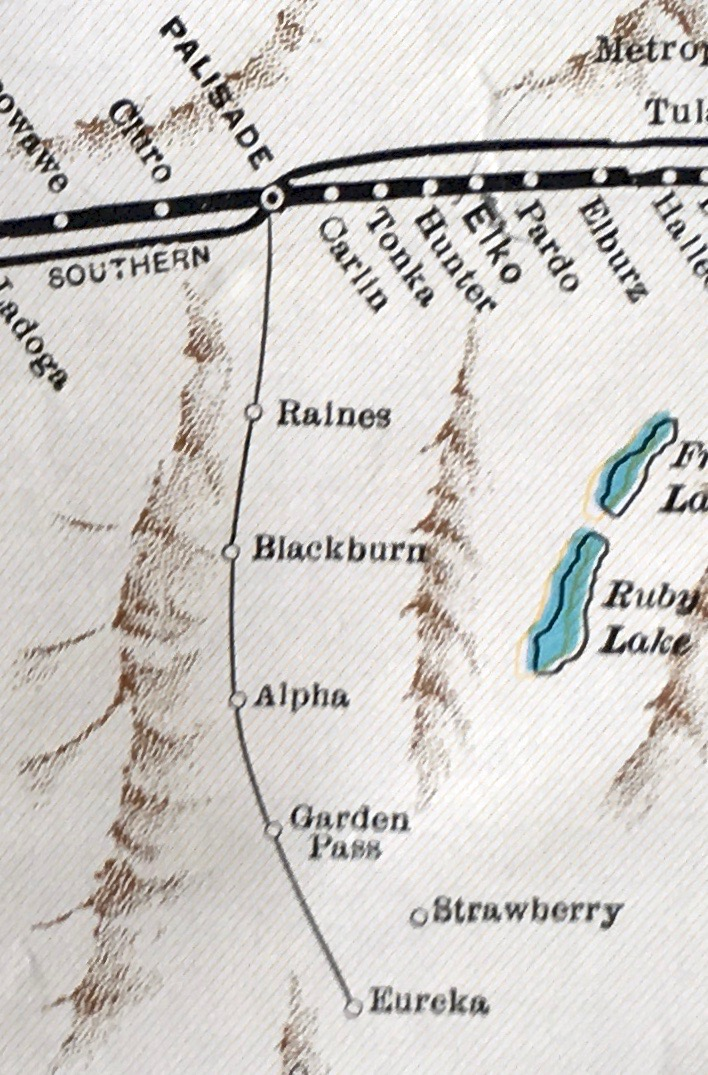
Route in 1931

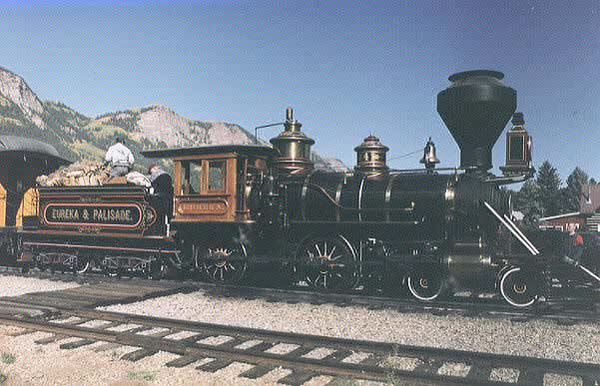
Eureka & Palisade #4, the "Eureka", still exists and has been carefully restored to operating condition by Daniel Markoff, a private collector in Nevada. Periodically he runs the engine for the public, typically on narrow-gauge trackage in Nevada, Colorado and New Mexico.

The Eureka and Palisade Railroad was a 3 ft (914 mm) narrow gauge railroad constructed in 1873-1875 between Palisade and Eureka, Nevada, a distance of approximately 85 miles (137 km). The railroad was constructed to connect Eureka, the center of a rich silver mining area, with the national railway network at Palisade. Later corporate reorganizations brought on by financial difficulties saw the line operated as the "Eureka and Palisade Railway" and the "Eureka-Nevada Railway."

As early as 1871, shortly after the completion of the first transcontinental railroad in 1869, and just a year after the original strike was made, people in Eureka could see the advantages of building a railroad to connect them with the Central Pacific Railroad transcontinental line. Ore had to be shipped to Salt Lake City for final refining, and getting it north to Palisade, Nevada (the nearest point on the Central Pacific) by wagon was very expensive - about 20 dollars per ton. To get mining supplies southbound, the rates were twice as high. Building a railroad would result in significantly lower freight rates.

The Eureka & Palisade Railroad was built in 1875 to carry silver-lead ore from Eureka, Nevada, to the Central Pacific Railroad (later Southern Pacific Railroad) trunk line that ran through Palisade. Nevertheless, despite the determined and colorful management style of John Sexton, the line succumbed to the effects of flood, fire, competing road traffic, and dwindling amounts of ore extracted in Eureka. The rails and rolling stock of the railroad were removed in 1938.

The Eureka, one of the railroad's only surviving steam locomotives, is listed on the United States National Register of Historic Places.

Eureka-Nevada Railway's second locomotive number 12 is preserved at the Nevada State Railroad Museum Boulder City. Another locomotive that has survived is #7, a 2-6-2 Prairie named Pufferbilly that was built in 1915 by the H.K. Porter Company. It is privately owned by Gary Norton and can be seen at Silverwood Theme Park in Athol, Idaho where it runs daily during theme park operation.

== Steam Locomotives ==
#	Builder	SN	Type	Built	Acq	Ret	Disposition	Notes
1	Mason Machine Works	461	0-4-4T	1872	1873	1875	Sold to Nevada Central #2 in 1879.	First Mason Bogie locomotive, built for stock, sold to the American Fork Railroad #1 of Utah in 1873. Purchased from that road by the E&P. Renumbered on the NC to #3 in 1881. Sold in 1882 for use on the Utah & Northern. Gone by 1886. See link below.
2	Baldwin Locomotive Works	3638	2-6-0	8/1874	1874	1881	Sold to Bodie & Benton #3	Scrapped by the B&B when the road closed in 1918.
3	Baldwin Locomotive Works	3701	2-6-0	3/1875	1875	1918	Scrapped	
4	Baldwin Locomotive Works	3763	4-4-0	7/1875	1875	1896	Sold to Hobart Estate #5	Sold to Warner Brothers in 1939. Currently privately owned in Las Vegas, Nevada. Preserved in operational condition.
5	Baldwin Locomotive Works	3826	4-4-0	1/1876	1876	Off roster by 1913.	Scrapped?	Renumbered to 3 in 1912.
5	Brooks Locomotive Works	530	2-6-0	1881	1912	1919	Rebuilt	Renumbered 9 after rebuild. Originally Utah & Northern #31, renumbered to 88 in 1885. Sold between 1890 and 1892 to Sumpter Valley #5. Acquired from the SV in 1912.
6	Baldwin Locomotive Works	4375	2-6-0	7/1878	1878	Unknown	Scrapped?	Retained by the Eureka-Nevada Railroad
7	Baldwin Locomotive Works	6662	4-4-0	2/1883	1883	Unknown	Scrapped?	Retained by the Eureka-Nevada Railroad
7	H. K. Porter	5720	2-6-2	8/1915	1915	1939	Sold	Preserved. Currently operational at the Silverwood Theme Park in Athol, Idaho.
8	Baldwin Locomotive Works	28806	2-8-0	1906	1906	1912	Sold to Sumpter Valley #14	
8	H. K. Porter	5637	2-4-4T	3/1915	1915	1926	Rebuilt to 2-6-0	
8	H. K. Porter	Rebuild	2-6-0	3/1915	1926	1927	Burned in Engine House Fire, later scrapped. Previously engine #8.	
9	Baldwin Locomotive Works	5285	4-4-0	1880	1907	1912	Sold to Sumpter Valley Railway #10	Built as Carson and Colorado Railway #1 "Candelaria". Purchased from that road by the E&P.
9	Brooks Locomotive Works	Rebuild	2-6-0	1881	1919	1927	Burned in Engine House Fire, later scrapped. Previously engine #5.	
10	Baldwin Locomotive Works	11075	2-8-0	1890	1910	1912	Sold to Sumpter Valley #15	Built for the Alberta Coal & Railway Company #7. Derailed soon after arrival. Left in place until 1912.
10	H. K. Porter	5893	2-6-4t	1916	1916	1926	Rebuilt to 2–6–0.	
10	H. K. Porter	Rebuild	2-6-0	1916	1926	1927	Burned in Engine House Fire	later scrapped. Previously engine #10.
10	Baldwin Locomotive Works	24271	2-8-0	5/1904	1927	1938	Scrapped?	Originally Uintah #10
11	H. K. Porter	6515	2-8-0	6/1920	1920	1936	Later Scrapped	
12	Vulcan Iron Works	3322	2-8-0	3/1923	1923	1927	Burned in Engine House Fire	Later Scrapped
12	Baldwin Locomotive Works	14771	2-8-0	3/1896	1937	1938	Sold	Originally built as Florence & Cripple Creek #10. Became Cripple Creek & Colorado Springs #36 in 1915. Sold in 1917 to Uintah #12. Purchased from Uintah. Preserved. Currently on display at the Nevada State Railroad Museum Boulder City.
14	Baldwin Locomotive Works	Unknown	2-6-0	1882	1912			Not known if ever delivered to the Railroad.
15	Baldwin Locomotive Works	4982	4-4-0	1/1880	1912	Unknown	Unknown	Built as Utah & Western #3, to Utah & Nevada #3 in 1881. Became Oregon Short Line & Utah Northern #285 in 1889. Sold to Sumpter Valley #4 in 1892, renumbered 15 in 1906. Purchased from the SV.
6	Baldwin Locomotive Works	21848	0-4-4T	3/1903	1920	1938	Scrapped	Purchased from the United States Army at Fort Stevens Oregon.
7	Baldwin Locomotive Works	21991	0-4-4T	5/1903	1920	1927	Unknown	Purchased from the United States Army at Fort Stevens Oregon.
8	Baldwin Locomotive Works	22002	0-4-4T	10/1903	1920	1927	Burned in Engine House Fire	Purchased from the United States Army at Fort Stevens Oregon. Later Scrapped.
