= American Fork Railroad =

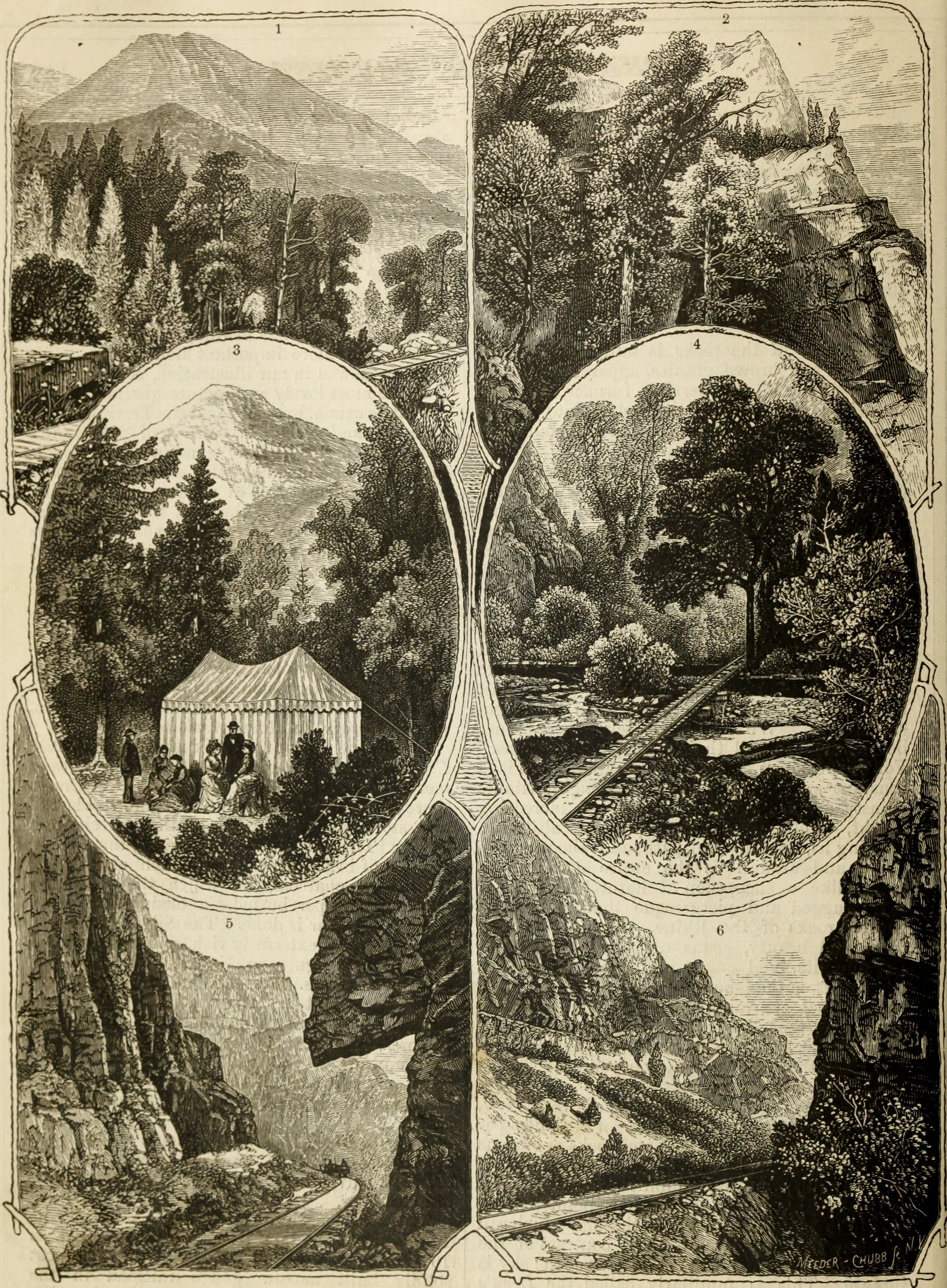
- Scenes in American Fork Canon, 1876: 1. Mt. Aspinwall or Lone Mountain. 2. Rock Summits. 3. Picnic Grove, Deer Creek. 4. A quiet Glen. 5. Hanging Rock. 6. Rock Narrows.

Technical
- Line length: 16 miles (30 km)
- Track gauge: 3 ft (914 mm)

The American Fork Railroad was a 16-mile (26 km) long 3 ft (914 mm) narrow gauge railway from American Fork to Forest City in Utah, which operated from 1872 to 1878.

== Foundation ==
The American Fork Railroad was founded by New York businessmen on April 3, 1872, as a subsidiary of the Miller Mining and Smelting Company. The founding documents were submitted on 16 April 1872 to the Auditor of Public Accounts. The company was managed by Major Edmund Wilkes of Salt Lake City, who also managed the mining company.

The measurement of the route was carried out from 30 April 1872, and the routing began on 3 June 1872. On 14 July 1872 enough rails for about 7 miles (11 km) of track and ten flat cars had arrived, but the track laying had already begun on 22 June 1872.

== Track Construction ==
Originally, it was planned that a 20-mile (32 km) long stretch from a station on the still-to-be-built Utah Southern, in or near American Fork City, should run to Sultana Smelter, above Fork Canyon. The route was laid from a transfer station at American Fork on the Utah Southern Railway, alongside the American Fork River in a northerly and then northeasterly direction through the American Fork Canyon. At the point where the canyon forks northeast and southeast, the railway followed the northeastern branch and should have run to the Sultana Smelter in Forest City (now named Dutchman Flat). The route gained 1,900 feet (580 m) in altitude and was in places unusually steep: on the steepest slopes it climbed as an adhesion railway with a grade of 5.6% – a difference in altitude of 296 feet per mile (56 m/km). The route had been graded all the way to the Sultana Smelter, but unfortunately the final four miles (6 1/2 km) were judged too steep for the trains to climb. Bullion was brought down from the smelter in wagons and loaded into the train cars at Deer Creek. To save on operating costs, the full cars were often allowed to coast down the steepest part of the track to the waiting locomotive.

By the end of September, 1872, the Utah Southern railway line had been completed to Lehi, Utah, about 5 miles (8 km) northwest of American Fork. The Utah Southern decided not to extend it for the time being. As a result, Utah Southern and the American Fork Railroad agreed that the American Fork Railroad could lay its narrow gauge track temporarily onto the Utah Southern right of way. This lasted until September 1873, but shortly thereafter, the track was regauged, when Utah Southern was extended its track further south to American Fork.

== Operation ==
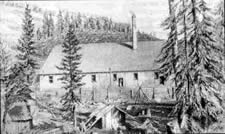
Sultana Smelter at the head of Mary Ellen Gulch in 1872

The narrow gauge train to be used on the American Fork Railroad arrived in Salt Lake City in July 1872, but the Utah Southern Railroad had made little progress past Sandy by then. The train was transported south to its new home by "leapfrogging": laying a section of temporary track, driving the train to the end, then pulling up the track and replacing it in front of the train. It arrived in American Fork and made its first test run on August 20, 1872. The railroad reached the end of its route on November 26, 1872, at Deer Creek, on the present site of Tibble Fork Reservoir.

The railway was not an economic success. Initially a Mason steam locomotive was used, which weighed only 14 or 15 tons. It proved to be unsuitable for the task. Therefore, horses and mules were used to haul the empty wagons up the mountain. Downhill they ran properly braked only by gravity.

== Decline ==
In late 1872, severe winter weather forced operations in American Fork Canyon to shut down for the season. In early 1873, railroad officials decided their small engine was too light for the steep railway, and mules took over pulling the train until a new larger engine arrived in the autumn. Canyon industries were not developing as rapidly as expected, and plans to extend the railroad to Forest City were abandoned for good. In the years 1874–1876 the American Fork Canyon mines began to peter out. The higher-grade ore bodies were being exhausted. Prospecting even further up the canyon led to the discovery of other good veins, but the country was rugged and development slow. The route was operated only on Mondays, Wednesdays and Fridays during the summer of 1875 and not at all in the winter.

As the transport volume of the mining companies was less than predicted, excursions for tourists were offered. In order to cover expenses the railroad began taking tourist groups up the canyon on sightseeing trips. The Miller Hill Mine stopped producing ore by 1874, started up again briefly the next year, then shut down permanently. The Sultana Smelter was dismantled in 1876, and Forest City was in serious decline. The canyon's other mines were not rich enough to keep the railroad profitable. The operation of the railroad uneconomical, so that the operation was discontinued. In June 1878 the American Fork Railroad became the first Utah railroad to go out of business, Its tracks were subsequently lifted. The rails and wagons were probably sold to Charles W. Scofield, the owner of the Bingham Canyon Railroad, the Camp Floyd Railroad and the Wasatch & Jordan Valley Railroad, who used them in August 1878 for the construction of the Utah & Pleasant Valley Railroad. The Deseret Evening News commented on the removal of the route by erroneously predicting on June 5, 1878, that the canyon "... is not likely to be visited in future, to any extent, by tourists." However, this prediction has not come true due to the increase in automobile tourism.

== Locomotives ==
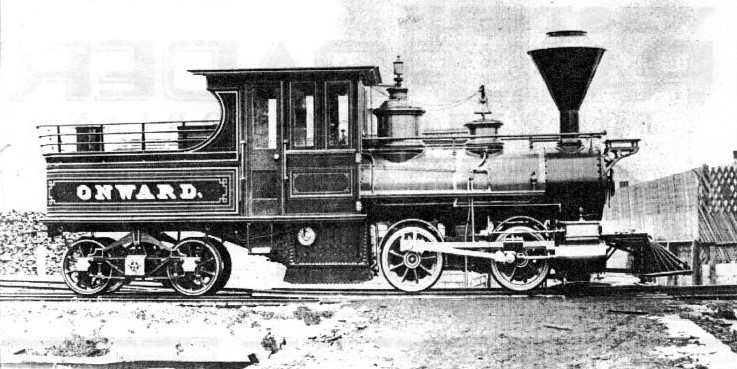
William Mason's Onward was renamed American Fork prior to delivery

No.	Manufacturer	Type	Works No.	Built	Cylinders	Driving wheels	Weight	Notes
1	Mason	0-4-4T	461	1 July 1872	10 × 15"	33"	13.5 t	Sold around Dec. 1873 to Eureka & Palisade Railroad. Sold in Oct. 1879 to Nevada Central Railroad. Sold in Dec 1882 to Utah and Northern Railway. Scrapped in 1886.
2	Porter	0-6-0	151	30 April 1874	12 × 16"	33"	20 t	Sold end of 1878 with wagons and rails to Utah & Pleasant Valley Railroad.

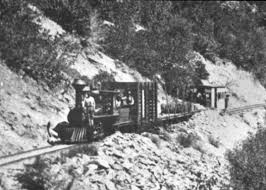
Mason Locomotive

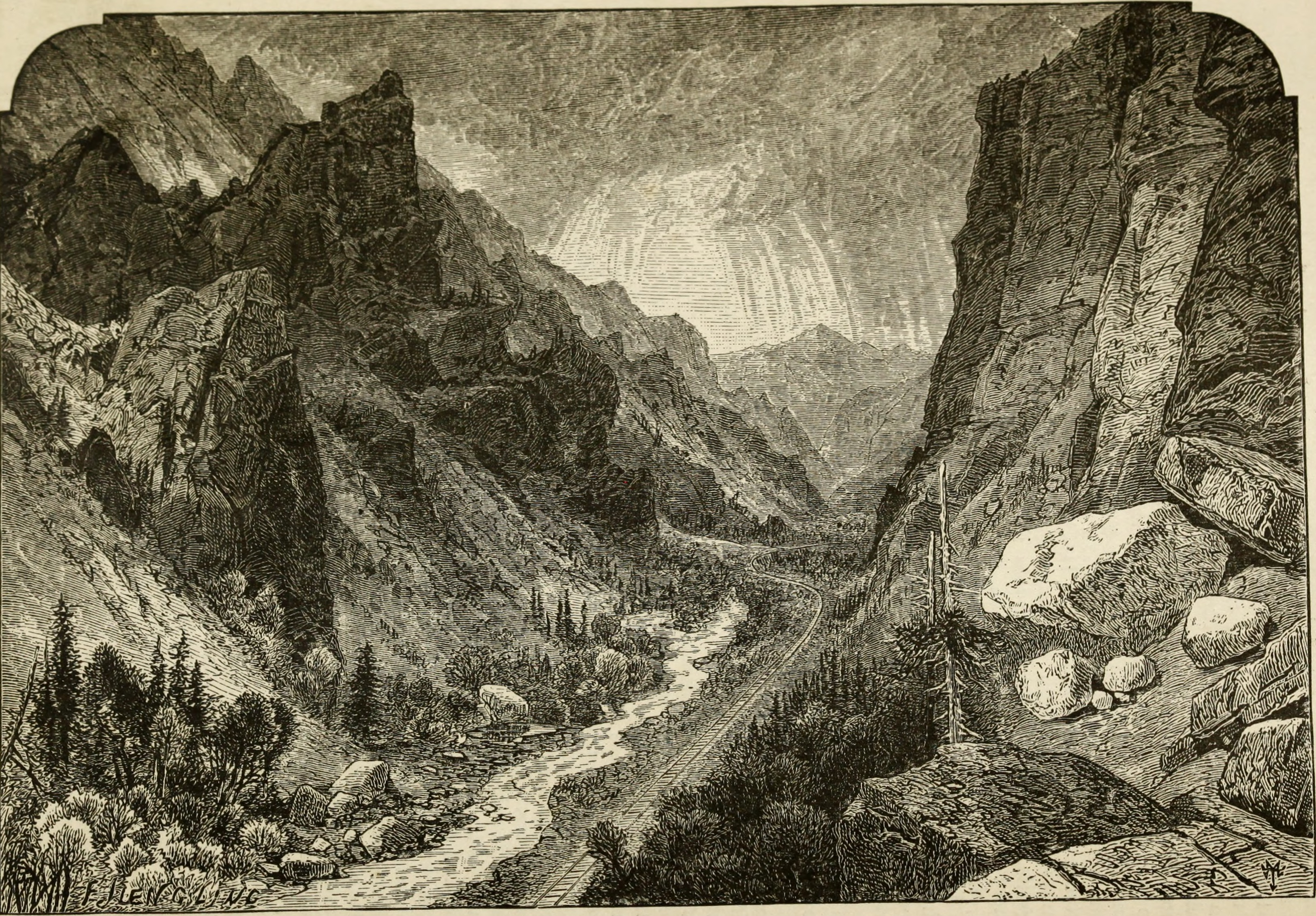
American Fork Canyon

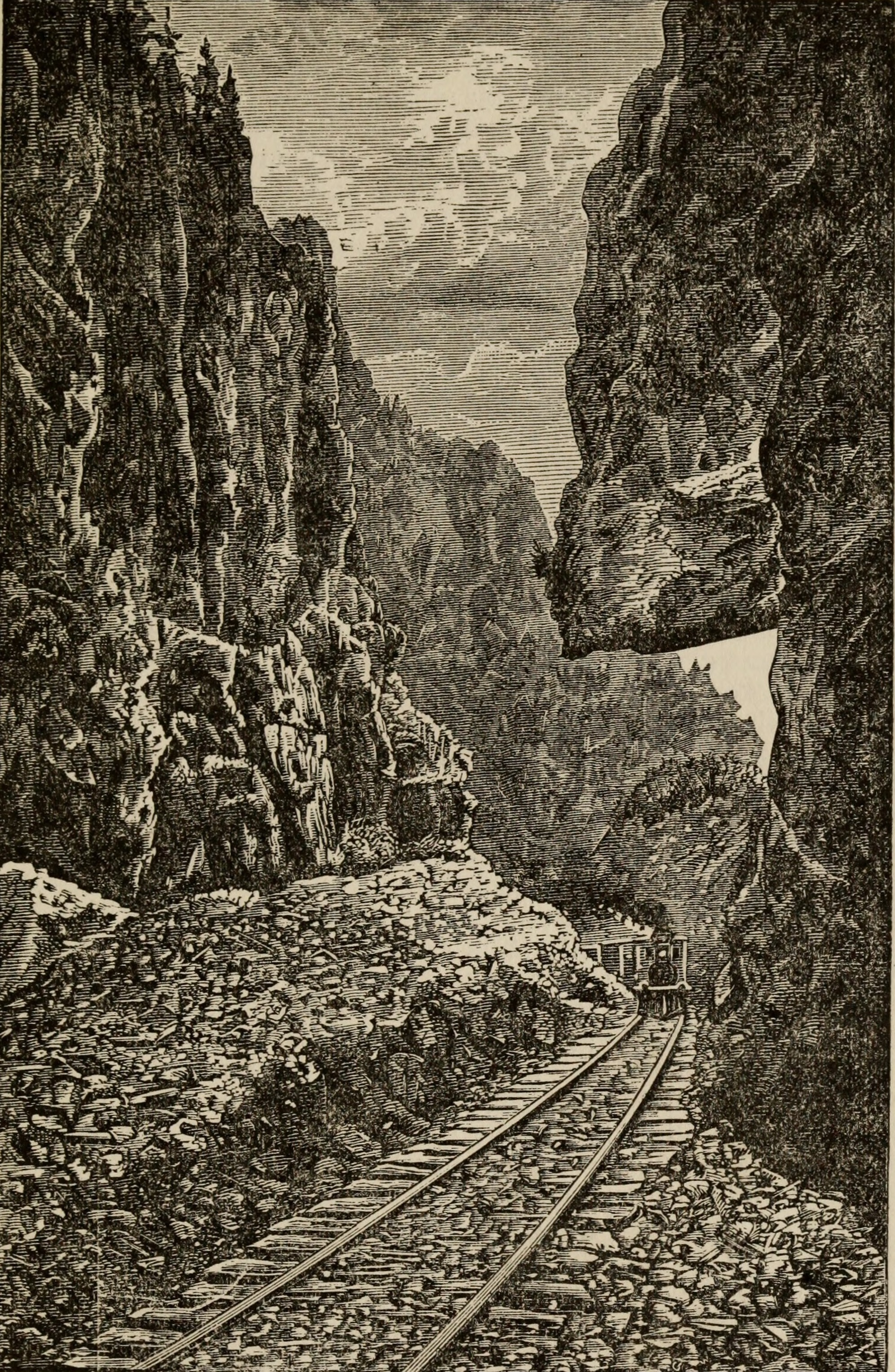
Hanging Rock

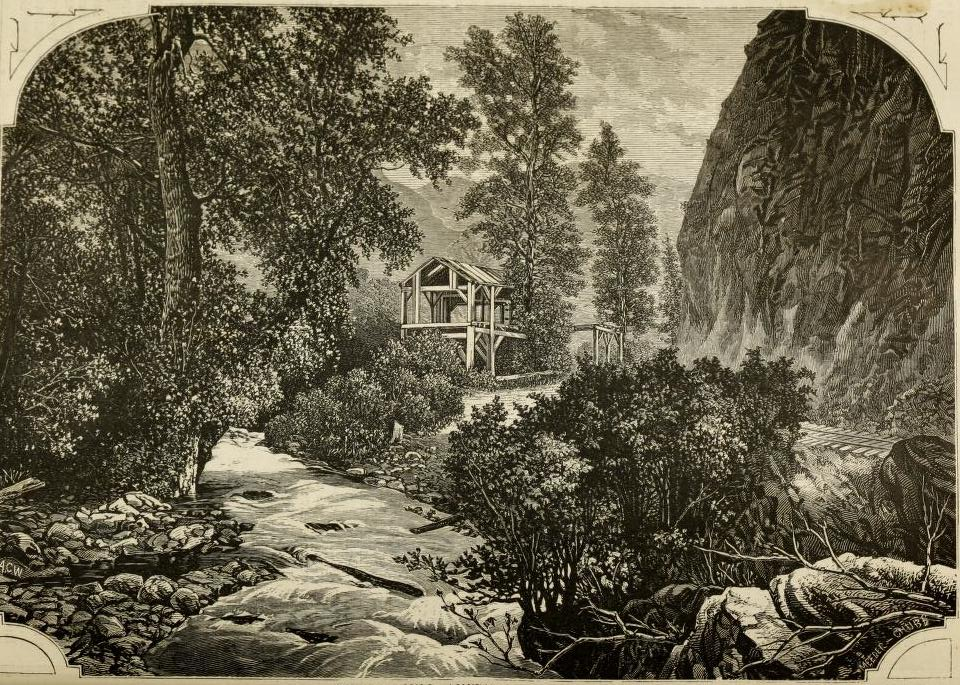
Old saw mill

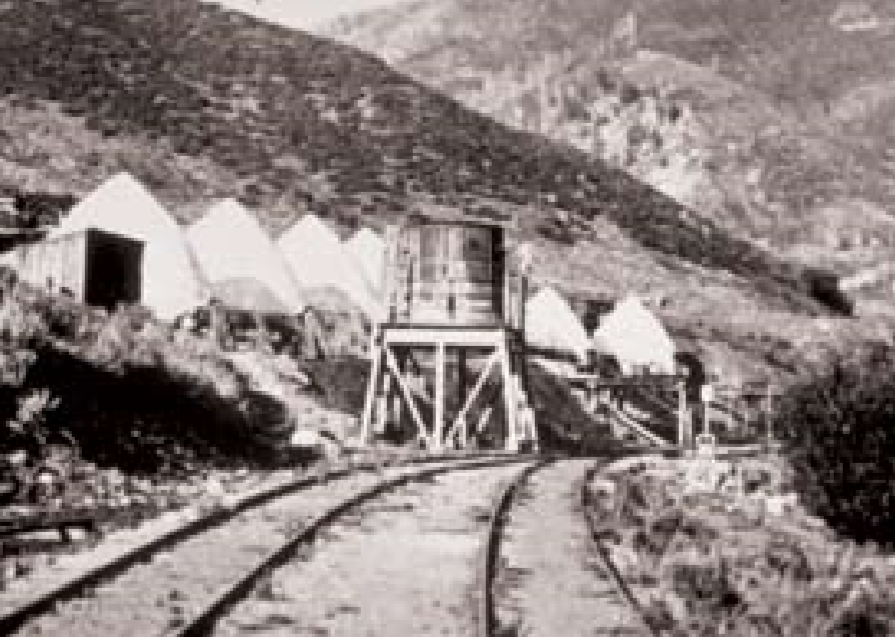
Smelter at Tibble Fork

== See also ==
- List of Utah railroads
