= Fallentimber, Pennsylvania =

Unincorporated community in Pennsylvania, US

- Unincorporated community
- Location within Pennsylvania
- Coordinates: 40°41′12″N 78°29′57″W
- Country: United States
- State: Pennsylvania
- County: Cambria
- Elevation: 1,437 ft (438 m)
- Time zone: UTC-5 (Eastern (EST))
  - Summer (DST): UTC-4 (EDT)
- ZIP code: 16639
- Area code: 814
- GNIS feature ID: 1174589

Fallentimber is an unincorporated community in Cambria County, Pennsylvania, United States. Its ZIP code is 16639.

== History ==
A post office called Fallentimber has been in operation since 1850. Fallentimber was named for the fact a storm flattened trees near the original town site.
