= Ramey, Pennsylvania =

Borough in Pennsylvania, US

- Borough
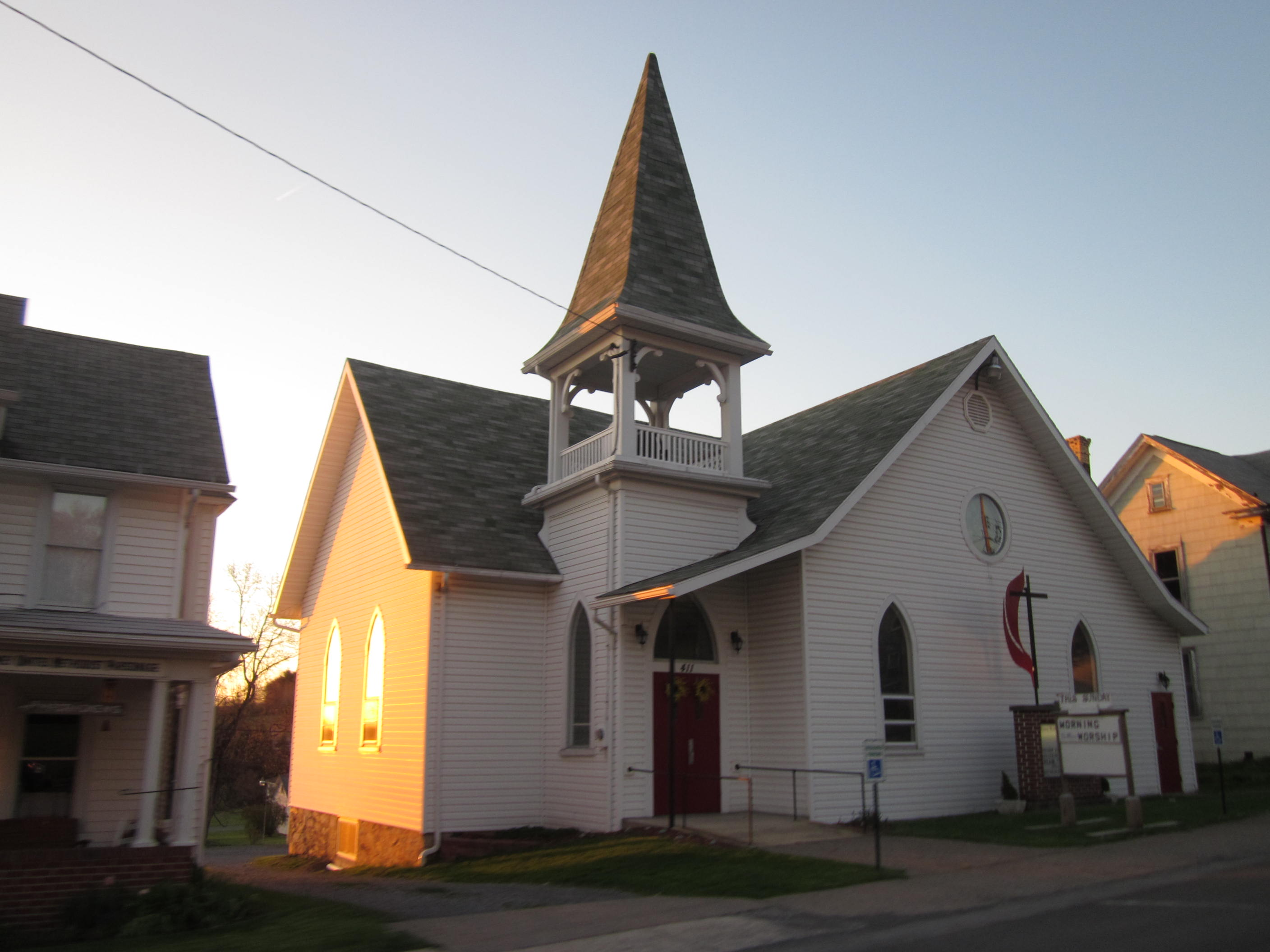
- Ramey, Pennsylvania

- Location of Ramey in Clearfield County, Pennsylvania.

- Location of Clearfield County in Pennsylvania

- Location in Pennsylvania
- Coordinates: 40°48′01″N 78°24′05″W
- Country: United States
- State: Pennsylvania
- County: Clearfield
- Incorporated: 1878

Government
  - Type: Borough Council

Area
  - Total: 0.93 sq mi (2.41 km^{2})
  - Land: 0.93 sq mi (2.40 km^{2})
  - Water: 0.0039 sq mi (0.01 km^{2})
- Elevation: 1,613 ft (492 m)

Population (2020)
  - Total: 436
  - Density: 470.0/sq mi (181.47/km^{2})
- Time zone: UTC-5 (Eastern (EST))
  - Summer (DST): UTC-4 (EDT)
- ZIP code: 16671
- Area code: 814
- FIPS code: 42-63360

Ramey is a borough in Clearfield County, Pennsylvania, United States. The population was 436 at the 2020 census.

== Geography ==
Ramey is located in southeastern Clearfield County at 40°48′1″N 78°24′5″W (40.800186, -78.401307), at the intersection of Pennsylvania Routes 253 and 453. PA 253 leads northeast 3.5 miles (5.6 km) to Houtzdale, and PA 453 leads northwest 4 miles (6 km) to Madera. The two highways together lead southwest 3 miles (5 km) to Janesville.

According to the United States Census Bureau, the borough of Ramey has a total area of 0.93 square miles (2.4 km^{2}), of which 0.004 square miles (0.01 km^{2}), or 0.41%, is water.

The Borough also has Code Enforcement Officer(s) which aim to help keep citizens in the borough to follow ordinance laws and to keep the borough clean and safe.

== Demographics ==
Historical population
Census	Pop.	Note	%±
1880	166		—
1900	806		—
1910	1,045		29.7%
1920	1,093		4.6%
1930	803		−26.5%
1940	753		−6.2%
1950	696		−7.6%
1960	558		−19.8%
1970	542		−2.9%
1980	568		4.8%
1990	536		−5.6%
2000	525		−2.1%
2010	451		−14.1%
2020	436		−3.3%
2021 (est.)	431	▼	−1.1%

As of the census of 2000, there were 525 people, 207 households, and 156 families residing in the borough. The population density was 584.8 inhabitants per square mile (225.8/km^{2}). There were 222 housing units at an average density of 247.3 per square mile (95.5/km^{2}). The racial makeup of the borough was 99.24% White, 0.38% Native American, and 0.38% from two or more races. Hispanic or Latino of any race were 0.95% of the population.

There were 207 households, out of which 32.9% had children under the age of 18 living with them, 59.9% were married couples living together, 11.1% had a female householder with no husband present, and 24.6% were non-families. 22.2% of all households were made up of individuals, and 14.5% had someone living alone who was 65 years of age or older. The average household size was 2.54 and the average family size was 2.95.

In the borough the population was spread out, with 24.6% under the age of 18, 7.8% from 18 to 24, 27.6% from 25 to 44, 20.6% from 45 to 64, and 19.4% who were 65 years of age or older. The median age was 38 years. For every 100 females there were 92.3 males. For every 100 females age 18 and over, there were 93.2 males.

The median income for a household in the borough was $29,167, and the median income for a family was $36,563. Males had a median income of $30,000 versus $20,000 for females. The per capita income for the borough was $14,101. About 7.5% of families and 10.1% of the population were below the poverty line, including 17.1% of those under age 18 and 3.3% of those age 65 or over.
