= Eureka and Palisade Railroad 4 Eureka =

Privately owned Baldwin Class 8/18 C 4-4-0 steam locomotive

Eureka
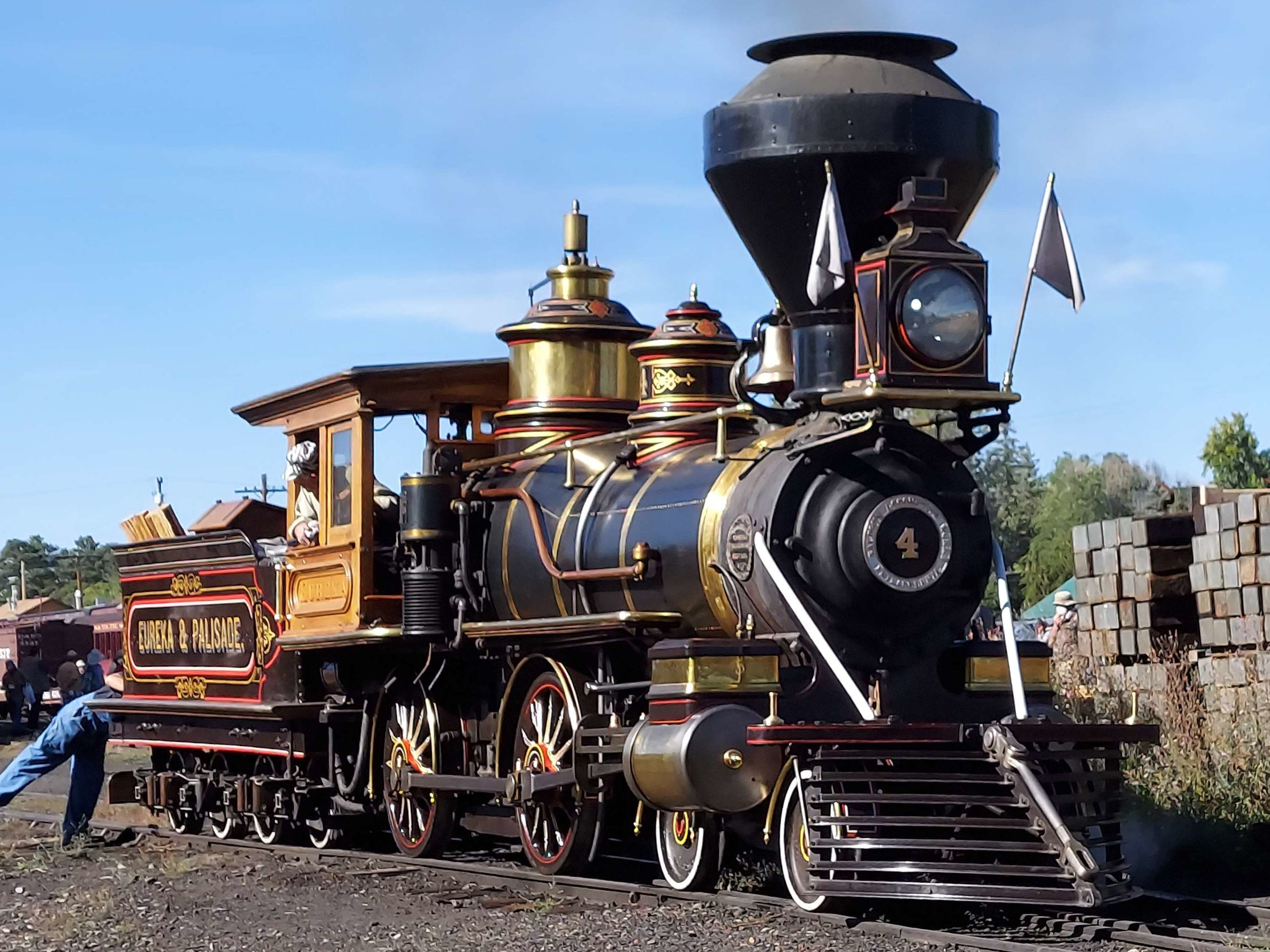
Type and origin
- Power type: Steam
- Builder: Baldwin Locomotive Works
- Serial number: 3763
- Model: 8-18 C
- Build date: July 1875
Specifications
- Configuration
  - Whyte: 4-4-0
  - UIC: 2′B n
- Gauge: 3 ft (914 mm)
- Driver dia.: 42 in (1,067 mm)
- Loco weight: 22 short tons (20.0 t)
- Fuel type: Wood
- Boiler pressure: 120 psi (0.83 MPa)
- Cylinders: Two, outside
- Cylinder size: 12 in × 16 in (300 mm × 410 mm)
- Valve gear: Stephenson
- Valve type: Side valve
- Loco brake: Air
- Train brakes: Air
- Couplers: Link-and-pin
Performance figures
- Tractive effort: 5,595 lbf (24.89 kN)
Career
- Operators: Eureka and Palisade Railroad; Sierra Nevada Wood and Lumber Company; Warner Brothers Entertainment; California State Railroad Museum
- Numbers: 4; SNW&L 5
- Retired: 1902 (E&P); 1938 (SNW&L); 1976 (WB)
- Restored: 1939 (WB); 1991 (Dan Markoff)
- Current owner: Daniel Markoff
- Disposition: Operational
- Eureka Locomotive
- U.S. National Register of Historic Places
- Location: Address Restricted
- Nearest city: Las Vegas, Nevada
- Coordinates: 36.227330°N 115.209348°W
- Built: 1875
- NRHP reference No.: 94001575
- Added to NRHP: January 12, 1995

The Eureka is a privately owned 3 ft (914 mm) gauge steam locomotive based in Las Vegas, Nevada. It is one of three preserved Baldwin class 8-18 C 4-4-0 locomotives in the United States, of which it is the only operable example. It is listed on the United States National Register of Historic Places.

== History ==
The locomotive was built by Baldwin Locomotive Works of Philadelphia, Pennsylvania in 1875 for the Eureka and Palisade Railroad of Nevada, which was built to transport passengers and goods from the mining town of Eureka to connect with the Central Pacific Railroad in Palisade. Eureka and its sister Palisade were reported as averaging 34.17 mph on the run from Palisade to Eureka upgrade with a single passenger coach by the Baldwin Locomotive Works catalog. Eureka served on this railroad until January 1902, when it was sold to the Sierra Nevada Wood and Lumber Company. It operated on the Sierra Nevada Wood and Lumber until 1938 when the company dissolved and the engine was sold to Hyman-Michaels and transported to their scrapyard in San Francisco.

Warner Bros. bought the engine in 1939, and it was featured in many films, such as Torrid Zone, Cheyenne Autumn, and The Great Train Robbery. The Eureka's last film appearance was in the 1976 film, The Shootist. In 1978, the California State Railroad Museum was in the process of restoring North Pacific Coast no. 12 Sonoma, another 8-18 C class 4-4-0 nearly identical to the Eureka. The museum had the latter stripped down to reveal its original paint scheme, and used it as a guide for restoring the former. The Eureka was sold in 1978 to Old Vegas, an amusement park in Henderson, Nevada, where it was placed on display in 1980. In 1985, a fire occurred at Old Vegas, with a burning building collapsing on the Eureka, badly damaging the engine.

A year later, the engine was discovered by Las Vegas attorney Dan Markoff, who purchased it and restored it to operating condition with the help of his father. The restored Eureka debuted at Railfair '91 at the California State Railroad Museum. It was then operated on U.S. Gypsum's private tracks in Plaster City, California, in 1993. The locomotive was listed as a structure on the National Register of Historic Places on January 12, 1995 and was the first transportation listing in Las Vegas.

In 1997, Eureka was transported to Chama, New Mexico, for a series of operational excursions over the Cumbres and Toltec Scenic Railroad in late June. The engine continues to make appearances at various narrow gauge tourist railroads during special events, such as the Cumbres and Toltec, Durango and Silverton Narrow Gauge Railroad, the Nevada State Railroad Museum in Carson City and Boulder City, among others. When the engine is not participating in such events, it is kept stored in Markoff's specially constructed shed, which is not open to the public. Dan Markoff is rather cautious as to how often the engine operates, and does not intend to have the engine operating regularly as the engine still retains its original boiler and several other components.
