= Ohio River and Western Railroad =

Ohio River & Western Railroad
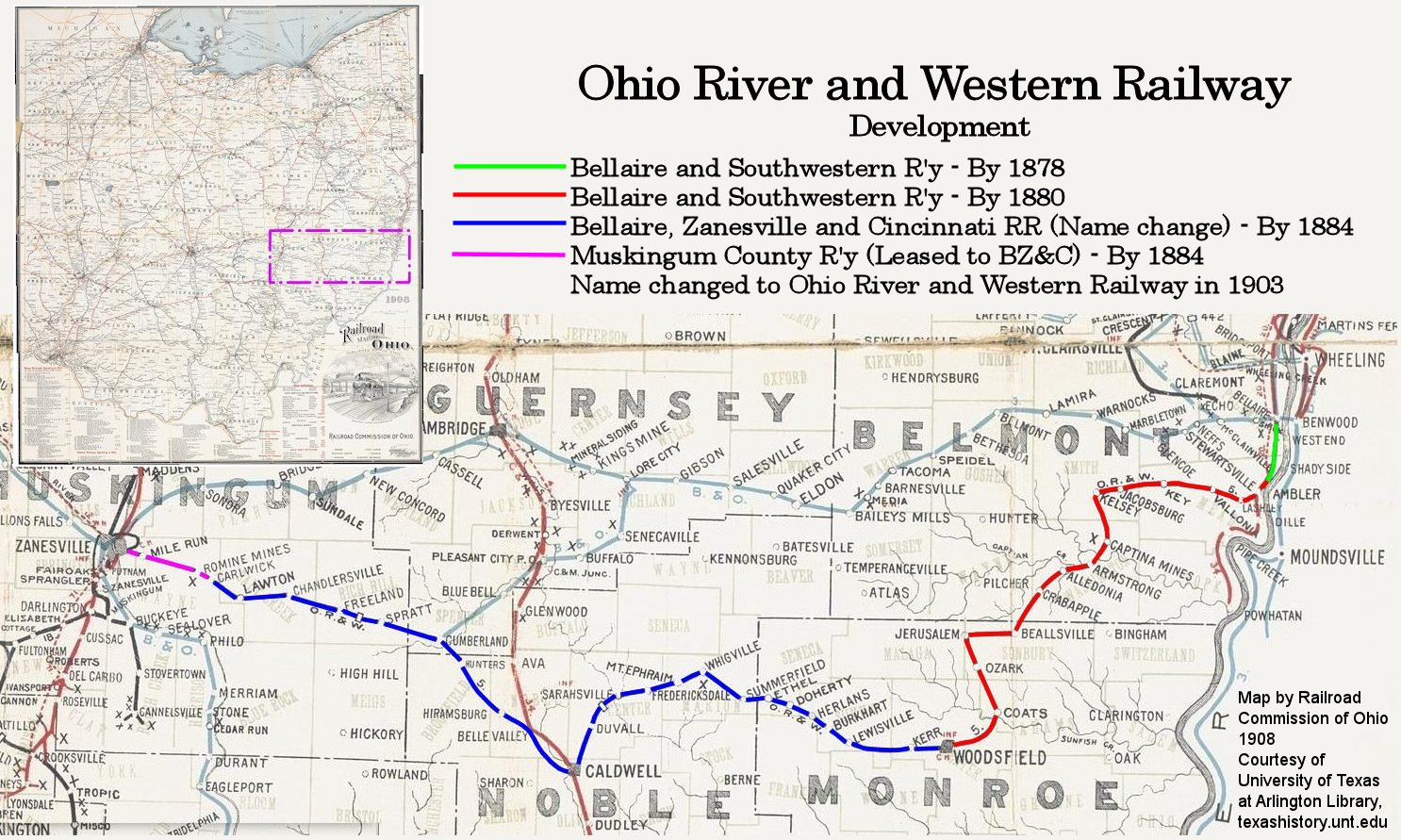
- Ohio River and Western Railroad ultimate development and construction phases.

Overview
- Locale: southeastern Ohio, United States
- Dates of operation: 1877–1931
- Predecessor: Bellaire and Southwestern Railway; Bellaire, Zanesville and Cincinnati Railroad

Technical
- Track gauge: 3 ft (914 mm)
- Length: 112 mi (180 km)

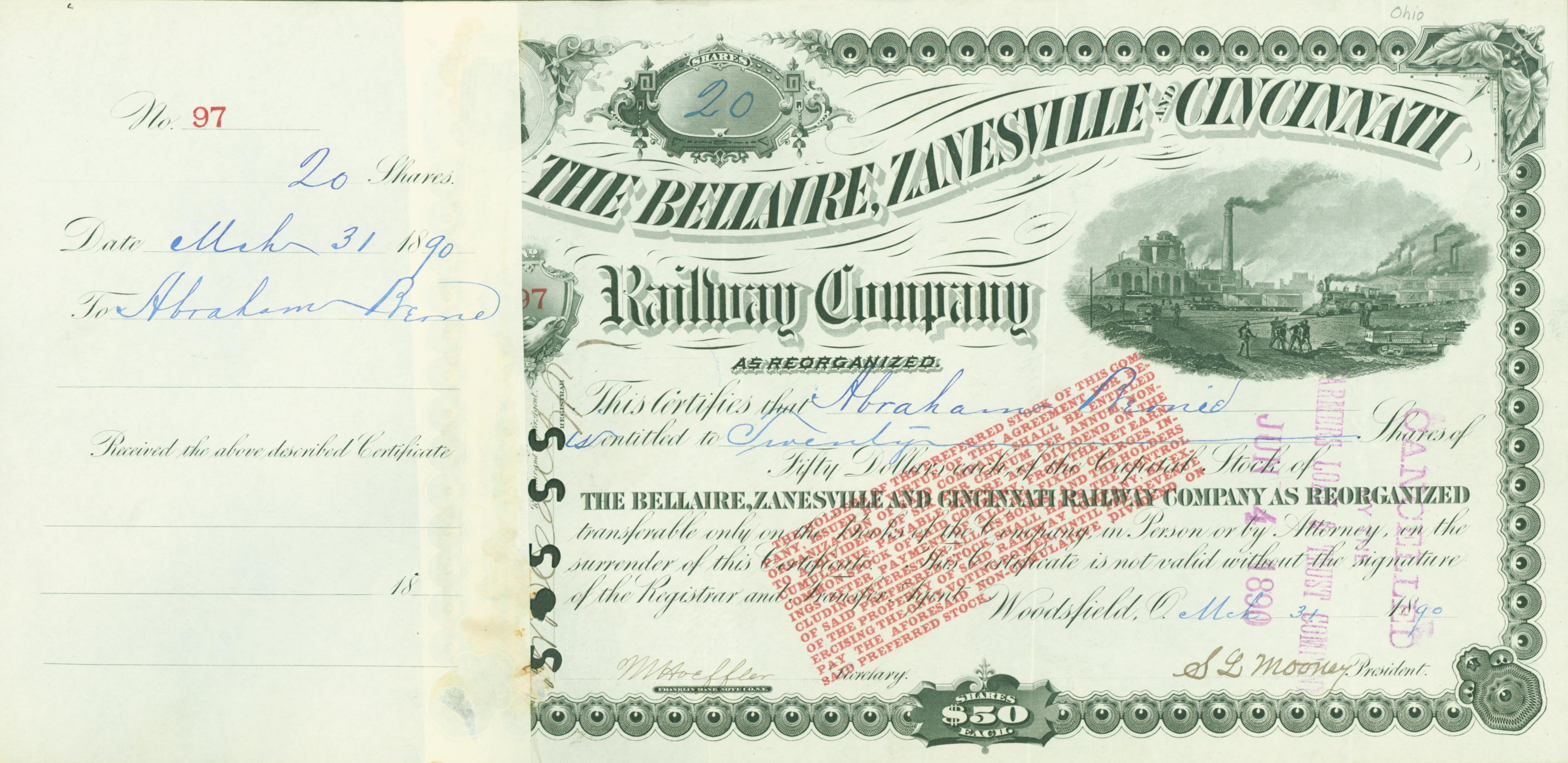
Share of the Bellaire, Zanesville and Cincinnati Railway Company, issued 31. March 1890

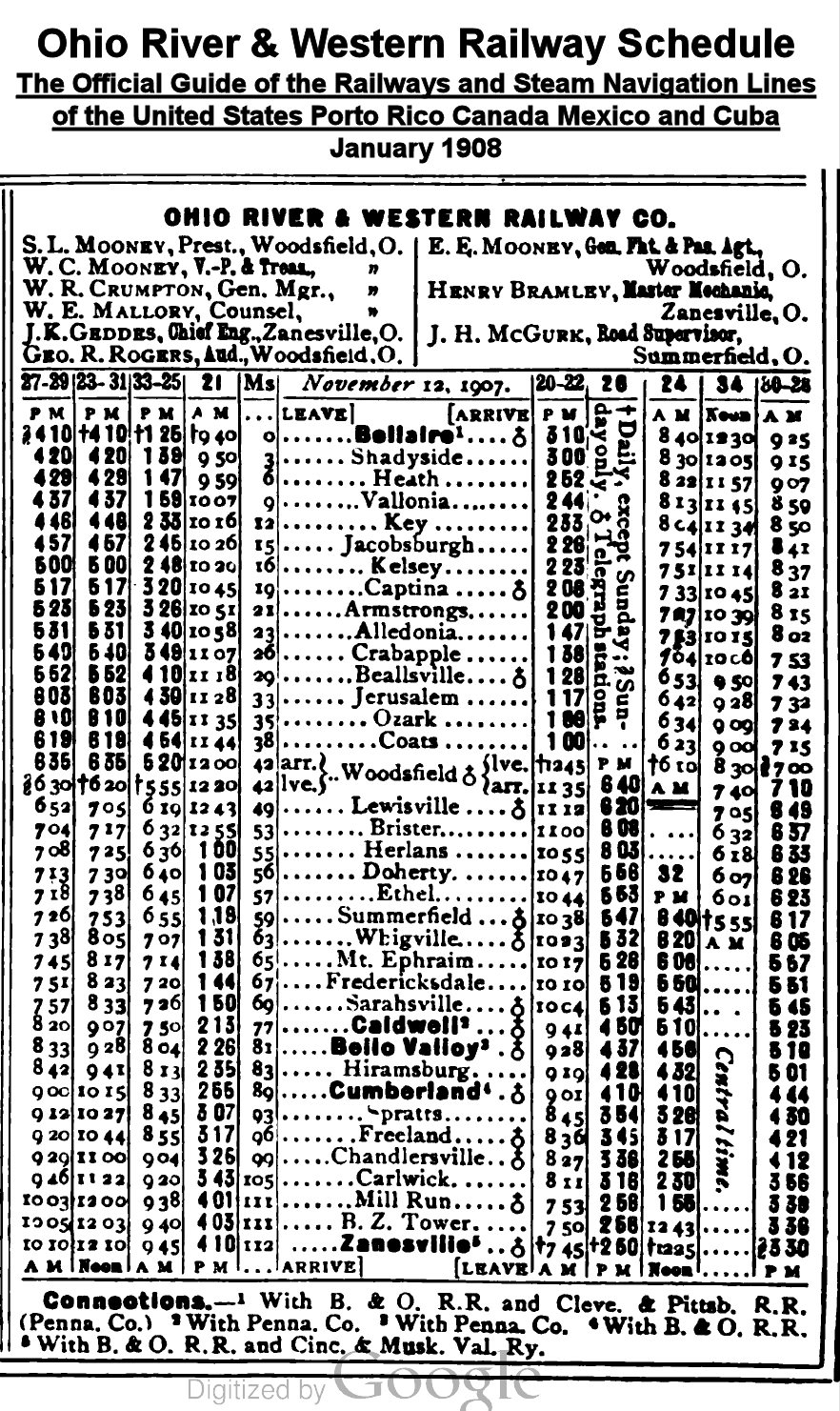
1908 Ohio River and Western Railway Passenger Schedule

The Ohio River & Western Railroad was a 112-mile-long (180 km) narrow gauge railway that was incorporated in 1875 and operated from 1877 or 1878 till 1931. The railroad was located in southeastern Ohio. The line ran from Bellaire (east point) to Zanesville (west end).

The Ohio River and Western Railroad began construction as the Bellaire and Southwestern Railway in 1876, starting at Bellaire, Ohio, on the Ohio River. It commenced operation in the late 1870s. It had reached Woodsfield by 1880. By 1884, it had reached Zanesville, Ohio, leasing the Muskingum County Railway from the county for the westernmost nine miles of track. At about the same time, the name became Bellaire, Zanesville and Cincinnati Railroad.

The final mile to the Zanesville depot was achieved through a trackage rights agreement with the Baltimore and Ohio Railroad.

The name Ohio River and Western Railway was adopted in 1903.

The company began to shorten its line in 1928, selling of the section west of Lawton to the PO&D; the section from there to Woodsfield was abandoned some time later. The remaining railroad ceased operations in 1931; the line from Key to Bellaire was sold to the Pittsburgh, Ohio Valley and Cincinnati Railroad in April 1931. The last train to run on the remaining railroad was on Memorial Day, May 30, 1931, and the line was abandoned the next day. The company was formally dissolved in 1935.
