= Rio Grande class K-37 =

Class of narrow gauge 2-8-2 locomotives

Denver & Rio Grande Western K-37
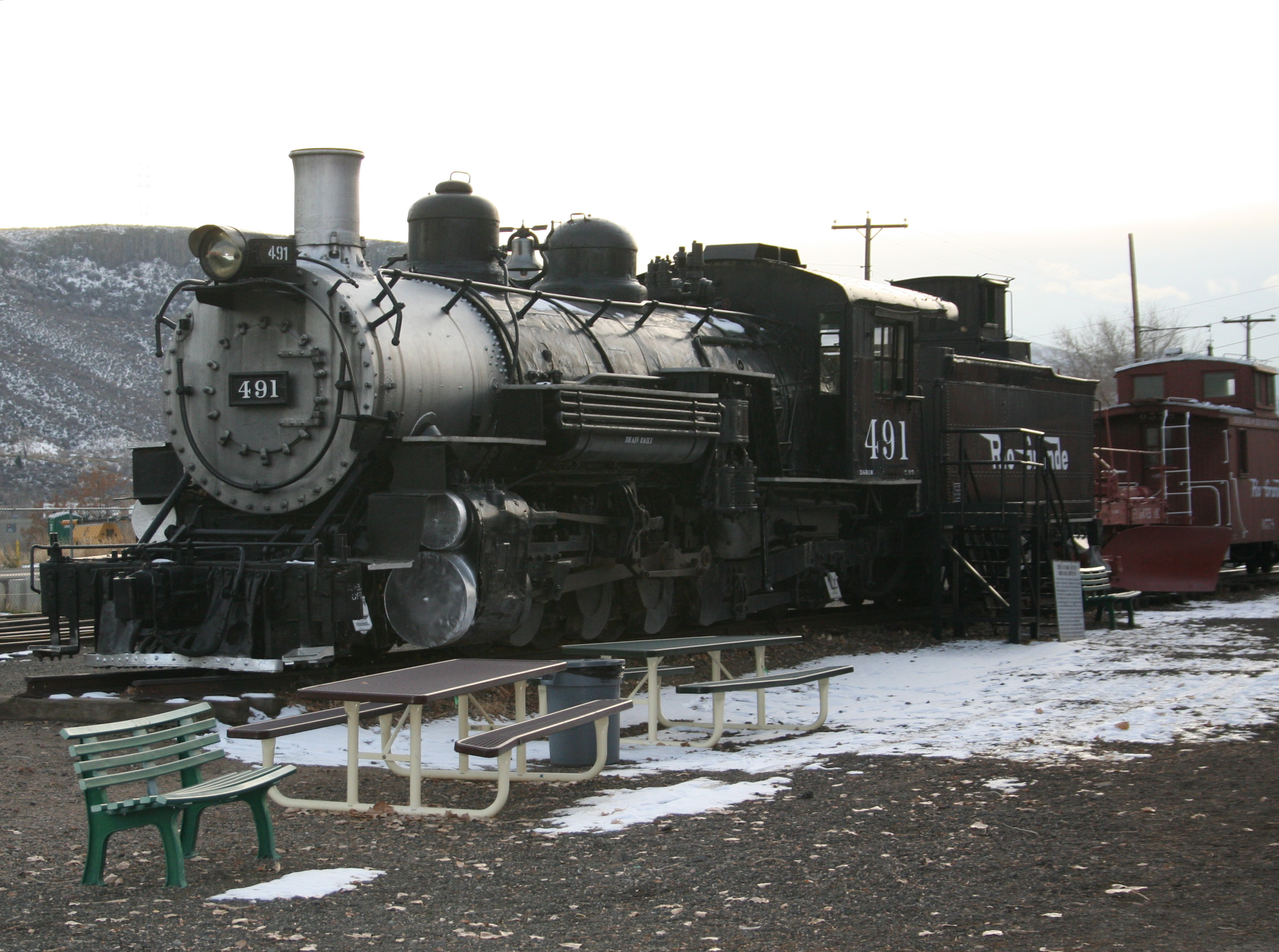
- D&RGW K-37 No. 491 on static display at the Colorado Railroad Museum
Type and origin
- Power type: Steam
- Builder: D&RGW Burnham Shops
- Build date: 1928, 1930
Specifications
- Configuration
  - Whyte: 2-8-2
  - UIC: 1′D1′ h2
- Gauge: 3 ft (914 mm)
- Leading dia.: 28 in (711 mm)
- Driver dia.: 44 in (1,118 mm)
- Trailing dia.: 28 in (711 mm)
- Wheelbase: 29 ft (8.8 m)
- Length: 41.1 ft (12.5 m)
- Width: 10.4 ft (3.2 m)
- Height: Engine: 13.3 ft (4.05 m); Tender: 13.5 ft (4.11 m)
- Loco weight: 187,250 pounds (84,940 kg)
- Fuel type: Coal (No. 493 converted to oil)
- Tender cap.: Water 6000 US gallons (22,712 litres) coal 9 tons(approx)
- Boiler pressure: 200 psi (1.38 MPa)
- Cylinders: Two, outside
- Cylinder size: 20 in × 24 in (508 mm × 610 mm)
- Valve gear: Walschaerts
- Valve type: Piston valves
- Loco brake: Air
- Train brakes: Air
- Couplers: Knuckle
Performance figures
- Tractive effort: 37,091 lbf (165 kN)
Career
- Operators: Denver & Rio Grande Western (D&RGW); Durango & Silverton (D&SNG); Cumbres & Toltec Scenic (C&TS); Colorado Railroad Museum (C.R.R.M.)
- Class: D&RGW: K-37
- Numbers: 490–499
- Locale: Colorado and New Mexico
- Retired: 1955 (No. 496), 1962–1968
- Preserved: Eight (Nos. 491, 492, 493, 494, 495, 497, 498 and 499) preserved, two (Nos. 490 and 496) scrapped
- Restored: No. 491; August 2014; No. 492; Ongoing; No. 493; January 24, 2020; No. 497; 1984
- Disposition: Nos. 491 and 493 operational, No. 497 awaiting overhaul, No. 492 undergoing restoration, No. 498 in storage, Nos. 494, 495 and 499 on display

The Denver and Rio Grande Western K-37 is a class of ten 2-8-2 "Mikado" type narrow-gauge steam locomotives built for the Denver and Rio Grande Western Railroad. They were rebuilt steam locomotives assembled in the D&RGW Burnham Shops as a near copy of the Rio Grande class K-36. In-house production was chosen to preemptively address material shortages and personnel issues (any possible labor unrest could be more easily controlled by the D&RGW). Burnham Shops was assisted in the construction of the class by the Stearn-Rogers Manufacturing Company. Despite popular opinion of most of the locomotive being converted from the standard gauge C-41's, only the tender was converted to narrow gauge. Only the original C-41 locomotives' boiler designs were reused in the K-37s, with the running gear and frame constructed new for the locomotive class.

The designation K-37 follows the D&RGW class-naming format of a letter, “K” for Mikado type, and a number “37” for its rated tractive effort of approximately 37,000 pounds.

== Design ==
The locomotives are of outside-frame design, with the driving wheels placed between the two chassis frames which support the boiler, but with the cylinders, driving rods, counterweights and valve gear on the outside. This general arrangement is shared with the earlier K-27, K-28 and K-36 Mikado type engines.

== History ==
The locos worked out of Salida, Colorado to Gunnison, Colorado and up the Crested Butte Branch as well as the Monarch Branch. The locos also worked out of Alamosa, Colorado to Antonito over Cumbres Pass to Chama and on to Durango and the Farmington branch. Like the K-36s the locos were not permitted west of Gunnison or on the Silverton branch. However, the Durango & Silverton has since been upgraded to handle K-36s and K-37s. Three of the K-37s, Nos. 491, 493 and 499, were equipped with steam heat and signal lines so they could haul passenger trains like the San Juan Express and Shavano.

Of the eight preserved K-37s, locomotive #497 has operated on both the Durango and Silverton Narrow Gauge Railroad (D&SNG) in Durango, Colorado from 1984 to 1991 and on the Cumbres and Toltec Scenic Railroad (C&TSRR) in Chama, New Mexico from 1992 to 2002. In late 2002, #497 was taken out of service, and as of 2021, it currently sits inside the Chama roundhouse awaiting a future overhaul.

The D&RGW operated #491 from 1928 to 1963, but in 1947 it added thermic siphons to improve efficiency by increasing heating surface area in the firebox. It was a test case applying these boiler improvements, which were common on standard-gauge locomotives, to a narrow-gauge locomotive. After sitting in a static display for decades, in August 2014, locomotive #491 was restored to operating condition at the Colorado Railroad Museum and operated for the first time in public on Saturday, September 13, 2014 at the annual Thomas the Tank Engine event. A ticketed "roll out" was hosted on August 29, 2014.

Although the K-37s are actually about 2% lighter than the K-36s, they were erroneously thought to be much harder on track. The Durango & Silverton originally owned four of the surviving K-37s, but they found that the #497 was too hard on their track and did not handle the Animas Canyon section of the route as well as they would have hoped. Consequently, they traded #497 to the Cumbres & Toltec for K-36 #482 and #499 to Royal Gorge Park in Canon City for #486. This has led to something of a stigma being attached to the locomotives among enthusiasts, believing that the issues suffered by #497 were the result of a fault in the locomotive's design, rather than an isolated issue. However, the problems experienced by the Durango & Silverton were due to mechanical complications with #497's trailing truck caused by a 1960 wreck, and not universal to all K-37s.

On February 16, 2022, the Cumbres & Toltec announced that #492 and #497 are both being evaluated to see which one was more fit for restoration to operating condition. After careful evaluation, the Cumbres & Toltec chose #492 for the restoration instead of #497. On August 9, 2023, #492 was moved off of its storage track and moved into the Chama roundhouse in preparation for the restoration. Currently, the Cumbres & Toltec is restoring 492 as a coal-burning locomotive and will also be temporarily using #497's tender behind #492.

=== Conversion to Oil ===
Steam locomotives are a popular and attractive element of heritage railroads like the D&SNG and the C&TSRR. Burning coal tends to produce cinders, which can be a primary source of ignition for wildfires. Converting an engine from coal to oil eliminates the source of cinders. This will allow the engines to run when drought conditions would warrant replacing a steam engine with a diesel locomotive to decrease the probability of ignition.

On May 4, 2016, the D&SNG, in cooperation with the Colorado Railroad Museum, transported locomotive #493 to Durango after resting in Silverton for almost 20 years with the plan of having the museum transport it to Golden, Colorado and have it restored as well. However, after plans with the museum fell through, the D&SNG decided to undertake the restoration of #493 themselves. In the restoration process of #493 however, the locomotive was converted to oil-burning, making it the very first former D&RGW 2-8-2 to be converted to oil-burning instead of coal-burning, the next one being K-28 class #473. On January 24, 2020, #493 moved under its own power for the first time in over 50 years, making it the first D&RGW K-37 class since #497 to run on the D&SNG. #493 then ran its first revenue run on the D&SNG on February 14, 2020.

== Roster ==
Locomotive details
Class K-37 Number	Image	Current Owner	Notes
490		n/a	Retired in 1962. Scrapped between 1963 and 1964.
491		Colorado Railroad Museum, Golden, CO	Retired in 1963. It was acquired by History Colorado in 1979. Then moved to the Colorado Railroad Museum in 1985; ownership of the engine was transferred to the museum in 2013. Restored to operating condition and made its first public run on August 30, 2014. Taken out of service in 2024 for its 15-year rebuild, returned to steam in late 2025 after gaining a new tender cistern.
492		C&TS	To C&TS in 1970. Stored in Chama, NM. Currently being restored to operating condition, as it was chosen instead of 497. Restoration work started on August 9, 2023.
493		D&SNG	Retired in 1968. Moved to D&SNG in March 1981. Restored to operating condition on January 24, 2020 and converted to an oil-burning engine. Operational.
494		C&TS	Retired in 1962. To C&TS in 1970. Currently on display in Antonito, CO.
495		C&TS	Retired in 1962. To C&TS in 1970. Currently on display in Antonito, CO.
496	–	n/a	Scrapped in 1955.
497		C&TS	To D&SNG in March 1981. Restored to operating condition in 1984. Traded to C&TS for K-36 No. 482 on October 9, 1991. Taken out of service in late 2002. Currently stored in Chama, NM inside the roundhouse. Awaiting a future overhaul. After careful evaluation of both 497 and 492, the latter was chosen for restoration.
498		D&SNG	To D&SNG in March 1981. Stored in Durango, CO.
499		Royal Gorge Park; Canon City	Retired in 1970. To D&SNG in March 1981. Traded to Royal Gorge Park for K-36 No. 486 in May 1999 for display.

== See also ==
- Rio Grande class C-19
- Rio Grande class K-27
- Rio Grande class K-28
- Rio Grande class K-36
