= Rio Grande class K-28 =

Class of steam locomotives

Denver & Rio Grande Western K-28 Class
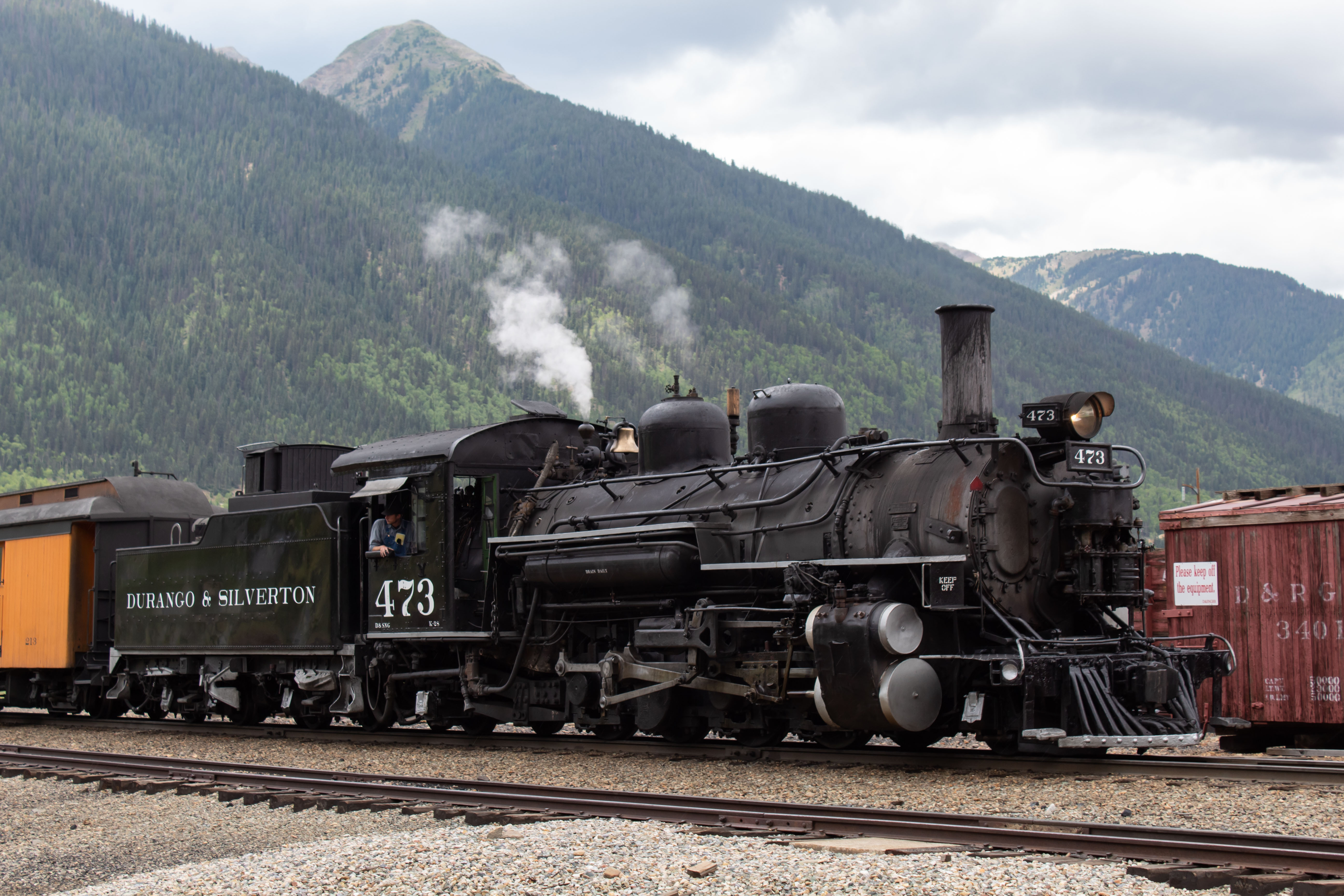
- D&RGW K-28 No. 473 at Silverton, Colorado
Type and origin
- Power type: Steam
- Builder: American Locomotive Company (ALCO)
- Build date: 1923
- Total produced: 10
Specifications
- Configuration
  - Whyte: 2-8-2
  - UIC: 1′D1′ h
- Gauge: 3 ft (914 mm)
- Driver dia.: 44 in (1,118 mm)
- Adhesive weight: 113,500 lb (51.5 t)
- Loco weight: As built: 140,000 lb (63.5 t); Later: 156,000 lb (70.8 t)
- Tender weight: 98,500 lb (44.7 t)
- Fuel type: Coal (Nos. 473 and 476 converted to oil)
- Fuel capacity: 16,000 lb (7.3 t)
- Water cap.: 5,000 US gal (19,000 L)
- Firebox
  - Grate area: 30.17 sq ft (2.8 m^{2})
- Boiler pressure: 200 lbf/in^{2} (1.38 MPa)
- Heating surface
  - Firebox: 102 sq ft (9.5 m^{2})
- Superheater: Type A
- Cylinders: Two, outside
- Cylinder size: 18 in × 22 in (457 mm × 559 mm)
- Valve gear: Walschaerts
- Valve type: 11-inch (279 mm) piston valves
- Loco brake: Straight air
- Train brakes: No. 6 E-T
Performance figures
- Tractive effort: 27,540 lbf (123 kN)
- Factor of adh.: 4.12
Career
- Operators: Denver and Rio Grande (D&RG); Denver and Rio Grande Western (D&RGW); White Pass and Yukon (WP&Y); Durango and Silverton (D&SNG)
- Class: D&RG: 140; D&RGW: K-28
- Numbers: 470–479
- Nicknames: Sports Model
- Locale: Colorado, New Mexico & Alaska
- Preserved: Three (Nos. 473, 476 and 478) preserved on D&SNG, seven scrapped after WW2
- Restored: No. 473; 1981; No. 476; 1981 (1st restoration), February 2018 (2nd restoration); No. 478; 1981
- Disposition: Nos. 473 and 476 operational and No. 478 awaiting overhaul

The Denver and Rio Grande Western K-28 is a class of ten 3 ft (914 mm) gauge narrow gauge 2-8-2 "Mikado" type steam locomotives built in 1923 by the Schenectady Locomotive Works of the American Locomotive Company (ALCO) for the Denver & Rio Grande Railroad. They were the first new narrow gauge locomotives ordered by the railroad since 1903. They initially comprised class E-4-148-S, but were reclassified K-28 in 1924 when the railroad reorganized into the Denver & Rio Grande Western Railroad. The designation K-28 follows the D&RGW class-naming format of a letter, “K” for Mikado type, and a number “28” for its rated tractive effort of approximately 28,000 pounds.

== Design ==
The chassis is of outside-frame design with the drive wheels placed between the two main frames and the steam cylinders and running gear (cranks, counterweights, rods and valve gear) to the outside. This general arrangement was also used on the earlier class K-27 and later class K-36 and K-37 engines.

== Operations ==
Among other duties, they were tasked with hauling the express passenger trains over the D&RGW's narrow gauge lines, such as the San Juan from Alamosa to Durango, the Shavano from Salida to Gunnison and The Silverton from Durango to Silverton. The K-28s also operated on the Chili Line from Antonito to Santa Fe until that route was closed in 1941.

=== White Pass & Yukon ===
During World War II, seven members of the class were purchased by the US Army for use on the White Pass and Yukon Route in Alaska and the Yukon where they were renumbered USA 250 to USA 256. But they did not fare well in the bitter Yukon winters: In particular, the extended counterweights on the driving wheel axles made them liable to ride up on trackside ice, and as a result, lifting the engine off the rails. All seven were withdrawn from service in 1944 (coinciding with the winding-down of military operations, and the return of WP&Y to civilian control) and were barged to Seattle in 1946 for scrapping.

=== The K-28s today ===
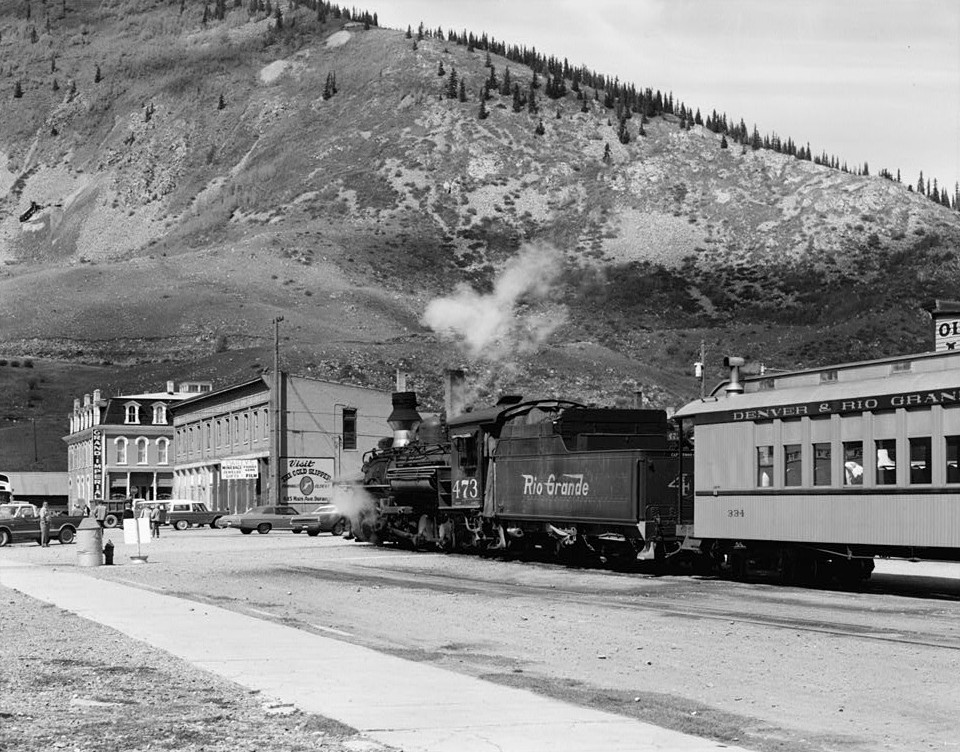
#473 in Silverton in 1971

The three locos which remained with the D&RGW, numbers 473, 476 and 478, were assigned to the Durango – Silverton tourist trains from the 1950s onwards. The Durango & Silverton inherited these when it took over the Silverton Branch in 1981.

Due to their smaller size, these engines are often used by the Durango & Silverton for shorter trains, usually the first or last on the schedule, and also for helper service or sectioned trains. Despite being slightly smaller, older and less powerful than the K-36s, the engine crews tend to favor a trip on these engines because the design ALCO used was superior in balance and servicing. Firing can be tricky when the engine is working hard, as the clamshell-style firedoors tend to pull into the backhead of the boiler due to the draft, and if any flues in the boiler are leaking the loss of draft on the fire is much harder to work around than on the K-36 locomotives.

Firing while the engine is working hard is done with a large "heel" pattern, generally with as little coal on the flue sheet as possible, and gradually sloping the fire bed towards the door sheet to the height or higher than the firedoors. This results in the draft being forced through the fire bed in the thinner areas towards the flue sheet, which usually is hindered by the lack of draft between the grates and the arch brick. New firemen sometimes have difficulty learning this because there are fewer training hours available on the K-28 locomotives compared to the railroad's more-used K-36's which have a larger firebox and have more leeway of poor technique.

These locomotives are popular subjects for model railroaders and high-quality scale models in HOn3 and On3 scales have been produced by several manufacturers since the 1950s.

=== Conversion to oil ===
As of June 2022, locomotives 473 and 476 are in active service and have both been converted from coal-burning to oil-burning. Locomotive 478 is on temporary display in the D&SNG roundhouse museum where locomotive 476 was previously placed in, but will eventually undergo a complete overhaul.

== Variants ==
The Oahu Railway and Land Company in Hawaii was impressed with the K-28 and ordered four locomotives of the same design which were delivered in 1925 and 1926. These were identical in specification but oil-fired and with minor differences in fittings (slightly shorter tender with an oil tank in place of the coal bunker, smokebox front, air compressor location, headlamp, etc.).

== Roster ==
D&RGW Number	WP&Y Number	Builder's Number	Disposition
470	250	64981	Entered service at White Pass and Yukon Route on December 8, 1942. Scrapped.
471	251	64982	Entered service at White Pass and Yukon Route on November 28, 1942. Scrapped.
472	252	64983	Entered service at White Pass and Yukon Route on January 14, 1943. Scrapped.
473	N/A	64984	To D&SNG in March 1981. Restored to operating condition in 1981. Operational. Converted from coal-burning to oil-burning and returned to service in May 2021.
474	253	64985	Entered service at White Pass and Yukon Route on February 28, 1943. Fell off barge into bay at Haines, Alaska, hence delay of service. Was the only K-28 to not be fitted with steam heat and signal lines for passenger service. Scrapped.
475	254	64986	Entered service at White Pass and Yukon Route on December 15, 1942. Scrapped.
476	N/A	64987	To D&SNG in March 1981. Restored to operating condition in 1981. Taken out of service in September 1999. Placed on display at the D&SNG Museum from 1999-2016. Rebuilt between 2016-2018. Operational. Converted from coal-burning to oil-burning and returned to service on May 25, 2022.
477	255	64988	Entered service at White Pass and Yukon Route on December 19, 1942. Scrapped.
478	N/A	64989	To D&SNG in March 1981. Restored to operating condition in 1981. Almost swapped with C&TSRR K-36 No. 483 in 2015. Taken out of service in early 2016. Currently on display in the D&SNG Museum. Awaiting a future overhaul.
479	256	64990	Entered service at White Pass and Yukon Route on January 10, 1943. Scrapped.

== See also ==
- Rio Grande class C-19
- Rio Grande class K-27
- Rio Grande class K-36
- Rio Grande class K-37
