= Rio Grande class K-36 =

Class of American narrow gauge 2-8-2 locomotives

Denver & Rio Grande Western K-36 class
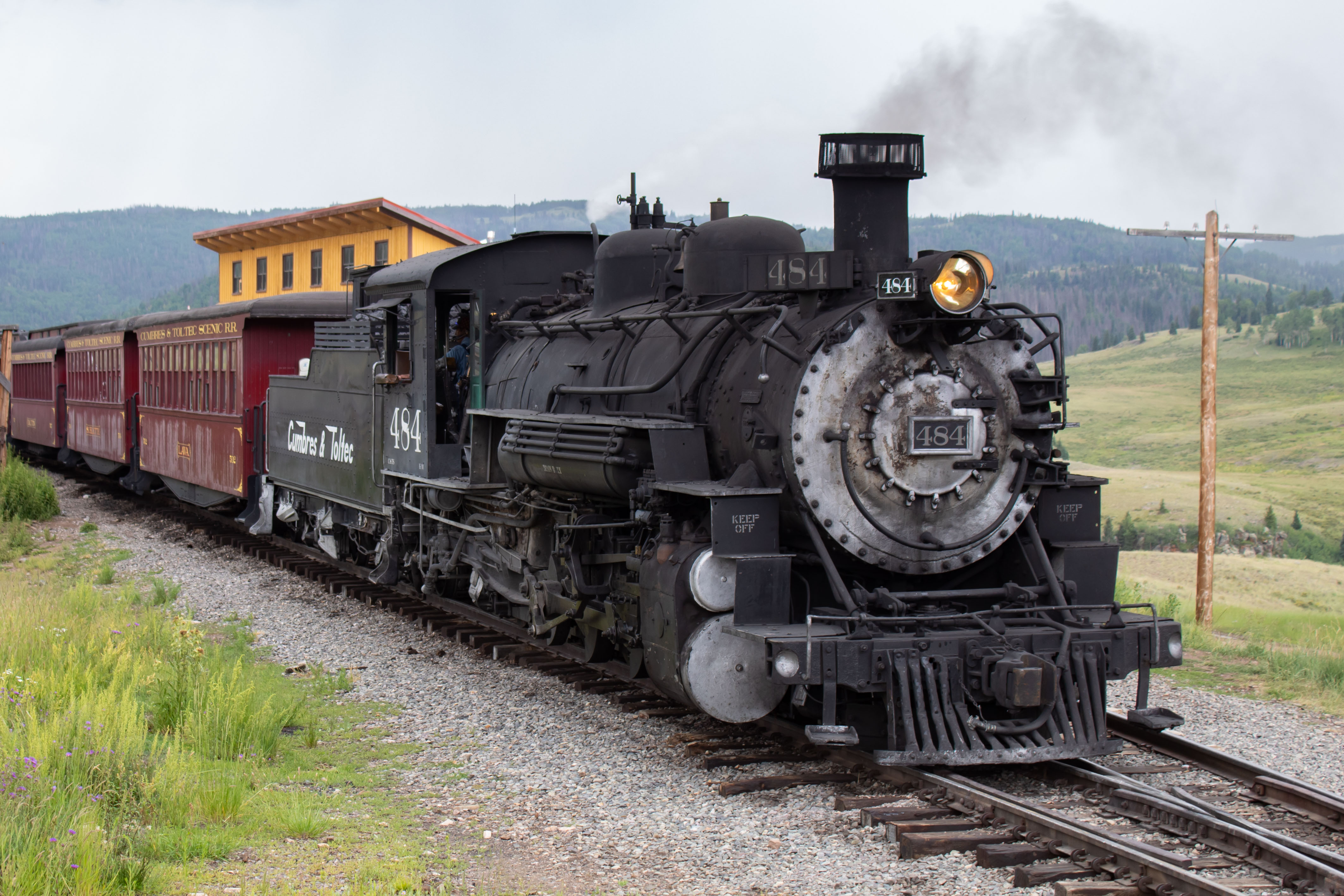
- D&RGW K-36 No. 484 at the Cumbres and Toltec Scenic Railroad
Type and origin
- Power type: Steam
- Builder: Baldwin Locomotive Works
- Model: 12-34 1/4 E 68-77
- Build date: 1925
- Total produced: 10
Specifications
- Configuration
  - Whyte: 2-8-2
  - UIC: 1′D1′ h2
- Gauge: 3 ft (914 mm)
- Driver dia.: 44 in (1,118 mm)
- Loco weight: 187,100 lb (84.9 t)
- Fuel type: Coal (Nos. 480, 481, 482, 486, 487 and 489 converted to oil)
- Boiler pressure: 195 lbf/in^{2} (1.34 MPa)
- Cylinders: Two, outside
- Cylinder size: 20 in × 24 in (508 mm × 610 mm)
- Valve gear: Walschaerts
- Valve type: Piston valves
- Loco brake: S-6 (part of 6-ET schedule equipment)
- Train brakes: 6-ET automatic air brakes on all. 480, 481, 482 and 486 also have straight air equipment. All delivered with G-6 equipment new.
- Couplers: Knuckle
Performance figures
- Tractive effort: 36,200 lbf (161.03 kN)
Career
- Operators: Denver & Rio Grande Western Railroad (D&RGW); Durango & Silverton (D&SNG); Cumbres & Toltec Scenic (C&TS)
- Numbers: 480–489
- Locale: Colorado and New Mexico
- Retired: 1955 (No. 485), 1962–1968
- Preserved: Four (Nos. 480, 481, 482 and 486) preserved on the D&SNG, five (Nos. 483, 484, 487, 488 and 489) preserved on the C&TS
- Disposition: All but one preserved

The Denver and Rio Grande Western K-36 is a class of ten 3 ft (914 mm) narrow gauge 2-8-2 "Mikado" type steam locomotives built for the Denver and Rio Grande Western Railroad (D&RGW) by Baldwin Locomotive Works. They were shipped to the Rio Grande in 1925 and were first used along the Monarch Branch and Marshall Pass, but were later sent to the Third Division out of Alamosa. Of the original ten, four are owned by the Durango and Silverton Narrow Gauge Railroad (D&SNG) and five by the Cumbres and Toltec Scenic Railroad (C&TSRR). Number 485 fell into the turntable pit at Salida and was scrapped in Pueblo in 1955, with many parts being saved. No. 483, while no longer operable, remains on display at the Cumbres & Toltec Scenic Railroad. Nos. 480, 481, 482, & 486 could be seen riding around at the Durango & Silverton Narrow Gauge Railroad, & nos. 484, 487, 488, & 489 could be seen at the Cumbres & Toltec Scenic Railroad.

The locomotives are of outside-frame design, with the driving wheels placed between the two chassis frames which support the boiler, but with the cylinders, driving rods, counterweights and valve gear on the outside. This general arrangement is shared with the earlier K-27, K-28 and later K-37 Mikado engines.

== Designation ==
The locomotives' designation of K-36 comes from two different sources. The K in the designation comes from the locomotives' wheel arrangement (Mikado), and the 36 stands for 36,200 pounds of tractive effort.

== In Service ==
The K-36s were used primarily as freight locomotives out of Alamosa to Durango and to Farmington, New Mexico, as well as out of Salida to Gunnison (over Marshall Pass) until 1955 and to Monarch on the Monarch Branch until 1956. They were built with special valves to allow brake control between locomotives while double-heading and were commonly found between Alamosa, Colorado, and Chama, New Mexico. They were heavily used during the pipe boom in Farmington and hauled long freight trains between Alamosa and Farmington.

In 1937, three K-36s, Nos. 482, 483 and 489, were equipped with steam heat and signal lines to haul passenger trains like the Shavano and the San Juan Express. Eventually, in 1945, Nos. 484, 485 and 488 were also equipped, too.

As of 2023, eight of these locomotives still operate regularly. Nos. 483, 484, 487, 488 and 489 are owned by the Cumbres and Toltec Scenic Railroad (C&TSRR) and Nos. 480, 481, 482 and 486 are owned by the Durango and Silverton Narrow Gauge Railroad (D&SNG). However, No. 483 is stored out of service at Chama undergoing a full cosmetic restoration by the Friends of the C&TSRR as of 2023.

These locomotives are popular subjects for model railroaders and high-quality models in HOn3 and On3 scales have been produced by several manufacturers, as well as several hand-built live steam larger scale models. A notable example is a 1/3 scale, ridable miniature railway model of number 489, in use on the 10 1/4 inches (260 mm) gauge Audley End Railway in Essex, England.

=== Conversion to oil-burning ===
After the 416 Fire in southwestern Colorado, which federal officials alleged was started by airborne embers from a coal-burning Durango & Silverton locomotive, the D&S undertook a comprehensive rebuild of its locomotive fleet, eventually converting all of their steam locomotives to burn oil rather than coal. Oil firing produces no airborne embers, and therefore has a much lower risk of starting wildfires. The process began with K-37 No. 493 in 2018, with the K-36 fleet being rebuilt a few years later.

No. 480 re-entered service on the D&S after conversion in June 2021, with sister 482 joining it on December 16, 2021. In August 2022, No. 486's tender was rebuilt with an oil bunker for temporary use behind No. 480, for use while 486 itself was being converted. No. 481 remained the last coal burner on roster until March 23, 2024, when it pulled the final regularly scheduled coal-fired excursion on the D&S, and returned to service as an oil burner on May 22, 2026. While there were originally plans to retain at least one locomotive as a coal burner on the D&S, chief mechanical officer Randy Babcock was quoted as saying that it "doesn't make business sense" to keep a locomotive on roster that can only be used for a quarter of the operating season.

On the Cumbres & Toltec, in late 2019 No. 489 temporarily went out of service for a new smokebox installation during its Federal Railroad Administration (FRA) mandated 1,472-day boiler inspection. On December 15, 2020, the railway announced that in addition to the boiler inspection and overhaul, the engine would also be converted from burning coal to oil, returning to service in June 2021 as the first converted locomotive on the railway. On August 3, 2022, the C&T announced that parts had been ordered for a second K-36, No. 487, to be converted to oil over the winter of 2022 to 2023, eventually returning to service in 2024.

In 2020, C&T interim CEO Eric Mason said the decision to convert No. 489 was based on changing environmental conditions just like on the D&S, with conversion to oil-firing allowing the railway to continue operating with steam power in worsening summer heat. The other two K-36s on the C&T, Nos. 484 and 488, are planned to be retained as coal burners to respect "the importance of our historical DNA" and to "[preserve] the most authentic steam railroading experience available anywhere, now, and for future generations," as quoted by Mason.

== Roster ==
Number	Photo	Builder's Number	Current Owner	Notes
480		58558	D&SNG	Retired in 1970. Went to D&SNG in March 1981. Restored to operating condition in July 1985. Operational. Converted from coal-burning to oil-burning and returned to service in June 2021.
481		58559	D&SNG	Went to D&SNG in March 1981 and was the first K-36 run to Silverton. Operational. It was the last operational coal-burning locomotive left on the D&SNG's active roster until March 2024. Converted to oil-burning and returned to service on May 22, 2026.
482		58541	D&SNG	Retired in 1962. Went to C&TS in 1970. Traded to D&SNG October 9, 1991 in exchange for K-37 class No. 497. Restored to operating condition on May 2, 1992. Operational. Converted from coal-burning to oil-burning and returned to service on December 16, 2021.
483		58584	C&TS	Retired in 1968. Went to C&TS in 1970. Retired from service on the C&TS in 1977. Almost swapped out with K-28 class No. 478 in 2015 from the D&SNG. Stored in Chama, NM. Undergoing a cosmetic restoration as of 2016. 483 also hauled the last steam powered scheduled passenger train on the Denver and Rio Grande Western Railroad on May 29, 1965. It was a fan trip from Alamosa to Durango, Colorado.
484		58585	C&TS	Went to C&TS in 1970. Restored to operating condition in 1971. Operational.
485		58586	N/A	Fell into the Salida turntable pit on December 7, 1953. Due to severe damage, No. 485 could not be repaired and was scrapped on January 24, 1955. Many parts were salvaged and used on other locomotives.
486		58587	D&SNG	Retired in 1962. Went to Royal Gorge Park for display in December 1967. Traded to D&SNG in May 1999 in exchange for K-37 class No. 499. Restored to operating condition in August 2000. Taken out of service in late 2019. Currently on display in the D&SNG Museum. Awaiting a future overhaul and conversion from coal-burning to oil-burning as of 2023. Tender converted to oil-burning setup in August 2022.
487		58588	C&TS	Went to C&TS in 1970. Restored to operating condition in 1973. Taken out of service in October 2021. Converted from coal- to oil-burning in 2024.
488		58589	C&TS	Went to C&TS in 1970. Restored to operating condition in 1979. Operational.
489		58590	C&TS	Retired in 1962. Went to C&TS in 1970. Restored to operating condition in 1981. Operational. Converted from coal-burning to oil-burning and returned to service in June 2021.

== See also ==
- Rio Grande class C-19
- Rio Grande class K-27
- Rio Grande class K-28
- Rio Grande class K-37
