= Denver and Rio Grande (film) =

1952 film

- VHS cover
- Directed by: Byron Haskin
- Written by: Frank Gruber
- Produced by: Nat Holt; Harry Templeton
- Starring: Edmond O'Brien; Sterling Hayden; Kasey Rogers
- Cinematography: Ray Rennahan
- Edited by: Stanley E. Johnson
- Music by: Paul Sawtell
- Distributed by: Paramount Pictures
- Release date: May 16, 1952 (New York)
- Running time: 89 minutes
- Country: United States
- Language: English
- Box office: $1.18 million (U.S. rentals)

Denver and Rio Grande is a 1952 American Technicolor Western film directed by Byron Haskin and starring Edmond O'Brien, Sterling Hayden, Dean Jagger, Kasey Rogers (billed as Laura Elliot) and Lyle Bettger.

== Plot ==
In the late 1870s, chief engineer Gil Harkness and construction foreman Jim Vesser are surveying a new route for the Denver and Rio Grande Railroad (D&RG) through the Royal Gorge in Colorado. Vesser learns that a crew from the competing Cañon City & San Juan Railroad (CC&SJ) is also in the gorge and confronts former friend Bob Nelson and his unscrupulous boss McCabe, who shoots Nelson in the back during a fight. McCabe and his crony Johnny Buff blame Vesser, who thinks that he accidentally shot Nelson while stunned from a blow. Linda Prescott, the secretary of D&RG president William J. Palmer, believes Vesser to be a cowardly killer. An injunction stops work by the D&RG in the gorge. Linda, who is actually Nelson's sister and is spying for McCabe, angrily accuses him of acting above the law.

Vesser persuades Harkness to defy the injunction. When he enters the camp saloon to bring the men back to work, one of McCabe's agitators sparks a brawl over his lack of pay. Palmer obtains payroll money in Denver, but the train returning him to the construction camp is robbed by three men, who shoot Palmer's accountant. Vesser returns to the saloon, sees two men gambling with a lot of cash when everyone else is broke and accuses them of robbing the payroll. They try to flee toward the CC&SJ camp and a gunfight ensues. Vesser kills one and wounds the other, who Palmer identifies as one of the robbers but says that the unknown third robber is the man who murdered his accountant. Vesser confronts Linda, revealing that he saw her riding in the direction of McCabe's camp, but she dismisses his insinuations.

The injunction is lifted, but Palmer announces that he must travel to Denver to prevent the company from receivership and takeover by the CC&SJ. Linda reveals his plans to McCabe, who assembles his drunken thugs to prevent Palmer from reaching Denver by stealing a D&RG train and seizing all its stations to block the tracks. A D&RG telegrapher warns Palmer, who rallies his men to fight McCabe's. Vesser, Palmer and the D&RG men barrel through the blockade. Vesser and Harkness uncouple the engine from the rest of their train and allow it to crash into the stolen train to stop it from killing all of the others. Linda has doubts about McCabe after the violence and admits everything, but Palmer releases her.

Vesser barricades the gorge to keep McCabe in his camp while Palmer continues on to Denver via another branch. Linda returns to the camp and recognizes Buff as the killer of the accountant, and he confesses just as McCabe enters. They argue and Buff exposes McCabe as Nelson's killer. McCabe places dynamite on a train car that will be sent hurtling into Vesser's barricade. Dodging bullets from McCabe and Buff, Linda runs to the barricade to warn Vesser and the others, who scatter in time to avoid the blast. McCabe is shot in the back by Buff and killed in the explosion. Vesser forgives Linda and looks forward to building the railroad.

== Cast ==
- Edmond O'Brien as Jim Vesser
- Sterling Hayden as McCabe
- Dean Jagger as General William J. Palmer
- Kasey Rogers as Linda Nelson/Linda Prescott (as Laura Elliot)
- Lyle Bettger as Johnny Buff
- J. Carrol Naish as Gil Harkness
- Zasu Pitts as Jane Dwyer
- Tom Powers as Sloan
- Robert Barrat as Charlie Haskins
- Paul Fix as Engineer Moynihan
- Don Haggerty as Bob Nelson
- James Burke as Sheriff Ed Johnson

== Production ==
The film is a dramatization of the construction of the Denver and Rio Grande Western railroad, which was chartered in 1870. The film was shot in the summer of 1951 on location using actual D&RG track (now part of the Durango and Silverton Narrow Gauge Railroad) near Durango, Colorado.

The film's plot is a fictional account based on two factual right-of-way struggles in 1878-1879 between the D&RG and the Atchison, Topeka and Santa Fe Railway. One fight occurred across the Raton Pass from Trinidad, Colorado to Raton, New Mexico, where an armed confrontation actually took place, and the other, known as the Royal Gorge War, involved a route between Cañon City and Leadville, Colorado."

Denver and Rio Grande features a spectacular head-on collision filmed on July 17, 1951 between two Denver and Rio Grande Western locomotives, C-18 #319 and C-19 #345 (painted as the #268), that were slated for retirement.

== Reception ==
In a contemporary review for The New York Times, critic Howard Thompson called the film "no better or worse than expected" and wrote: "Mr. Holt has, in fact, gone to a great deal of trouble to duplicate the railroad construction camps of the Eighteen Seventies. But, again, in using a highly graphic frame as a playground for some familiar foolishness, Mr. Holt has deliberately compromised. 'The Denver and Rio Grande' isn't much of a motion picture, but it assuredly adds up to a picture in motion."

== Home media ==
The film was originally released on VHS format on November 11, 1998. DVD and Blu-ray issues were released on May 29, 2012.
