= San Juan Express =

Former American train line

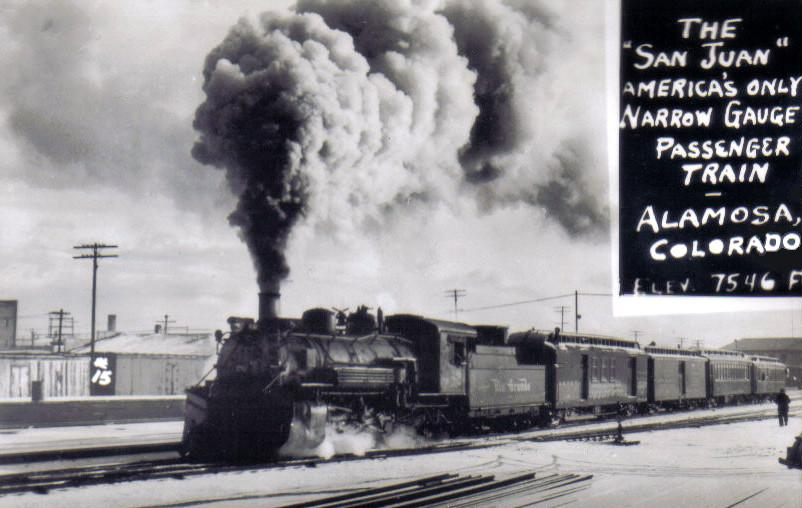
- The San Juan Express at Alamosa, Colorado

Overview
- Service type: Inter-city rail
- Status: Discontinued
- Locale: Western United States
- First service: February 11, 1937
- Last service: January 31, 1951
- Former operator: Denver and Rio Grande Western Railroad

Route
- Termini: Durango, Colorado; Alamosa, Colorado
- Train number: 115/116

The San Juan Express (also known as simply the San Juan) was a narrow gauge train that ran on the 3 feet (0.91 m) Denver and Rio Grande Western Railroad (D&RGW) route from Durango, Colorado via Chama, New Mexico; Cumbres Pass; and Antonito, Colorado to Alamosa, Colorado. The train ran from February 11, 1937 until January 31, 1951 as train numbers 115 and 116, though towards the end of the passenger service it took on the number 215 and 216.

The railroad line was closed by the D&RGW in 1968 and much of the narrow gauge trackage has since been abandoned. A surviving portion of the narrow gauge track in the route is the 64 miles (103 km) long Cumbres & Toltec Scenic Railroad between Antonito and Chama which calls its westbound train the Colorado Limited and its eastbound train the New Mexico Express. The line from Antonito to Alamosa is now standard gauge only and belongs to the Colorado Pacific Rio Grande Railroad. Normally, from Alamosa to Chama, a K-36 (or K-37) class locomotive, either 482, 483, 484, 485, 488, or 489 would haul the 4 to 5 car consist. At Chama, the K-36 and their crew would be swapped out with a K-28 and their crews would take over from Chama, to Durango. On the return journey it would be the other way around. However, there is photographic evidence of a K-36 locomotive hauling the train the entire length.

Normally, the train would be four cars long, which consisted of a railway post office (or RPO) car, a baggage bar, a passenger car, and a parlor car. However, there is photographic evidence of the train having as many as 8 cars.

== Frequently used engines ==
One of the most frequently used locomotives on this route was and still is the steam wheel arrangement K-36 2-8-2 "Mikado" type. Other locomotives used on this route included the K-27, the K-28, and the K-37 classes, along with the C-18 on occasion. One K-27 and one K-37 are used on the Cumbres and Toltec, with C-18 Rio Grande 315 periodically visiting both the Durango and Silverton and the Cumbres and Toltec railroads.

== Sections used today ==
The Cumbres and Toltec Scenic Railroad uses the portion from Antonito to Chama. The portion from Durango to Silverton (not part of the San Juan Express) is run by the Durango and Silverton Narrow Gauge Railroad. The line from Antonito to Alamosa is now standard gauge only and belongs to the Colorado Pacific Rio Grande Railroad.

== See also ==
- San Juan Extension
- Sublette Station
- Union Depot (Pueblo, Colorado)
- List of Denver and Rio Grande Western Railroad lines
