= Monarch Branch =

Railroad branch line

Overview
- Status: Defunct
- Owner: Denver and Rio Grande Western Railroad
- Locale: Colorado, United States
- Termini: Poncha Junction (until 1956) Salida (1956 - 1982); Monarch
- Connecting lines: UP Tennessee Pass line
- Former connections: D&RGW Marshall Pass line

Service
- Type: Mine railway

History
- Opened: 1883
- Closed: 1982

Technical
- Line length: 15 mi (24 km)
- Track gauge: 4 ft 8 1/2 in (1,435 mm)
- Old gauge: 3 ft 0 in (914 mm)
- Highest elevation: 10,090 ft (3,080 m)
- Maximum incline: 4.5%

The Monarch Branch was a branch line of the Denver & Rio Grande Western built in the 1880s to serve the Colorado Fuel & Iron limestone quarry at Monarch, Colorado. Originally part of the D&RGW's 3 ft 0 in (914 mm) narrow-gauge system, the 15 mile line connected with the rest of the narrow-gauge network at Poncha Junction, on the Marshall Pass line. The upper part of the Branch was on a 4.5% grade and included both an "S" curve and a double switchback to reach an elevation of over 10,000 ft (3,000 m). The line was converted to standard-gauge in 1956 after the narrow-gauge mainline from Salida to Gunnison was closed in the early 1950s. From that time forward, the line operated as a standard-gauge branch of the D&RGW until the early 1980s when Colorado Fuel & Iron closed its blast furnaces at Pueblo, Colorado. Operations on the Monarch Branch subsequently ceased and the rails were pulled up a short time later.

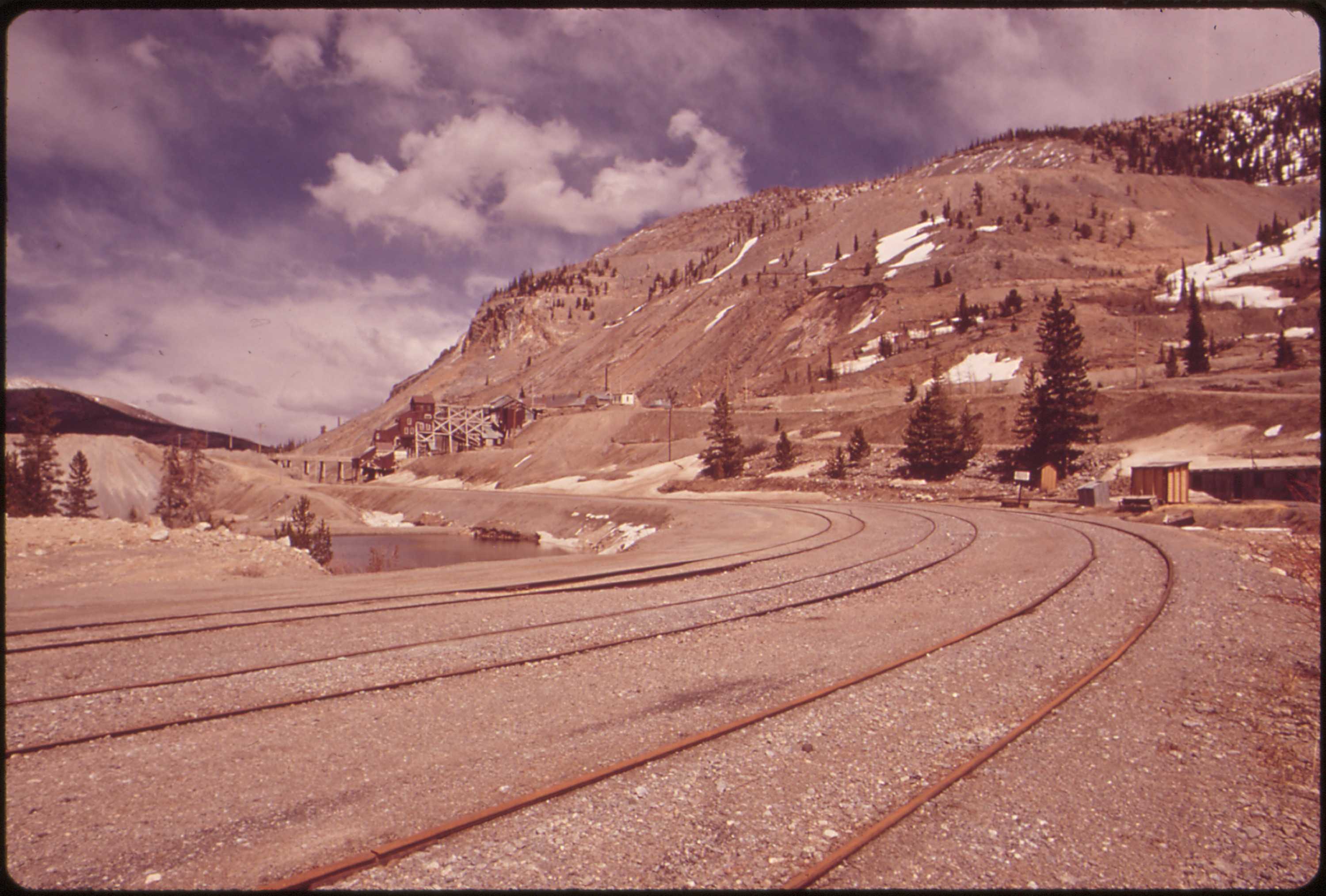
C&FI Feldspar Mine at Monarch Pass

== Operations ==
During the later narrow-gauge era, the line was worked with the D&RGW's fleet of K-36 and K-37 2-8-2 steam locomotives. Depending on the direction, trains would run either double headed or with a banker on the steep gradients. Once the switchbacks had been reached, each train was broken up and run in sections. Loaded trains then traveled to the D&RGW's yards at Salida, where the Stone was transferred to standard gauge gondola cars via a purpose built rotating 'barrel'.

Once the branch was converted to standard gauge, trains ran double-headed with D&RGW 4-axle EMD GP9s and in later days GP30s, GP35s and GP40s. During this period of operations, each train was broken up before the climb up the steep grades. 6-axle SD9s were tested on the branch but derailed due to the tight curves. Diesels assigned to the branch were given modified dynamic brakes to cope with the 4.5% grades. Dynamic brakes were of no use on the steep grades between Monarch and Maysville, which required the use of retainers (retaining valves on the air brake exhaust line). When making the air brake test (before leaving Monarch) the engineer would set the brakes and release them. The train crew would then ascertain that the brakes were still applied on the cars.
