= Rio Grande class C-19 =

Narrow-gauge steam locomotive class

Denver and Rio Grande C-19
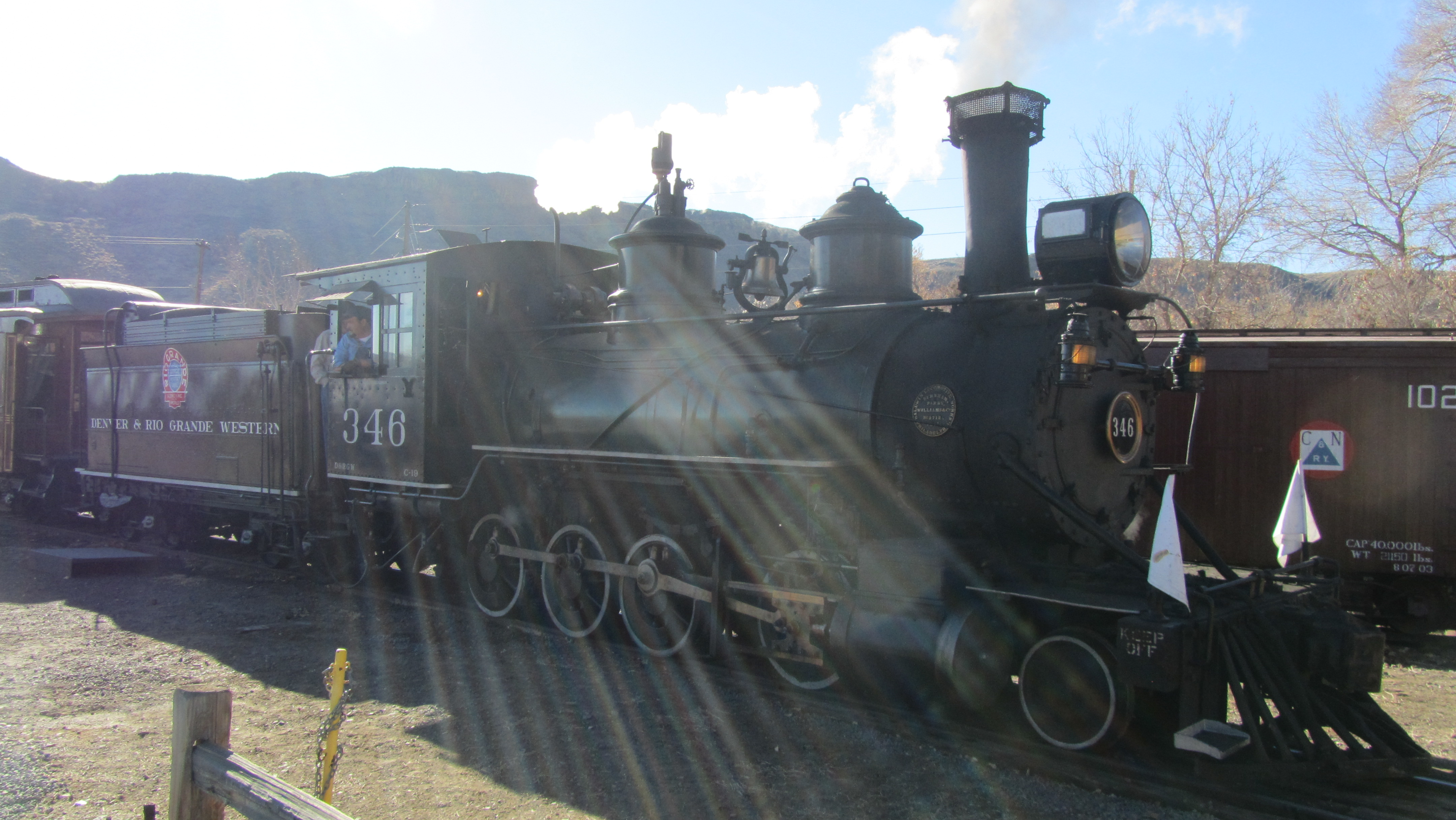
- D&RGW #346 at the Colorado Railroad Museum
Type and origin
- Power type: steam
- Builder: Baldwin Locomotive Works
- Model: 10-26 E
- Build date: 1881
- Total produced: 12
Specifications
- Configuration
  - Whyte: 2-8-0
  - UIC: 1D, 1'D
- Gauge: 3 ft (914 mm)
- Leading dia.: 24'
- Driver dia.: 36'
- Wheelbase: 18 ft 1 in
- Axle load: 19,790 lbs
- Service weight: 74,260 lbs
- Fuel type: Coal
- Fuel capacity: 12,000 lbs (coal)
- Water cap.: 2,500 us gal
- Valve gear: Stephenson
- Valve type: Piston valves
- Loco brake: Air
- Train brakes: Air
- Couplers: Knuckle
Performance figures
- Tractive effort: approx. 19,000 lbf (84.52 kN)
- Factor of adh.: 64,000 lbs
Career
- Operators: Denver and Rio Grande Western Railroad (historically); Rio Grande Southern (historically); Colorado Railroad Museum (current); Knotts Berry Farm (current)
- Class: D&RG: Class 70/74 D&RGW/RGS: C-19
- Numbers: D&RG: Nos. 400-411 D&RGW: Nos. 340-349 RGS: Nos. 40-41
- Retired: c. 1936-1951
- Preserved: Three: D&RGW #340, #346, and RGS #41
- Current owner: Colorado Railroad Museum, and Knotts Berry Farm
- Disposition: 3 preserved, 9 scrapped, 1 wrecked in a movie (Note: D&RGW No. 345 was intentionally damaged for a climactic scene in the film Denver and Rio Grande, along with C-18 No. 319; both engines were damaged beyond repair and ultimately scrapped.)

The Denver and Rio Grande Western C-19 (originally Denver and Rio Grande Class 70 or Class 74) is a class of 3 ft (914 mm) narrow-gauge 2-8-0 "Consolidation" type steam locomotives built for the Denver and Rio Grande Railroad (D&RG), later the Denver and Rio Grande Western Railroad (D&RGW) by the Baldwin Locomotive Works in 1881. These engines were built to supplement the smaller and weaker Class C-16, C-17 and C-18 2-8-0s.

By the end of the 1880s, five of these bigger narrow-gauge engines were converted to standard gauge, but by 1900, they all were converted back to narrow gauge. Two C-19s were purchased secondhand by the Rio Grande Southern Railroad as No. 40 and No. 41 respectively. As of today, only 3 C-19's exist in preservation, D&RGW No. 346 was the first C-19 to be preserved, as it was purchased by Robert W. Richardson, the founder of the Colorado Railroad Museum, while the other two (D&RGW No. 340 and RGS No. 41 respectively) were purchased for operation on Ghost Town & Calico Railroad on Knott's Berry Farm, in Buena Park, California.

== History ==
By 1886, after a period of financial difficulty and reorganization, the Denver and Rio Grande Railway was divided into two independent systems: the Denver and Rio Grande Railroad, which operated the Colorado lines, and the Rio Grande Western Railway, which took control of the Utah lines.

When the D&RG received its orders for the smaller Class 56 and Class 60 2-8-0 locomotives (later designated C-16s), the railroad began experimenting with larger and more powerful engines, such as the Class 70 (later C-19s), to handle the steep grades on the Marshall Pass route and to support construction of the San Juan Extension, which ran from Alamosa to Durango.

Five of the original Class 70s would be converted for standard gauge use, and the first standard gauge locomotives to be ever used by the D&RG up until that point. Though they would all be reverted to narrow gauge at the turn of the century.

After the Denver and Rio Grande merged with the Rio Grande Western, the combined company became the Denver and Rio Grande Western (D&RGW). After the reorganization, all the locomotives were redesignated based on their wheel arrangement and tractive effort. This gave the Class 70s a new designation of "C-19", the "C" stands for "Consolidation" and the 19 indicates 19,000lbs of tractive effort.

In November 1916, the Rio Grande Southern purchased three secondhand 2-8-0 locomotives from the Denver and Rio Grande. Two of them were Class C-19 engines (Nos. 40 and 41), while the third was a Class C-17 (formerly classified as a Class 74 before the 1921 reorganization) and was numbered 42. Of the two C-19s, No. 40 was wrecked beyond repair in a wreck with RGS No. 20 near Hesperus and was scrapped in 1943. No. 20 was repaired and sent back to service and is now preserved at the Colorado Railroad Museum. The remaining two 2-8-0s, Nos. 41 and 42, were later sold to Knott’s Berry Farm and the Colorado Railroad Museum, respectively.

As more powerful locomotives like the Rio Grande class K-27, K-36, and K-37 began to appear on the D&RGW mainlines. The older and diminutive 2-8-0s, including the C-19s, became increasingly obsolete and redundant; some remained as yard switchers but were largely withdrawn from service by the mid-1930s through the early-1940s, though some remained until the early 1950s.

== Locomotive roster ==
Number (D&RGW or RGS)	Original Number (D&RG)	Builder's Number	Disposition	Notes
D&RGW No. 340	D&RG No. #400	5571	Preserved and operational at Knott's Berry Farm on its Ghost Town & Calico Railroad since March 1952.	Originally named "Green River"
D&RGW No. 341	D&RG No. 402	5603	Scrapped in January 1939	Originally named "Shoshone" Conv. to Class 74 Std Gauge #800 on July 12, 1889 Conv. back to Class 74 NG D&RG 401 Jul 1898
D&RGW No. 342	D&RG No. 410	5755	Scrapped in October 1938	Originally named "Treasury Mountain" Conv. to Class 74 Std Gauge #801 on June 9, 1888 Conv. back to Class 70 NG D&RG 411 in Jul 1898
D&RGW No. 343	D&RG No. 403	5604	Scrapped on April 21, 1941	Originally named "Roaring Forks", later renamed "New Mexico" Leased to the Colorado and Southern Railway (1935-1937). Appeared, disguised as an Egyptian loco pulling an armored train, in The Light That Failed
D&RGW No. 344	D&RG No. 404	5630	Scrapped 1939	Originally named "Sevier"
D&RGW No. 345	D&RG No. 401	5572	Destroyed in a stunt for the movie Denver and Rio Grande in 1952	Originally named "Grand River" Conv. to Class 74 Std Gauge #803, March 28, 1889 Conv. back to Class 74 NG D&RG 405, Jun 1900
D&RGW No. 346	D&RG No. 406	5712	Preserved at the Colorado Railroad Museum	Originally named "Cumbres" Leased to the Colorado and Southern Railway (1935-1937) Wrecked on Kenosha Pass on July 25, 1936. Rebuilt and returned to D&RGW Apr 1937 (Note: D&RGW No. 346 was wrecked over Kenosha Pass while leased to the C&S. It was subsequently repaired and returned to the D&RGW.) Sold Montezuma Lumber May 19, 1947
D&RGW No. 347	D&RG No. 407	5713	Scrapped October 1938	Originally named "Old Rube"
D&RGW No. 348	D&RG No. 408	5730	Scrapped 1936	Originally named "Marshall Pass"
D&RGW No. 349	D&RG No. 405	5633	Scrapped 1940	Sold Dec-1926 As New Mexico Lumber Co #3
RGS No. 40	D&RG No. 411	5756	Damaged in a wreck and subsequently scrapped in 1943	Originally named "Quartz Creek" Later renamed "Gold Nugget" Conv. to Class 74 Std Gauge #802 in Dec 1888 Conv. back to Class 74 NG D&RG 402 in Jul 1898
RGS No. 41	D&RG No. 409	5731	Preserved and operational at Knott's Berry Farm	Originally named "Red Cliff," Later renamed "Red Buttes"

== Accidents ==
=== Accidents on the D&RG(W) ===
- Unknown date - D&RGW No. 340 overturns somewhere on the D&RGW or RGS right of way.
- July 25, 1936 - D&RGW No. 346, which was leased to the Colorado and Southern Railway at the time, became a runaway due to human error and crashed on Kenosha Pass. The fireman escapes unscathed, while the engineer dies of his wounds the very next day; No. 346 is repaired within a few weeks.

=== Accidents on the RGS ===
- August 31, 1943 - RGS No. 40 and 20 crash near Hesperus, No. 40 was damaged beyond repair and scrapped, while No. 20 was repaired and sent back to service.

== Preservation ==
Three C-19s are currently in preservation, whether they are in operation or storage. Two C-19s are operational on the Ghost Town & Calico Railroad, while the other is under a Federal Railroad Administration mandated overhaul at the Colorado Railroad Museum.

=== C-19s in Preservation ===
- D&RGW No. 340
- D&RGW No. 346
- RGS No. 41

=== Locations ===
- Colorado Railroad Museum
- Ghost Town & Calico Railroad

== In media ==
- D&RGW No. 343, disguised as an Egyptian loco pulling an armored train, appeared in The Light That Failed.
- D&RGW No. 345 was featured in the 1952 western, Denver and Rio Grande, and subsequently wrecked with another engine for a stunt.

== See also ==
=== Other D&RGW steam locomotives ===
- Rio Grande 315
- Rio Grande 223
- Rio Grande 268
- Rio Grande 168
- Rio Grande 169
- Rio Grande 463

=== Other D&RGW steam locomotive classes ===
- Rio Grande class K-27
- Rio Grande class K-28
- Rio Grande class K-36
- Rio Grande class K-37
