= Shavano (train) =

American passenger train

Overview
- Service type: Inter-city rail
- Status: Discontinued
- Locale: Colorado
- Last service: November 24, 1940
- Former operator: Denver and Rio Grande Western Railroad

Route
- Termini: Salida, Colorado; Gunnison, Colorado
- Train number: 315/316

The Shavano, named for nearby Mount Shavano, was operated by the Denver and Rio Grande Railroad. The passenger train ran between Salida and Gunnison, Colorado on the railroad's historic narrow gauge route over Marshall Pass. The Shavano operated as Train #315 westbound (to Gunnison), and #316 eastbound (to Salida).

== History ==
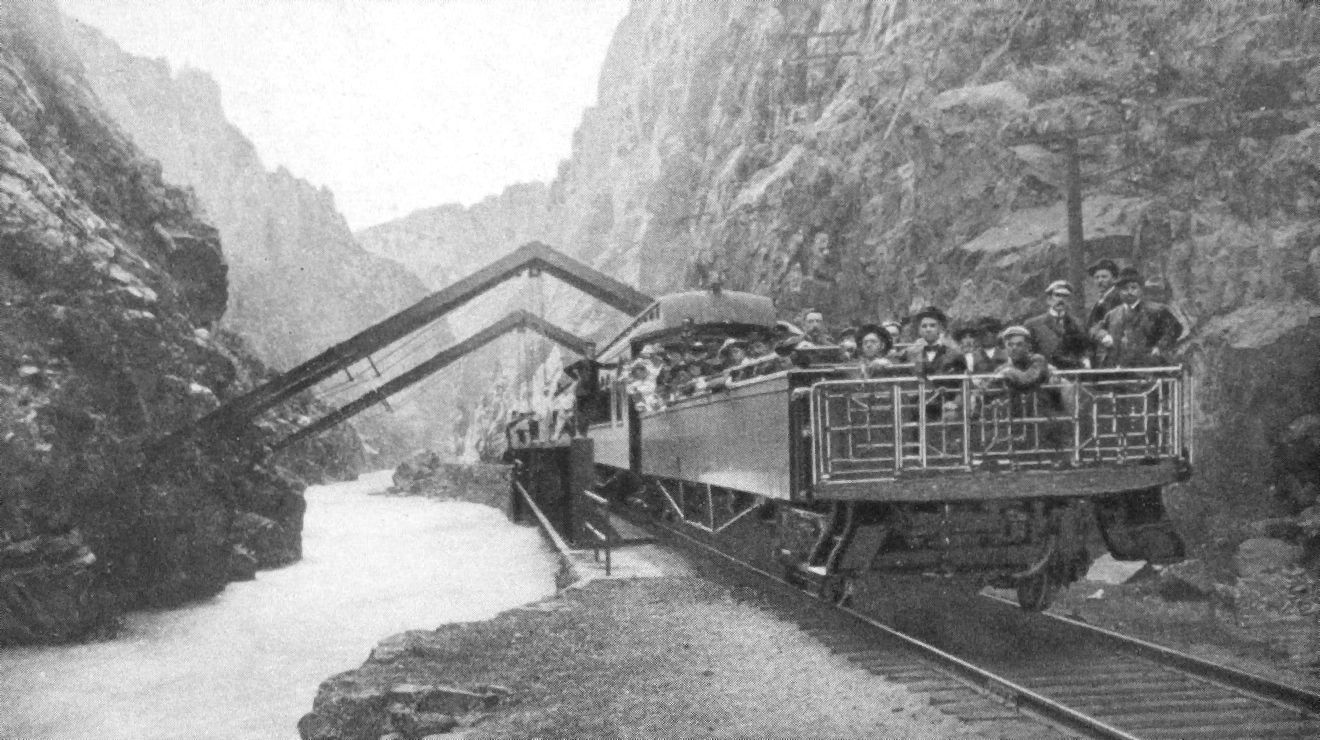
Unlike other lines with open observation cars for non first class passengers, the D&RGW operated theirs for an additional 25 cent charge. The cars were available during the summer months on both the Royal Gorge and the Black Canyon (Shavano) routes. The photo is from the Royal Gorge route and is circa 1917.

The original east-west main line of the Denver & Rio Grande, constructed in the 1870s and 1880s, was built as a narrow-gauge railroad, with the rails spaced three feet apart. The line ran from Denver south to Pueblo, and then turned west through the Royal Gorge to Salida. The route then continued over Marshall Pass to Gunnison, Montrose, and Grand Junction, before entering Utah and proceeding to Salt Lake City and Ogden. This existed as a through route only until 1890, when the main line was standard-gauged. The standard gauge route headed north from Salida via Tennessee Pass, rejoining the original narrow-gauge route at Grand Junction. This left the old narrow-gauge line over Marshall Pass as a local route. Narrow-gauge trains operated between Salida and Grand Junction until the Montrose-Grand Junction tracks were standard-gauged in 1906, truncating the narrow-gauge line to a Salida-Montrose route.

Narrow-gauge trains 315 and 316, carrying coaches and a parlor car, operated between Salida and Montrose until August 1936, when the Gunnison-Montrose portion of the route was discontinued. That autumn, however, the Rio Grande decided to upgrade its remaining narrow-gauge passenger trains, and renovated 38 passenger cars for use on its Salida-Montrose and Alamosa-Durango routes. The refurbishment included the addition of enclosed vestibules, the installation of electric lights and steam heating, and new interior seats and fixtures. The finished cars were perhaps the most comfortable and well-appointed narrow-gauge equipment in the United States.

The equipment renovation project was completed by the spring of 1937, and the new train entered service between Salida and Montrose on April 9. Dubbed the Shavano, the train included baggage and mail cars, coaches, and a parlor car. The Shavano operated westbound from Salida to Gunnison in the morning, returning in the evening; the schedule allowed through passengers to connect in Salida with an overnight standard-gauge train to Denver.

Despite the improvements made to the train, however, patronage was not sufficient to retain the service, particularly in light of the region's improving roads and increased automobile traffic. The Rio Grande discontinued the Shavano on November 24, 1940, ending rail passenger service to Gunnison and leaving the San Juan Express as the railroad's last daily narrow-gauge passenger train. The train's old route over Marshall Pass was completely abandoned by the railroad in 1955; most of the route is now an automobile road.
