= Durango and Silverton Narrow Gauge Railroad =

Heritage railroad in Colorado, US

Durango & Silverton Narrow Gauge Railroad Company

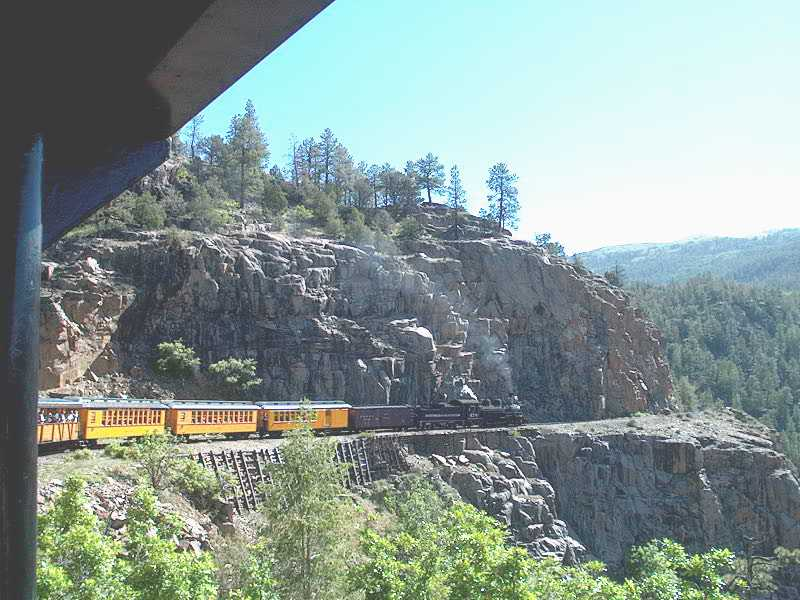
- Highline above Animas Canyon

Overview
- Main regions: La Plata County; San Juan County
- Parent company: American Heritage Railways, Inc.
- Headquarters: Durango, Colorado
- Locale: Colorado
- Dates of operation: 1881–present
- Predecessor: Denver and Rio Grande Western Railroad

Technical
- Track gauge: 3 ft (914 mm)
- Length: 45 miles (72 km)

Other
- Website: www.durangotrain.com
- Durango and Silverton Narrow Gauge Railroad
- U.S. National Register of Historic Places
- U.S. National Historic Landmark District
- Location within Colorado Location within the United States
- Coordinates: 37°17′51″N 107°52′14″W
- Built: 1882
- Architect: General William J. Palmer
- NRHP reference No.: 66000247

Significant dates
- Added to NRHP: October 15, 1966
- Designated NHLD: July 4, 1961

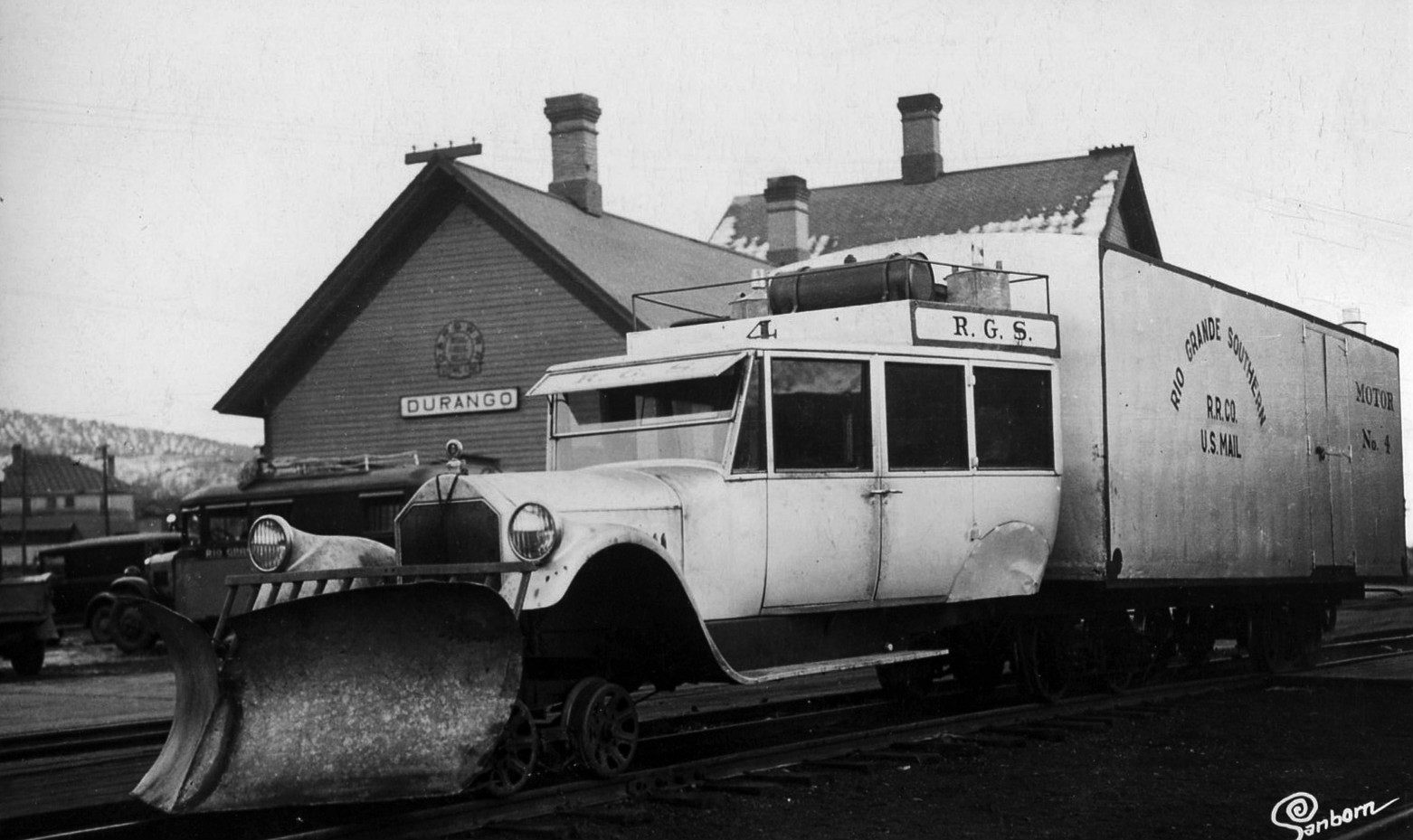
Galloping Goose #4 at the Durango station. Postcard photo taken circa 1945.

The Durango & Silverton Narrow Gauge Railroad Company, often abbreviated as the D&SNG, is a 3 ft (914 mm) narrow-gauge heritage railroad that operates on 45.2 miles (72.7 km) of track between Durango and Silverton, in the U.S. state of Colorado. The railway is a federally-designated National Historic Landmark District and was also designated by the American Society of Civil Engineers as a National Historic Civil Engineering Landmark in 1968. The line from Durango to Silverton has run continuously since 1881, although it is now a tourist and heritage line hauling passengers, and is one of the few places in the US which has seen continuous use of steam locomotives.

The route was originally opened in 1882 by the Denver and Rio Grande Railroad (D&RG) to transport silver and gold ore mined from the San Juan Mountains. The line was the "San Juan" extension of the D&RG 3 ft (914 mm) narrow-gauge line from Antonito, Colorado, to Durango. The last train to operate into Durango from the east was on December 6, 1968. The states of New Mexico and Colorado purchased 64 miles of track between Antonito and Chama, New Mexico, in 1970, which is operated today as the Cumbres and Toltec Scenic Railroad (C&TSRR). Trackage between Chama and Durango was removed by 1971 and the route is now the Tracks Across Borders Scenic and Historic Byway. In March 1981, the Denver and Rio Grande Western Railroad (D&RGW) sold the line and the D&SNG was formed.

Today, the D&SNG, along with the C&TSRR, are the only two remaining parts of the former D&RGW narrow-gauge network. The railroad has a total of ten narrow-gauge steam locomotives (eight of which are operational) and ten narrow-gauge diesel locomotives, six of which have been acquired since 2020, on its current roster.

Some rolling stock dates back to the 1880s. Trains operate from Durango to the Cascade Wye in the winter months and Durango–Silverton during the summer months. Durango depot was built in January 1882 and has been preserved in its original form.

== History ==
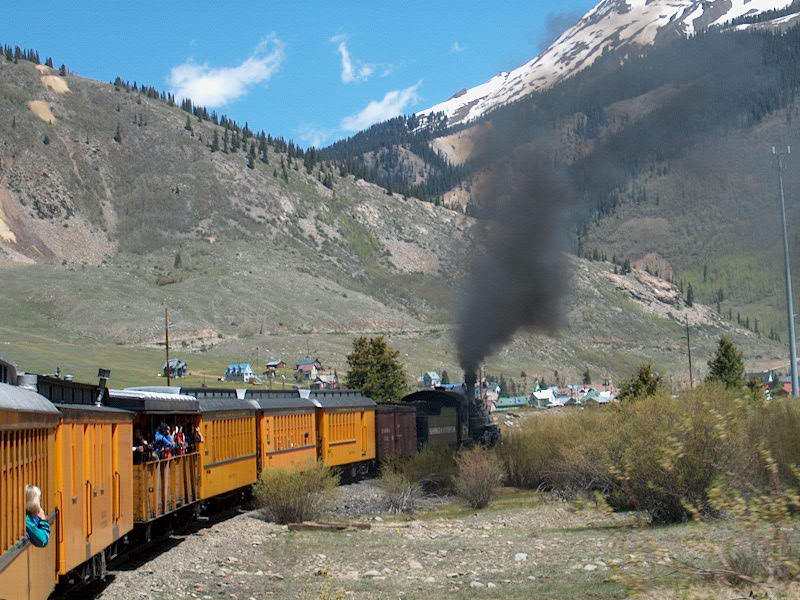
Train entering Silverton

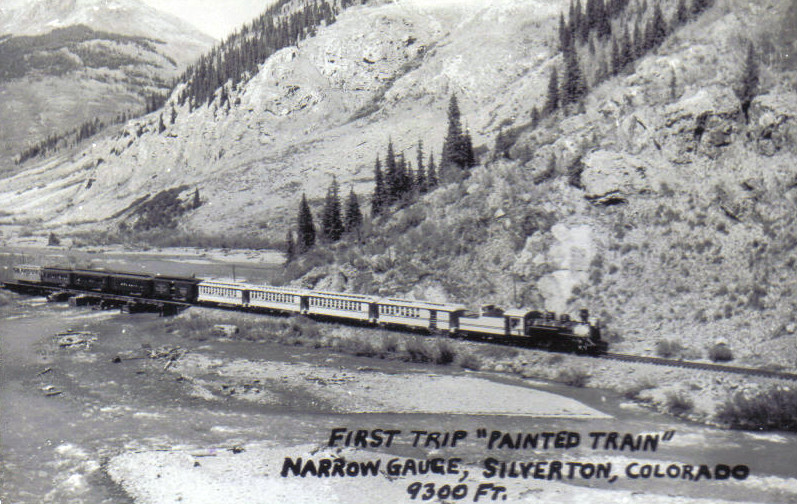
Photo of the first trip of the "Painted Train", circa 1950

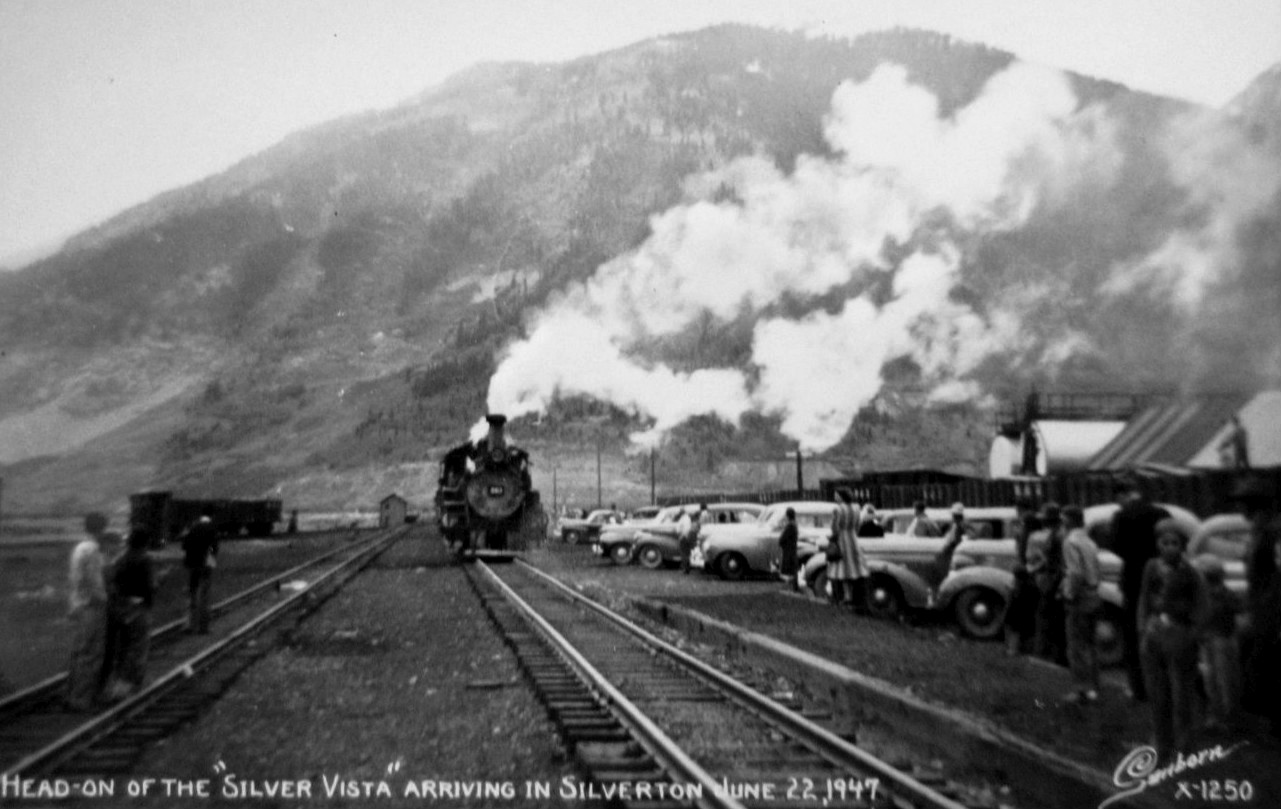
The D&RG Silverton arrives, pulling the glass-topped "Silver Vista" observation car in 1947.

William Jackson Palmer (1836–1909) was a former Union General (serving in the American Civil War) who came to Colorado after managing the construction of the Kansas Pacific Railway into Denver in 1870. Prior to the war, he had risen within the ranks of the Pennsylvania Railroad, serving as secretary to the president. After arriving in Denver, he formulated a plan to build a 3 ft (914 mm) narrow-gauge railroad southward from Denver to El Paso, Texas (see Denver and Rio Grande Western Railroad). In 1871, the Denver & Rio Grande Railway began to lay rails south from Denver. Palmer and his associates had agreed that the choice of 3 ft (914 mm) narrow-gauge would be well suited to the mountainous country, and relatively less expensive construction costs would enhance the viability of the new railroad. The original north–south plans of the D&RG eventually expanded to include extensions throughout the booming mining country of central and southwestern Colorado.

In July 1881, the Denver & Rio Grande reached Durango and started building the final 45-mile stretch, which only took nine months and five days. The labor crew, made up of mostly Chinese and Irish immigrants, were paid $2.25 per day. At least 500 laborers worked the narrow gauge railroad. The first 18 miles to Rockwood were completed by late November. The remainder of the route entered the narrow Animas Canyon, which has steep granite walls. They blasted the canyon cliffs off and left a narrow, level shelf to lay the tracks on. Grading was completed by late spring 1882.

The D&RG reached Silverton on July 10, 1882. The town's name was coined by a miner who said that silver could be mined by the ton Trains hauling passengers and freight began immediately. The D&RG soon re-emerged as the Denver and Rio Grande Railroad (1886) and ultimately began operating as the Denver and Rio Grande Western Railroad (D&RGW) on July 31, 1921, after re-organization of the Colorado lines and Rio Grande Western of Utah. Eventually, the railroad became widely known as the "Rio Grande".

The Silverton branch, as it became known, struggled under D&RG ownership following the Panic of 1893 and the end of free coinage of silver. Typical of many portions of the surviving narrow-gauge branches into the middle of the twentieth century, the line faced sagging revenue due to ever-declining mining ventures, highway trucking competition and insignificant passenger revenue. Annual snowslides and several major floods on the branch would only continue to challenge the railroad's ability to survive.

=== The Silverton ===
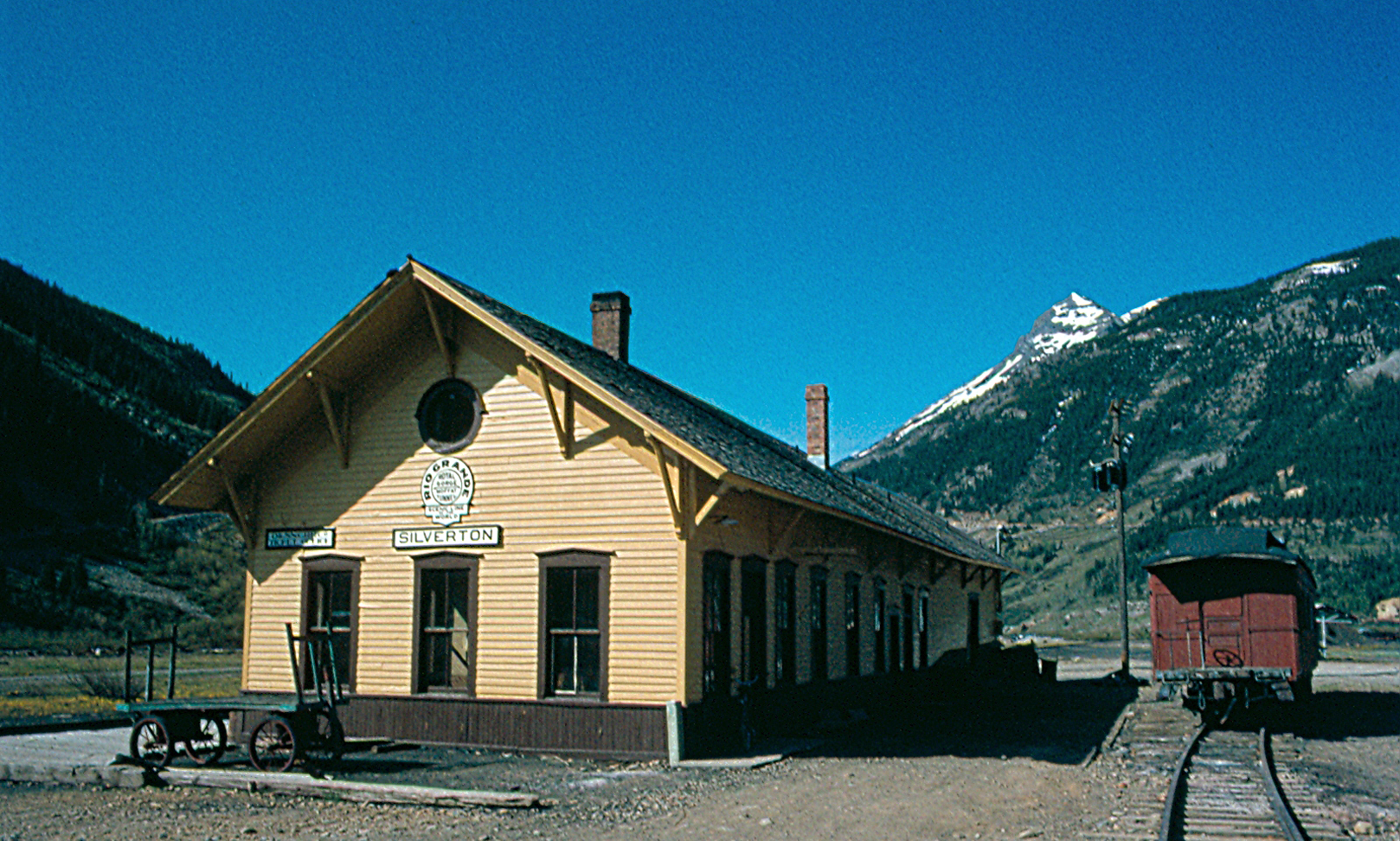
The historic Silverton Depot in 1982

After World War II, domestic tourism began to grow across the country and the Silverton branch of the railroad would benefit. Bolstered by national exposure via Hollywood movies being filmed along the line in the late 1940s, the railroad created The Silverton, a summer-only train service, on June 24, 1947. A short time later, the railroad adorned a locomotive and four coaches with a colorful yellow paint scheme and launched modest public promotion. With this effort, "The Painted Train" officially started a new era of tourism that continues to this day. Freight traffic, however, continued to decline, and during the 1950s The Silverton operated as a mixed train.

By the 1960s, a modernized D&RGW did not see the Silverton Branch as worthy to maintain and a petition was filed with governmental agencies to abandon it. The Interstate Commerce Commission declined to grant the request due to the continued increase in tourist patronage. Following the ICC's ruling, the railroad reluctantly responded by investing in additional rolling stock, track maintenance and improvements to the Durango depot. The railroad purchased some of the property around the depot, cleaned up the block extending north to Sixth Street and facilitated the opening of gift shops and other tourist-friendly businesses. As ridership continued to grow, the D&RGW operated a second train to Silverton on certain days.

=== 1970s ===
Since 1971, the Silverton branch and nearby Cumbres and Toltec Scenic Railroad (C&TSRR) were the only remnants of the Rio Grande's once extensive narrow-gauge system. During the late 1970s, the D&RGW was actively trying to sell the Silverton branch and, in 1979, Charles Bradshaw, a Florida citrus grower, offered the railroad a legitimate opportunity to divest itself of the now-isolated route. On October 5, 1980, The Silverton made its last run under D&RGW ownership and, after operating a work train the following day, the railroad finally concluded its 3 ft (914 mm) narrow-gauge train operations, bringing to a close an era that began 110 years earlier with its narrow-gauge railroad from Denver to Colorado Springs.

== New ownership ==
The D&SNG was founded by Charles Bradshaw Jr., of Florida, with the intent of purchasing the right-of-way and equipment while expanding the infrastructure and passenger revenue. His plans were fulfilled with the March 25, 1981, acquisition of the D&RGW's 45-mile (72 km) Silverton branch and all of its structures and rolling stock.

The improvements to the railroad in the 1980s would prove to be the most dramatic growth on the Silverton Branch since the earlier part of the century. Bolstered by the assistance of former Rio Grande operating managers and a relatively sizeable staff of new employees, Bradshaw's plans were set in motion immediately. Included in the sale were former D&RGW locomotives and rolling stock that had not seen service in Durango for many years. "K-36" and "K-37" class locomotives were eventually restored to operating condition, and these larger classes of engines operated to Silverton for the first time ever following bridge and right-of-way improvements to the line. 1880s vintage coaches were exquisitely restored and new coaches were added to the roster of rolling stock. For the first time in many years, double-headed trains (trains with two locomotives) and additional scheduled trains, beyond the former summer-only passenger trains operated by the Rio Grande, were employed to handle the continually-growing passenger trade. The Durango yard facilities also saw dramatic improvements. An extension was added to the old roundhouse, a new car shop was built on the site of the original "car barn", and the depot saw extensive repair and internal modifications. The workforce grew with the railroad, and Durango's tourist image expanded as new businesses and revamping of the old railroad town continued to take shape. The original 1881 Durango roundhouse was completely destroyed by fire in the winter of 1989. All six operable locomotives had been inside at the time and were damaged, but not beyond repair. All locomotives were eventually restored to operating condition. A new roundhouse was constructed on the same site, opening in early 1990, and its facade made use of bricks salvaged from the original building.

In March 1997, Bradshaw sold the D&SNG to First American Railways, Inc., located in Hollywood, Florida. Then, in July 1998, the railroad was sold again, to American Heritage Railways. At the time, American Heritage Railways was headquartered in Coral Gables, Florida. Since then, its headquarters were moved to Durango, Colorado. The D&SNG has two museums, one each in Durango and Silverton.

=== 2000s to present ===
Departure from Durango station, 2015

In June 2018, the railroad shut down for several weeks due to a wildfire, named the "416 Fire", which was fought by two air tankers, six helicopters and some 400 firefighters on the ground. An estimated 54,129 acres (21,905 ha) of the San Juan National Forest were burned, with losses estimated at more than $31 million. Given the fire risk from coal cinder-sparked wildfires, the railroad's owner plans to invest several million dollars to replace coal-power with oil-power for its steam locomotives and has acquired two new narrow-gauge diesel locomotives. The railroad's coal-burning steam locomotives were suspected of sparking the "416 Fire" blaze, and some area businesses and residents filed a civil lawsuit against the railroad and its owner in mid-September 2018.

As of 2023, the railroad aims to have most, if not all, of its operational steam locomotives converted from coal to oil-burning.

The railroad closed for several months in 2020 due to the COVID-19 pandemic.

=== Management ===
- Allen C. Harper — owner and CEO
- Carol Harper — owner and president
- Jeff Johnson — general manager
- John Harper — senior vice president
- Cathy Swartz — CFO

== Museums ==
The D&SNG operates two museums, the D&SNG Museum and the Silverton Freight Yard Museum. They both feature historic railway equipment used on the D&RGW line.

=== D&SNG Museum ===
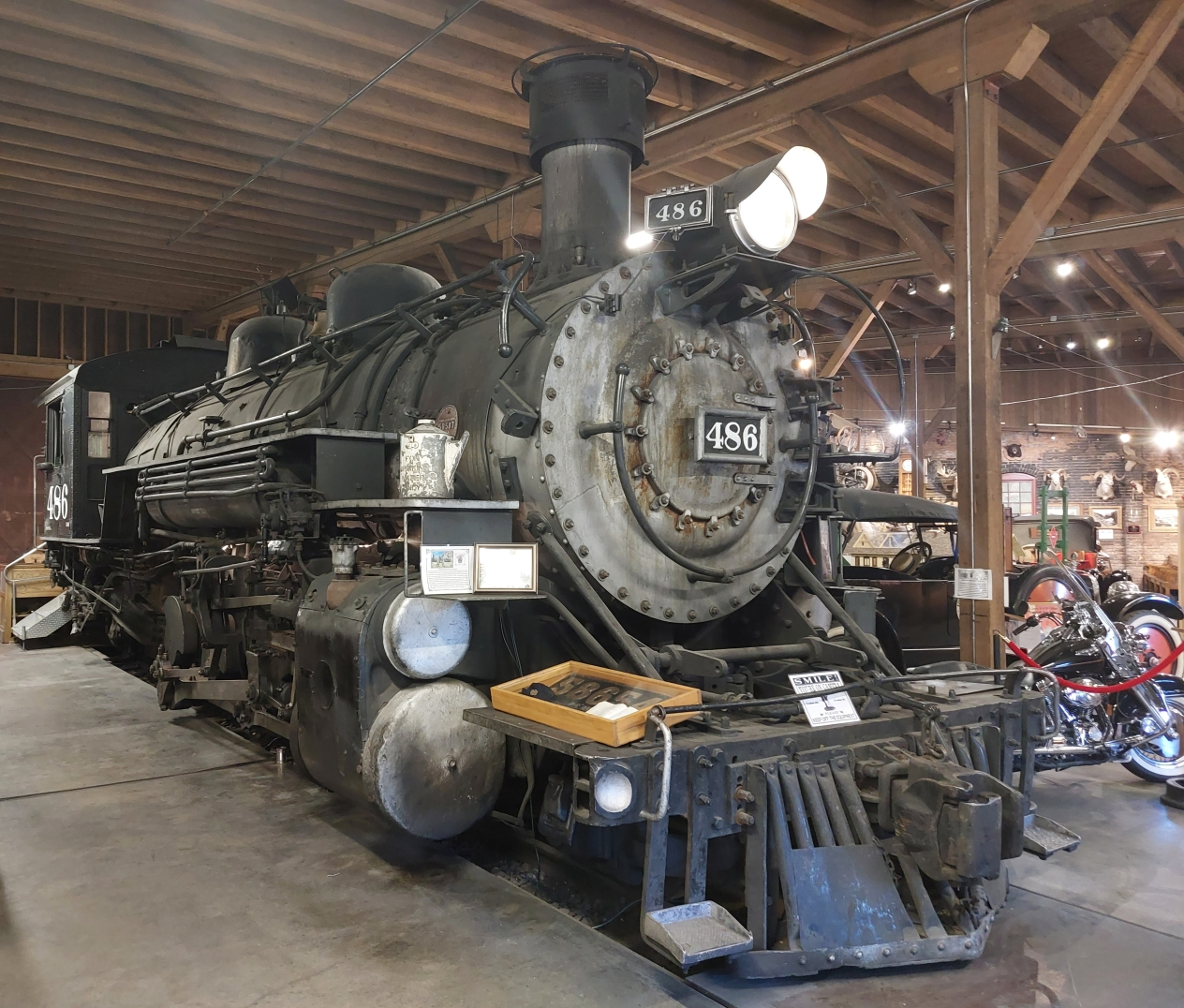
Engine 486 in the D&SNG Museum, 2024

Opened in 1998, the D&SNG Museum is a tribute to railroading nationally and southwest Colorado. The museum is located in the Durango roundhouse. Half the roundhouse is used for the steam engines and the other half is for the museum. The museum features memorabilia from the D&RGW and other railroads. It also features many artifacts from the Durango and Silverton areas. There is an HO train layout in the museum. It depicts a narrow-gauge railroad similar to the D&RGW. There is also a movie coach that was used in the filming of Butch Cassidy and the Sundance Kid, where the railroad's informational and educational films are featured.

==== Class 70 Engine No. 42 ====
On display in the Durango and Silverton RR Museum, engine 42 was one of 6 class-70 2-8-0 locomotives built by Baldwin in 1887 for the D&RG. The engine weighs 35 tons and pulls with 17,100 lbs of tractive effort. It was originally numbered 420. In November 1916 the engine was sold to the Rio Grande Southern and was used till the RGS was dismantled in 1952. Engine 42 and a caboose running from Grady, located east of Mancos, Colorado to Durango was the last train movement on the RGS. In 1953 the engine was sold to the Narrow Gauge Motel in Alamosa. In 1958 the 42 was sold to Magic Mountain Amusement Park in Golden, Colorado, where it was converted to burn fuel oil and operated for a short time. In 1968 the Woodmoor Corporation purchased the Magic Mountain property and in 1969 put engine 42 on display in Monument, Colorado, at the entrance to its Woodmoor subdivision. In 1971 engine 42 returned to Golden as a restaurant display at Heritage Square. Finally, in 1983 it was purchased and brought to Durango. It has never been restored to operating condition. It is on display in the museum.

==== Baggage Car No. 127 ====
Originally built as flat car No. 6630, it was rebuilt in 1968 as a baggage car for the film Butch Cassidy and the Sundance Kid. No. 127 was the third concession car built by the D&SNG. It saw limited service and acted as a backup concession car. No. 127 is now used as a movie theater in the museum.

Museum exhibits

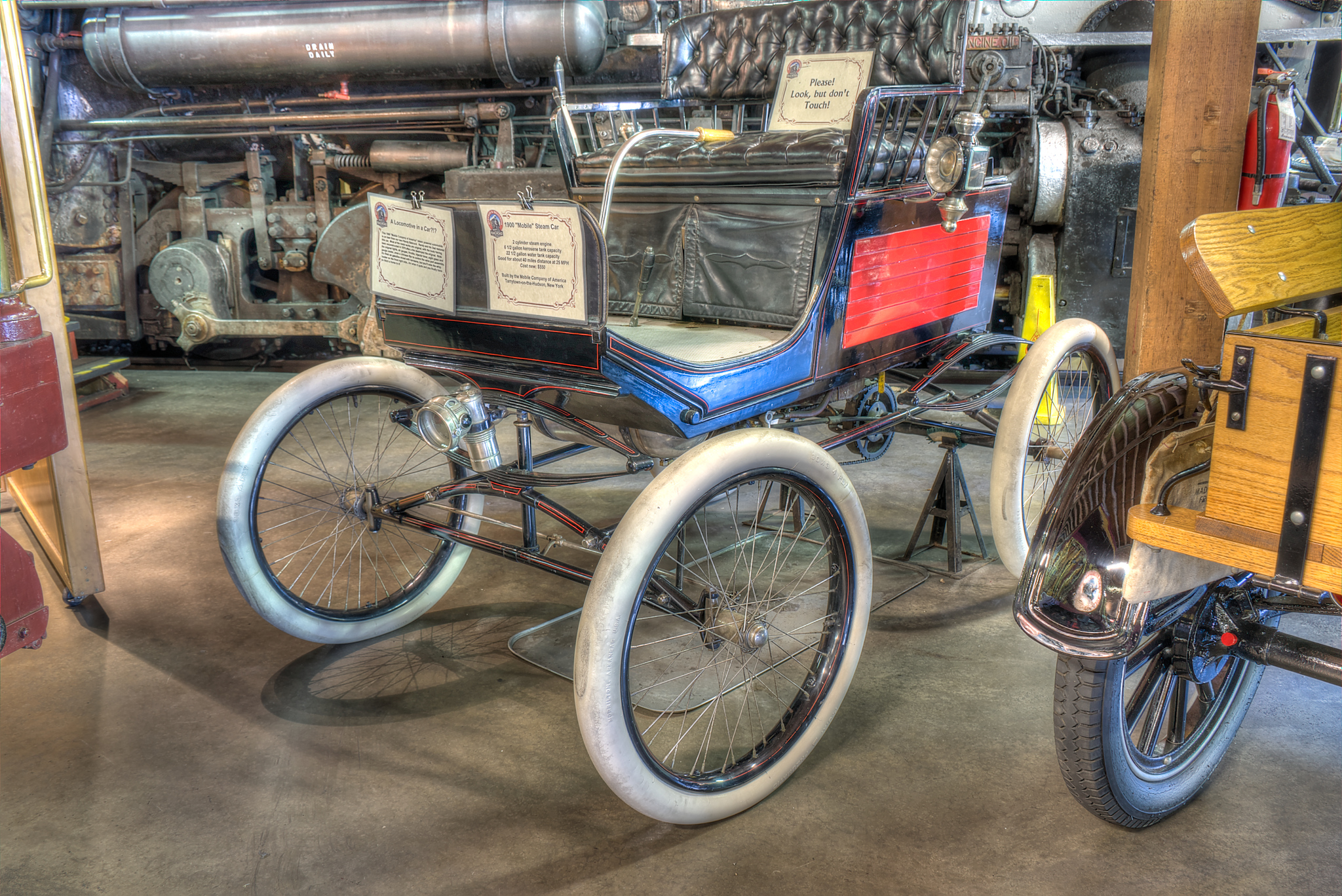
1900 Mobile steam car

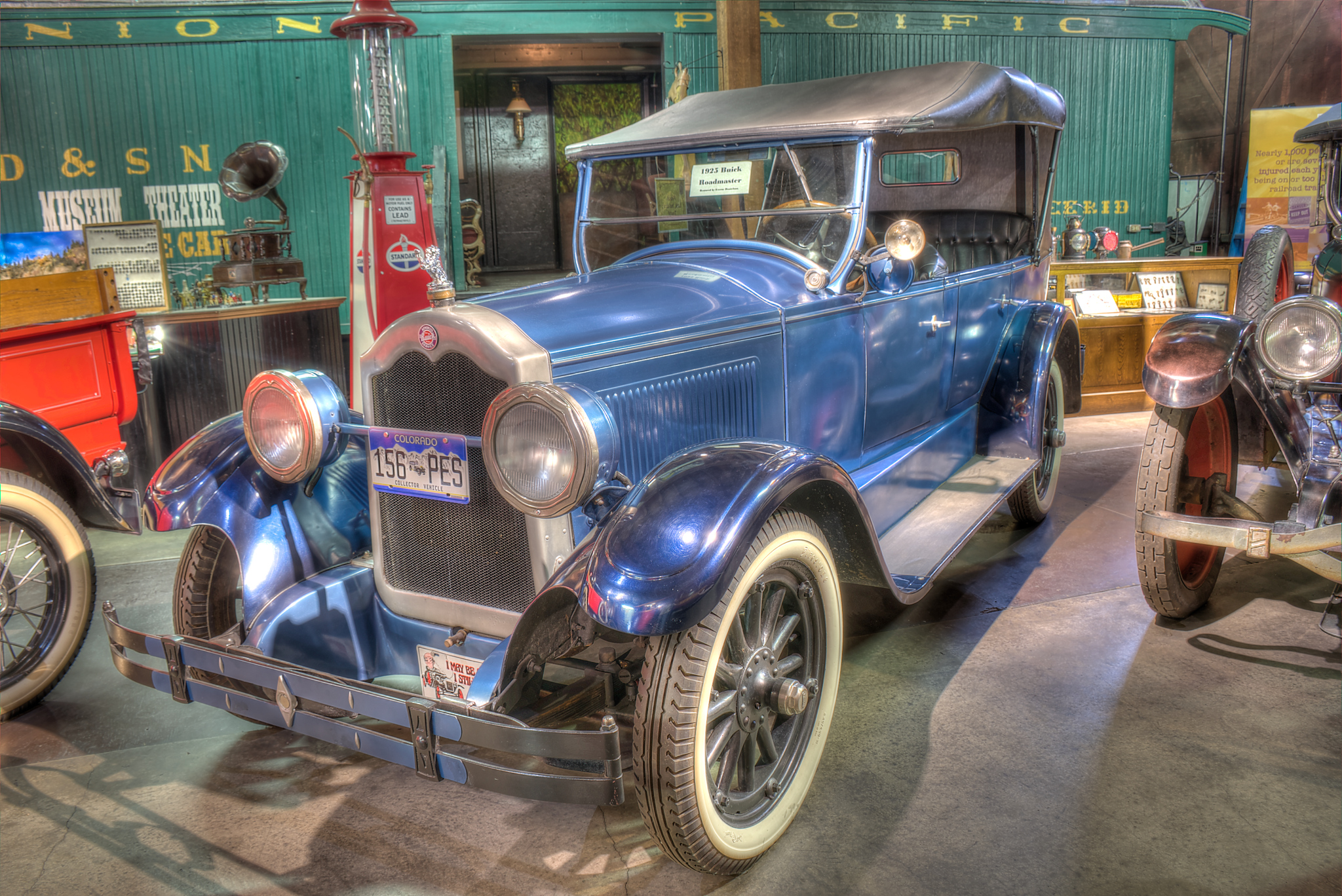
1925 Buick Roadmaster

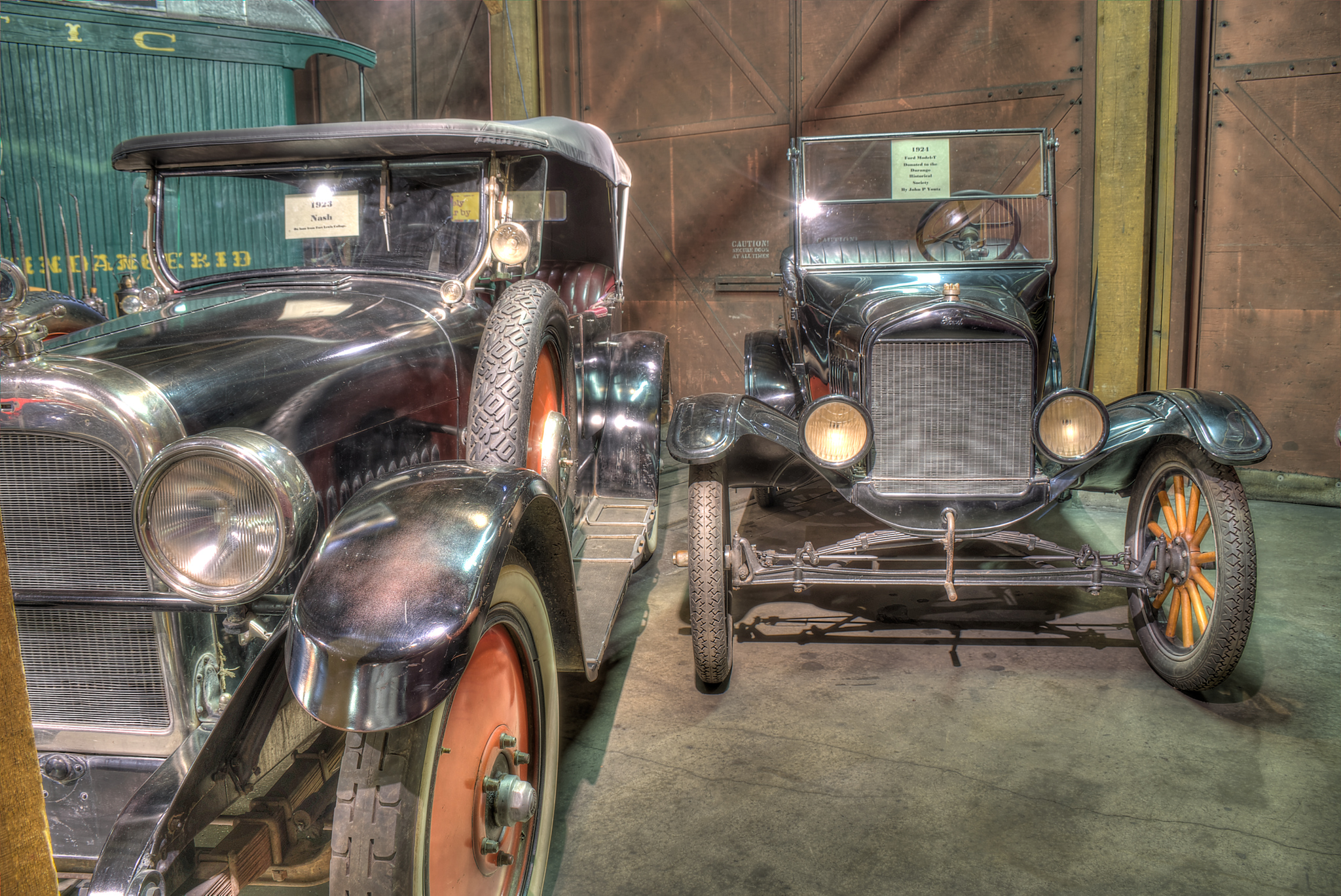
1923 Nash Roadster (left) and 1924 Model T Ford (right)

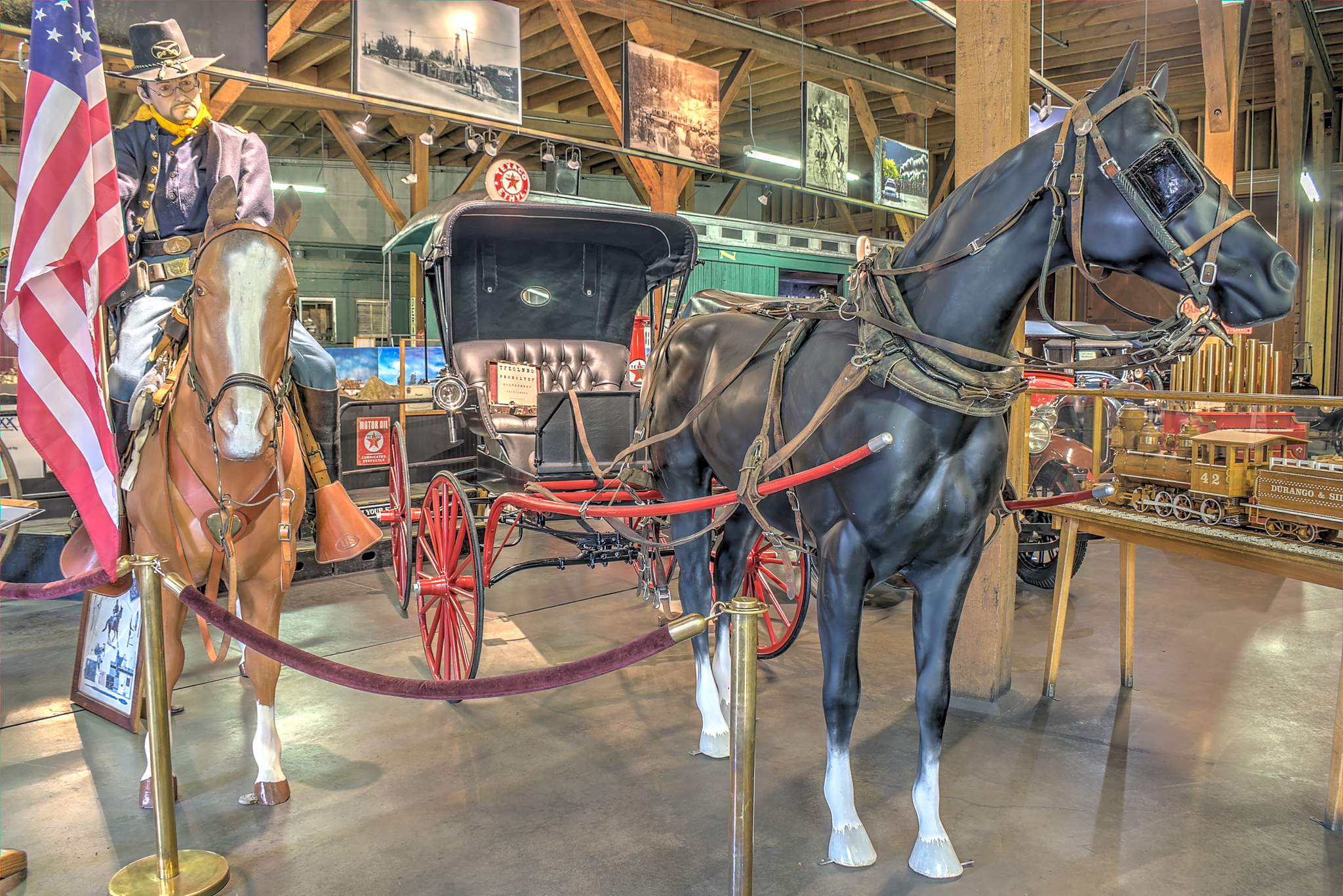
Sears & Roebuck buggy from the 19th century

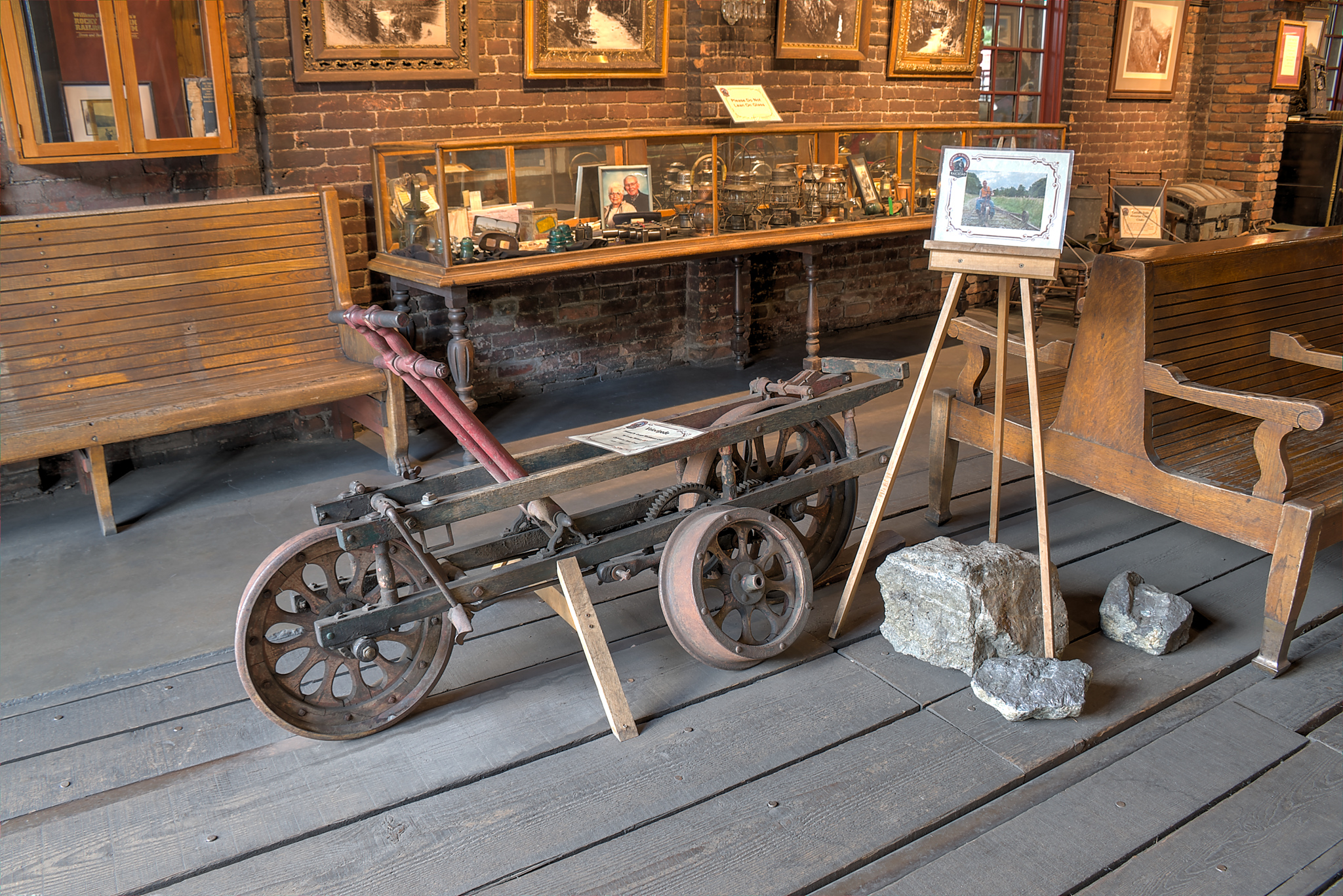
railroad velocipede

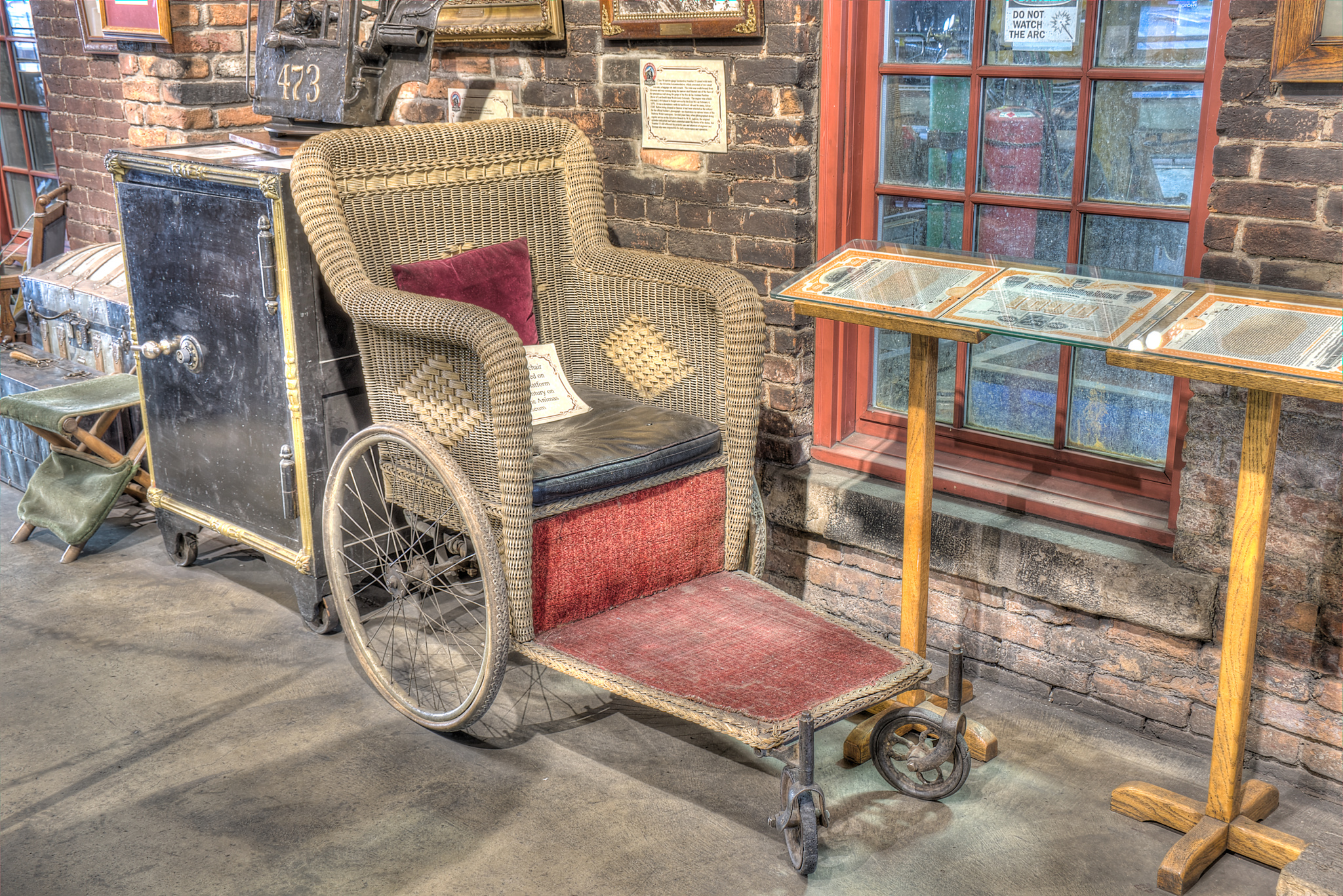
19th century wheelchair

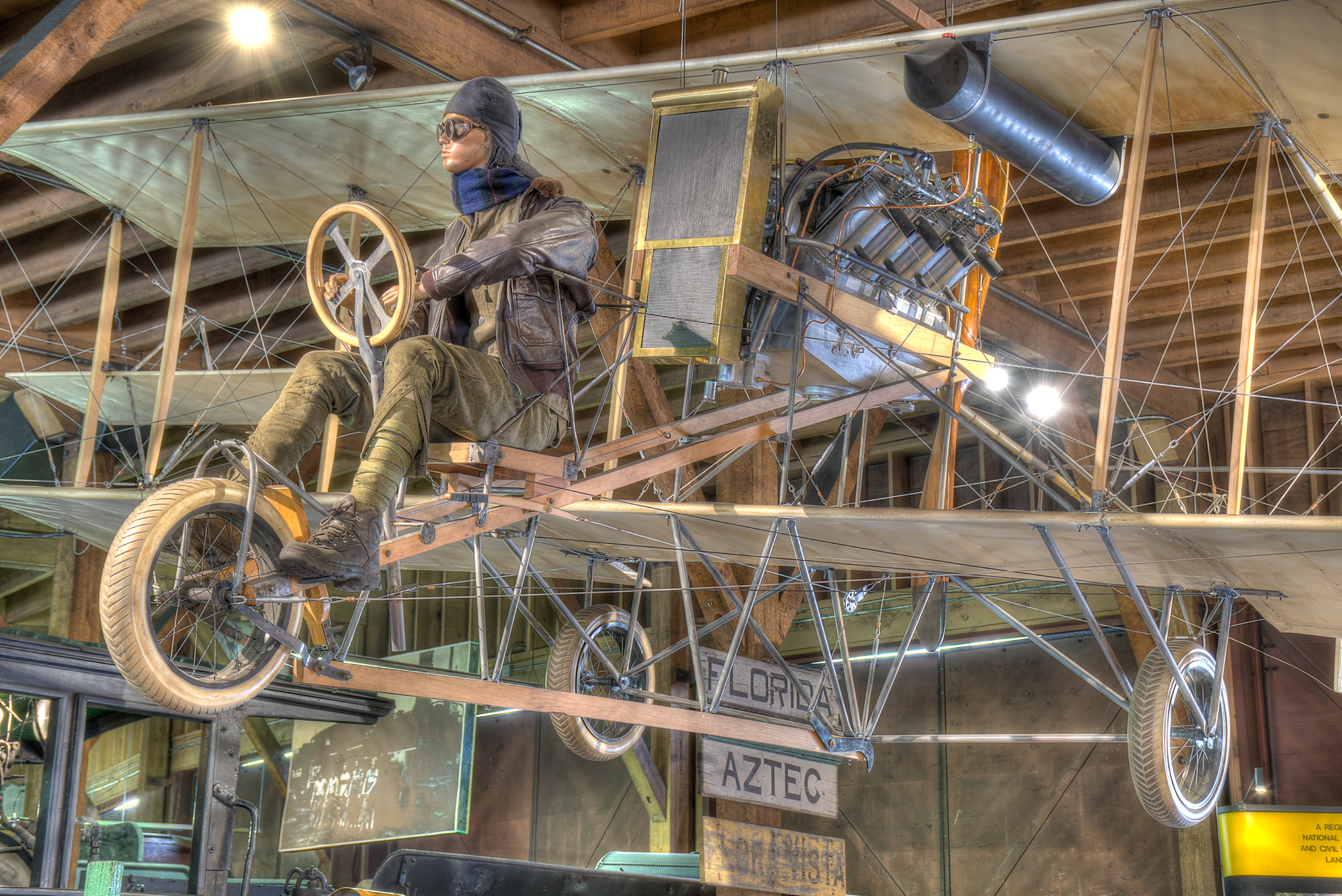
1911 Curtiss Model D

=== Silverton Freight Yard Museum ===
The Silverton Freight Yard Museum was opened in 1999 and is located at the Silverton depot and rail yard. On display are outfit cars, some equipped with kitchen facilities and side-dumped gondolas. In the Silverton depot are local artifacts.

Museum exhibits

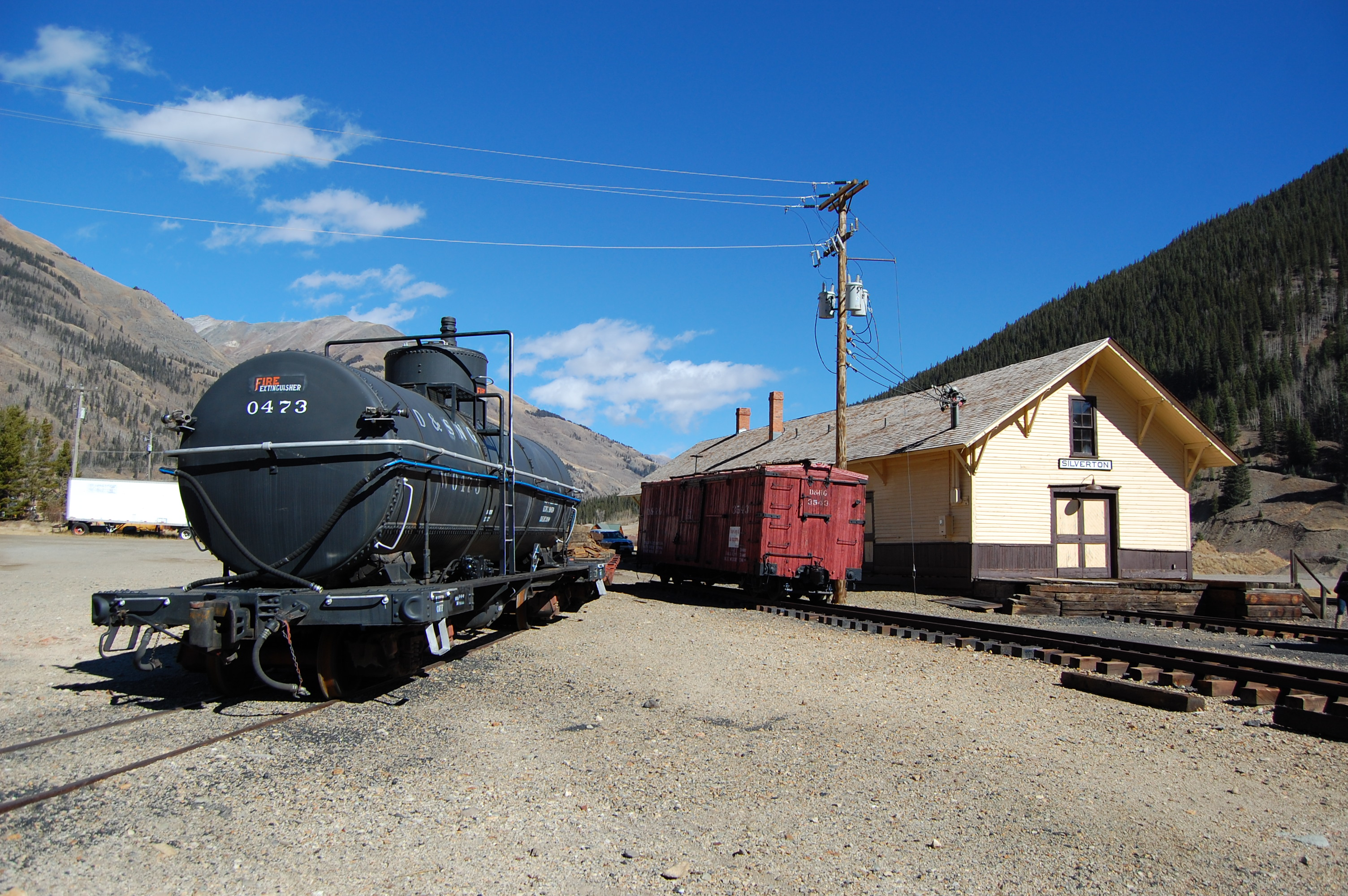
D&SNG W0473 and D&RG 3543 on display, Silverton, October 2012

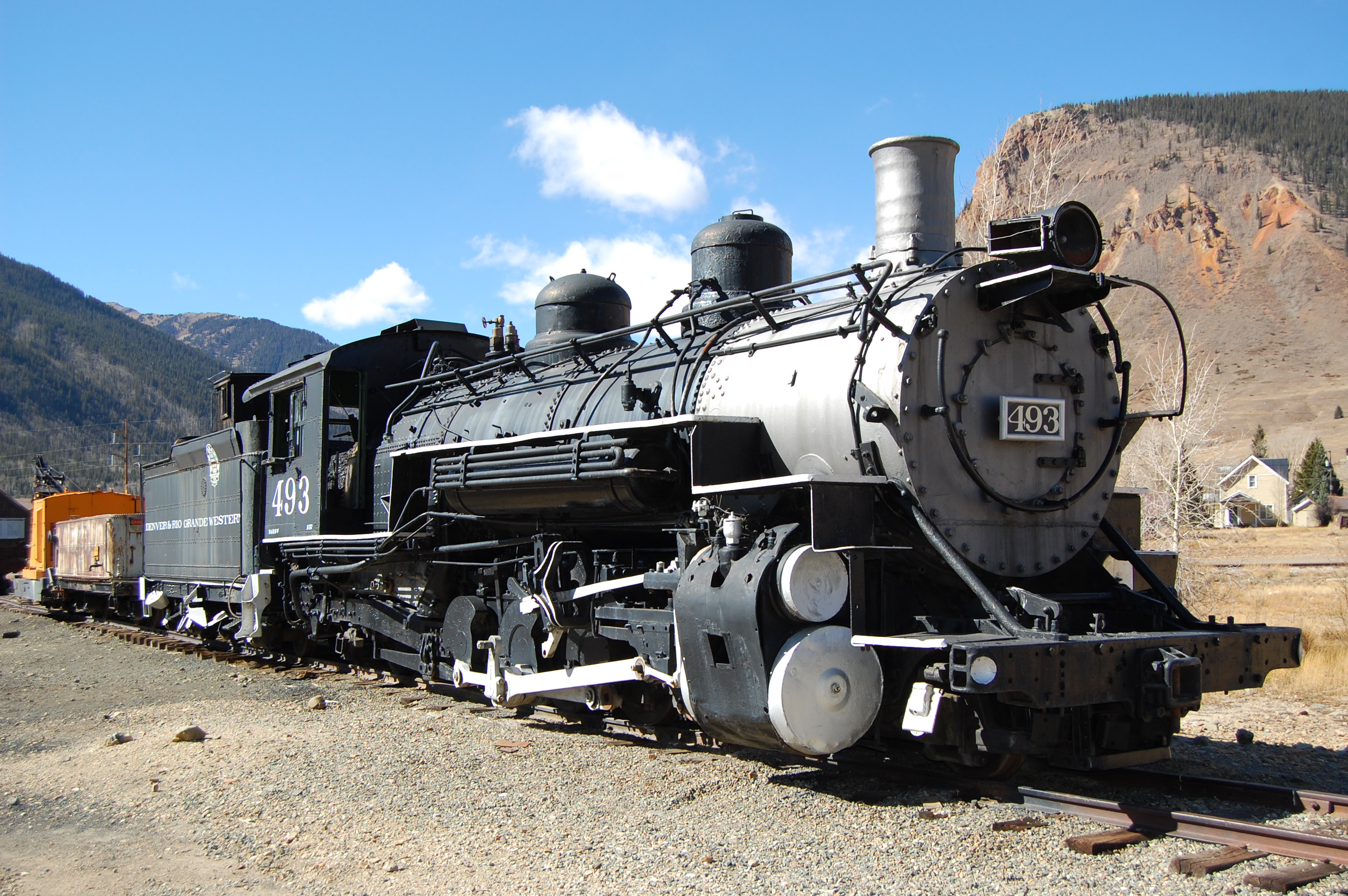
K-37 steam locomotive #493 on display before its restoration to operation, Silverton, October 2012.

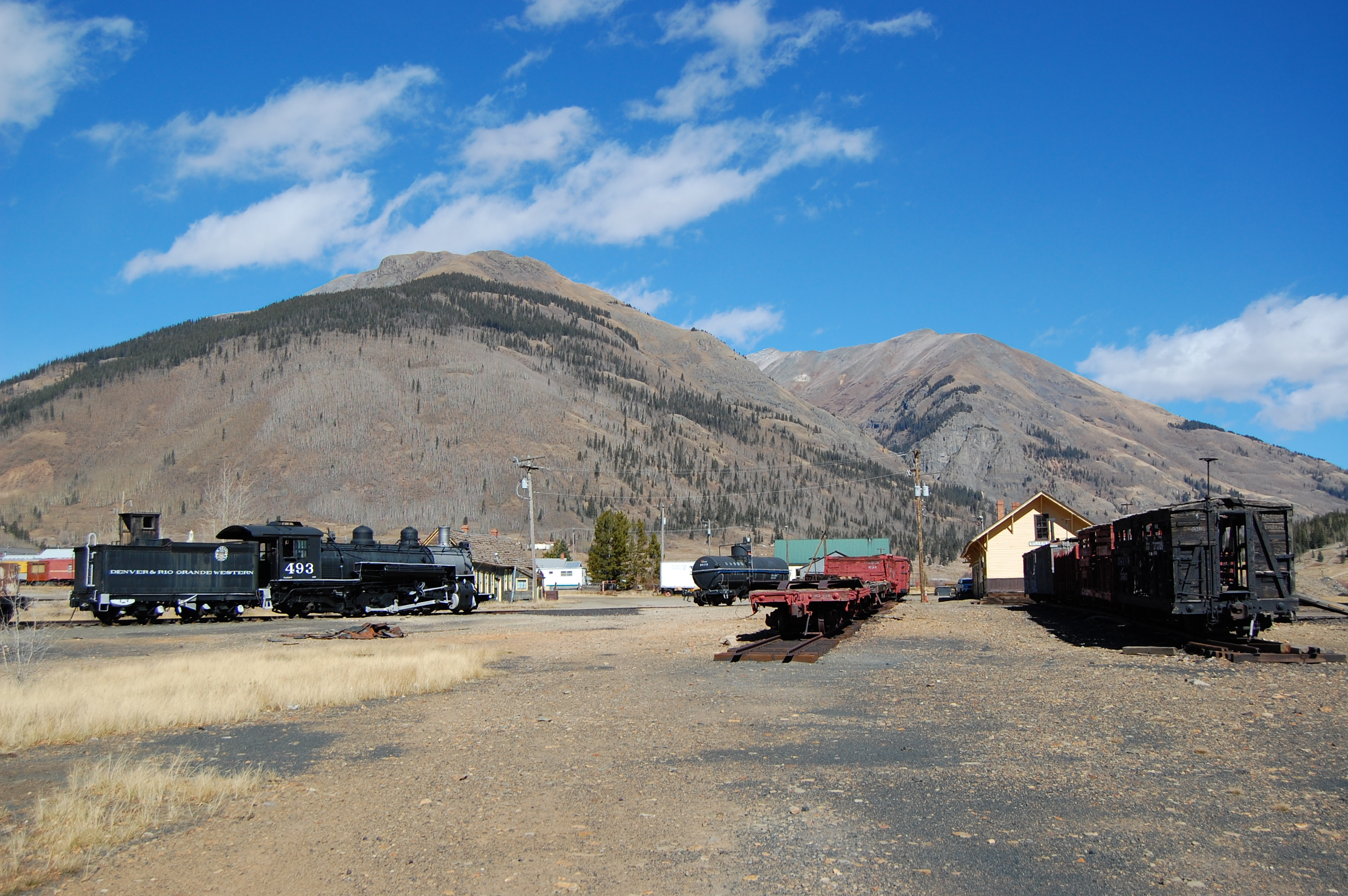
Freight Yard Museum in Silverton, October 2012

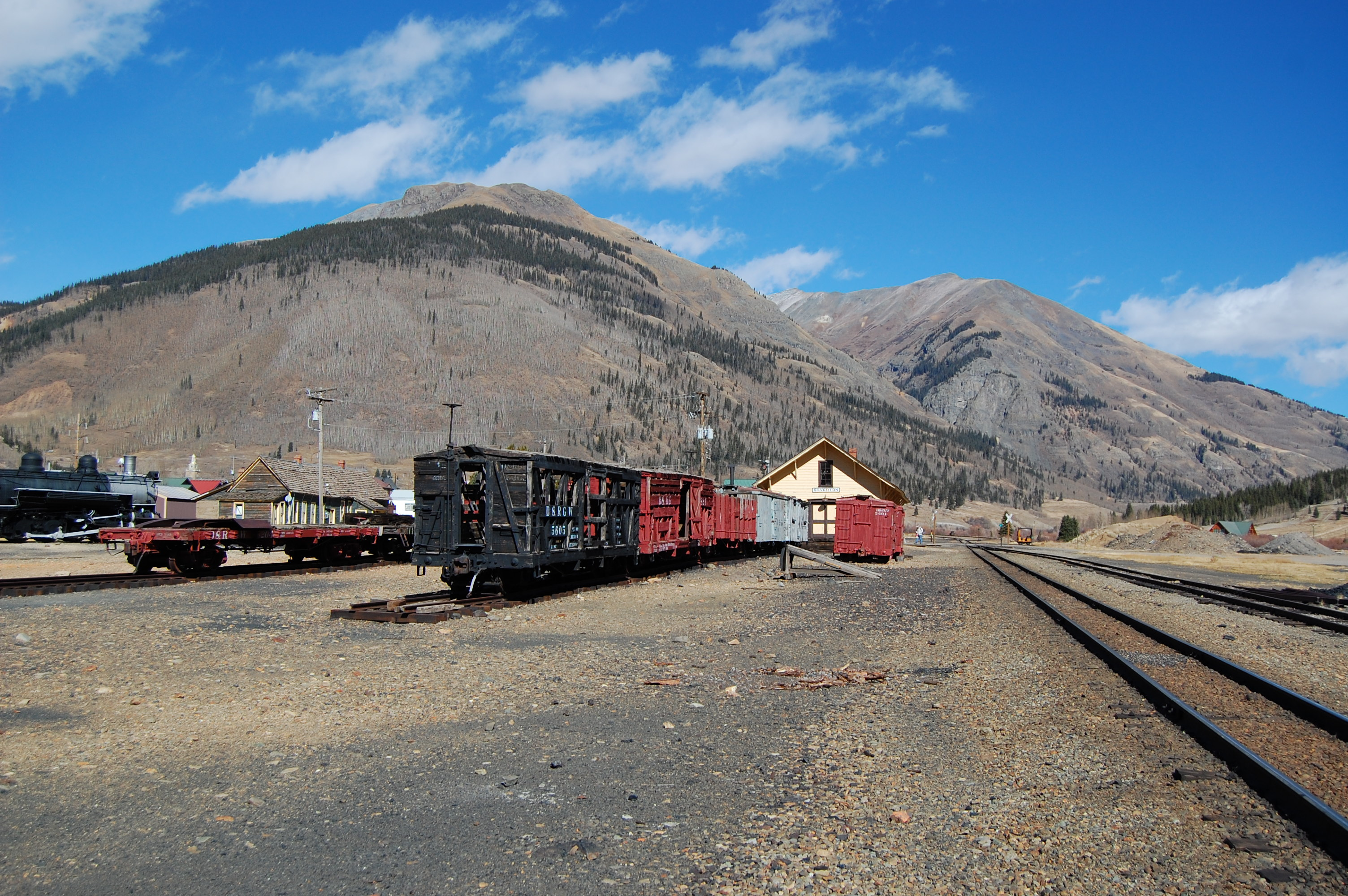
Freight Yard Museum with the Silverton depot, October 2012

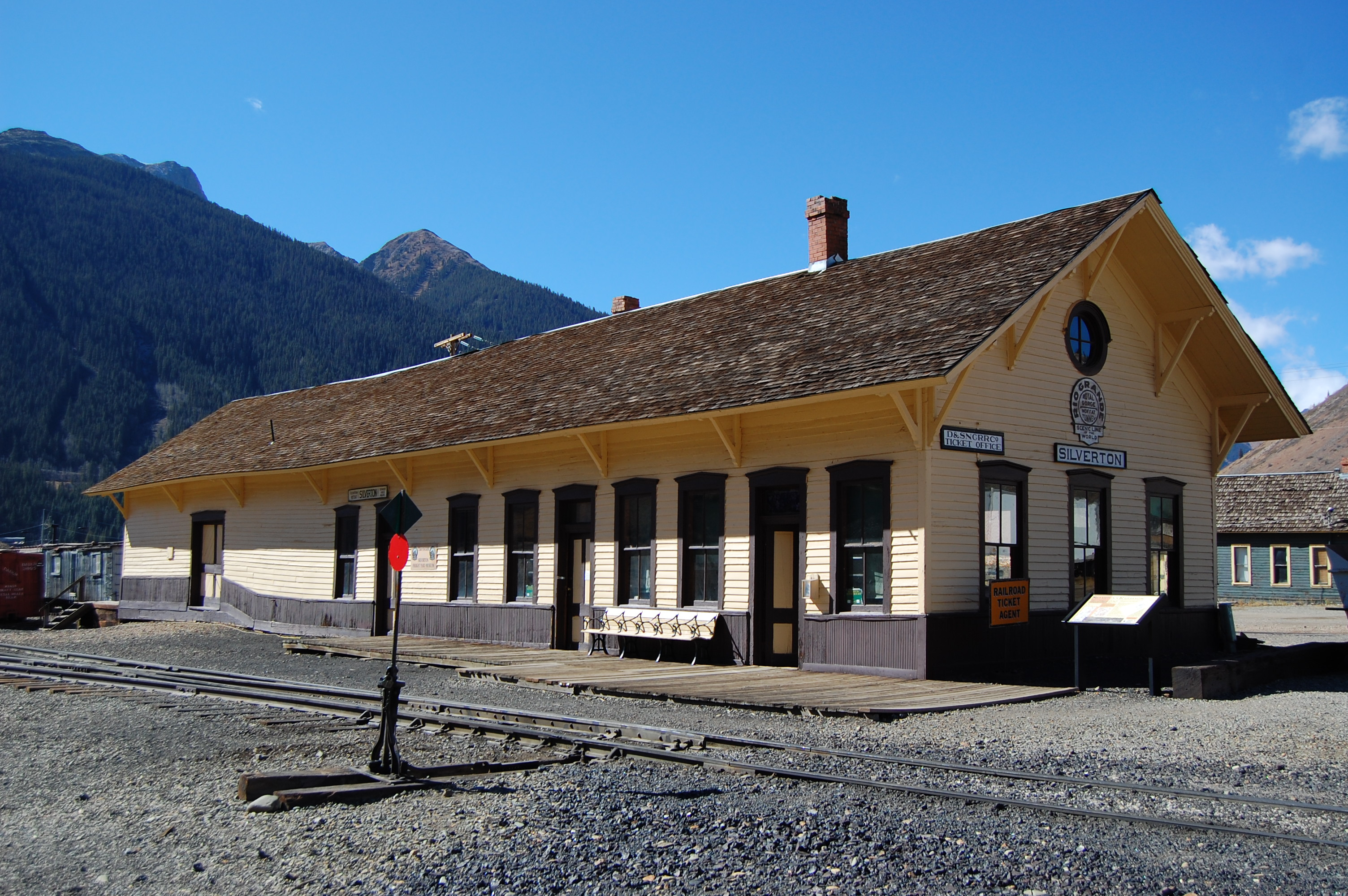
The Silverton Depot on October 25, 2012

== Animas River Railway ==
Beginning May 7, 1988, a new diesel-hydraulic motorcar and trailer railbus began making trips out of Rockwood, Colorado up the Animas canyon. The new company Animas River Railway was incorporated by the D&SNG, as an attempt to preserve the integrity of its own claim of "100% coal-fired steam locomotives". The railbus hauled hikers and fishermen into the canyon from Rockwood. Operations for the Animas River Railway were run out of Rockwood. Former mail baggage car 66 was used as the ticket window, office and waiting room for the railway.

Built in the winter of 1987–88, motorcar 1001 was named Tamarron. It could seat 32 people and had a 300-horsepower (220 kW) six-cylinder Caterpillar engine. It also had a baggage compartment and restroom. The trailer 1002 could seat 48 in longitudinal seats.

1988 schedule

The first railbus trip left at 7:30 a.m. on May 7 for Elk Park. There were 12:30 p.m. and 6:00 p.m. trips to Cascade Canyon. The season for the Animas River Railway was supposed to last from May 7 through October 30, but lasted until September 4 due to mechanical problems.

1989 schedule

The railbus was repaired and began operations on May 6, 1989. A 12:01 p.m. trip for Cascade Canyon ran until October 29. From May 27 through September 15 Elk Park trips ran at 7:30 a.m. and 3:30 p.m.

1990 schedule

The schedule for the Animas River Railway remained the same. The last excursion of the Animas River Railway was on September 23 from Rockwood to Cascade. Patronage never met expectations and has not operated since.

2002 schedule

During the 2002 Missionary Ridge Fire, the D&SNG voluntarily shut down steam service. To help continue service, motorcar 1001 now RB-1 and trailer 1002 now 313 took people out to Elk Park from Silverton.

== In popular media ==
The train is the subject of the song The Silverton, by C. W. McCall.

=== D&RGW ===
- 1950, A Ticket to Tomahawk. An early western Technicolor film in which the scenery and machinery were complemented by a brief bit-player appearance by Marilyn Monroe. The film is out of print as of August 2006, but can be found as a torrent for download.
- 1952, Denver and Rio Grande starring Sterling Hayden
- 1954, Siege at Red River starring Van Johnson
- 1955, Run for Cover starring James Cagney. Train scenes shot at the "High Line" above the Animas River Gorge.
- 1956, Around the World in 80 Days. The cast included Andy Devine, Marlene Dietrich, Buster Keaton, Shirley MacLaine, George Raft, Cesar Romero, Frank Sinatra, and Red Skelton
- 1957, Night Passage starring James Stewart. Especially interesting is the train traversing the "High Line" above the Animas River Gorge.
- 1965, The Sons of Katie Elder starring John Wayne and Dean Martin. Opening scenes of the film show D&RGW traveling along the Animas River.
- 1966, Gunpoint starring Audie Murphy, Denver Pyle, and Joan Staley. Scenes shot on Highline, upper Animas River canyon, and just south of Rockwood near Shalona Lake.
- 1969, Butch Cassidy and the Sundance Kid starring Paul Newman, Robert Redford, and Katharine Ross. Famous "cliff jump" scene shot near Baker's Bridge on Animas River in upper Hermosa Valley.
- 1971, Support Your Local Gunfighter starring James Garner, Suzanne Pleshette, and Harry Morgan

=== D&SNG ===
- 1988, The Tracker, a made-for-television film starring Kris Kristofferson and distributed by HBO Films
- 1991, the railroad's own track was featured in a Lexus LS400 commercial.
- 2006, The Prestige starring Christian Bale. The train shown in the beginning of the film is the D&SNG.
- 2022, "Long Haul" music video by musician Anthony D'Amato

== See also ==
- List of Colorado historic railroads
- List of heritage railroads in the United States
- Colorado Railroad Museum
- Cumbres and Toltec Scenic Railroad
- White Pass and Yukon Route
- Great Smoky Mountains Railroad
- Texas State Railroad
