= Rio Grande 168 =

Preserved D&RGW class T-12 locomotive

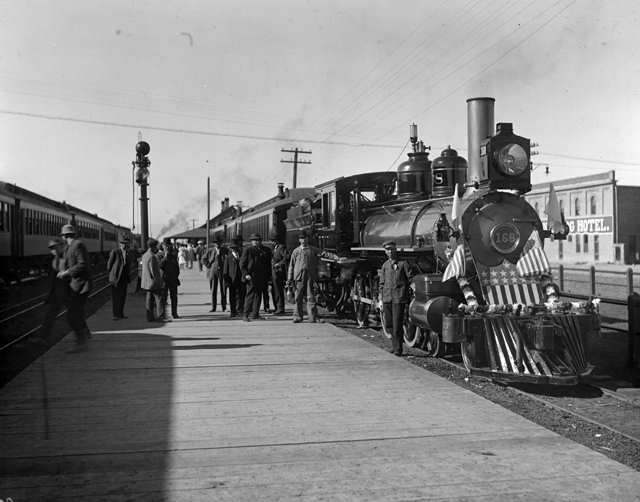
- No. 168 at the head of a special train taking William Howard Taft to the opening of the Gunnison Tunnel in 1909
Type and origin
- Power type: Steam
- Builder: Baldwin Locomotive Works
- Serial number: 6670
- Build date: 1883
Specifications
- Configuration
  - Whyte: 4-6-0
  - UIC: 2′C n2
- Gauge: 3 ft (914 mm)
- Driver dia.: 46 in (1,168 mm)
- Length: 53.3 ft (16.2 m)
- Adhesive weight: 50,643 lb (23.0 t)
- Loco weight: 70,550 lb (32.0 t)
- Total weight: 117,950 lb (54 t)
- Fuel type: Coal
- Boiler pressure: 160 psi (1 MPa)
- Cylinders: Two, outside
- Cylinder size: 14 in × 20 in (356 mm × 508 mm)
- Valve gear: Stephenson
- Valve type: Piston valves
- Loco brake: Steam
- Train brakes: Steam
- Couplers: Knuckle
Performance figures
- Tractive effort: 11,590 lbf (51.55 kN)
Career
- Operators: Denver and Rio Grande Railroad; Denver and Rio Grande Western Railroad; Cumbres and Toltec Scenic Railroad
- Class: D&RG: 47; DRGW: T-12
- Numbers: D&RG 168; D&RGW 168
- Retired: 1938
- Restored: October 2019
- Current owner: The City of Colorado Springs, Colorado; Cumbres and Toltec Scenic Railroad (operator)
- Disposition: Operational
- Rio Grande Engine No. 168
- U.S. National Register of Historic Places
- Location within Colorado Location within the United States
- Location: 9 S. Sierra Madre, Colorado Springs, Colorado
- Coordinates: 38°50′3.4″N 104°49′41″W
- Area: less than one acre
- Built: 1883
- Architect: Baldwin Locomotive Works
- NRHP reference No.: 79000601
- Added to NRHP: August 10, 1979

Denver and Rio Grande Western 168 is a T-12 class 4-6-0 "Ten-Wheeler" type narrow-gauge steam locomotive. It is one of twelve similar locomotives built for the Denver and Rio Grande Railroad (D&RG) by the Baldwin Locomotive Works (BLW) in 1883. It was built as a passenger locomotive, with 46 in (1,168 mm) drivers, the largest drivers used on any three-foot gauge D&RGW locomotive. The large drivers made it suitable for relatively fast passenger service. Originally D&RG class 47, the designation T-12 followed the D&RGW class-naming format from 1924 of a letter, “T” for Ten-Wheeler type, and a number “12” for its rated tractive effort of approximately 12,000 pounds.

Various photographs show 168 during its working life. One shows it in the Black Canyon of the Gunnison River in 1904. Another shows it in Montrose, Colorado, west of Gunnison, at the head of a special train taking President William Howard Taft to the opening of the Gunnison Tunnel which, at the time, was the longest irrigation tunnel in the world. There are also photographs, taken by Otto Perry, showing it in Alamosa in 1923 and Salida in 1929. It was retired in 1938 after a service life of 55 years.

The railroad gave it to the City of Colorado Springs on August 1, 1938. It was added to the National Register of Historic Places as Rio Grande Engine No. 168 in 1979. Although it sat in Antlers Park, unprotected from the elements behind a low fence for so many years, it appeared to be in remarkable cosmetic condition when removed for restoration to operating condition in early 2016.

The city has arranged with the Cumbres and Toltec Scenic Railroad (C&TSRR) to have the engine restored to working order. The locomotive is now located in Antonito, Colorado.

Restoration was completed in October 2019. The restoration project was headed up by Cumbres and Toltec Special Projects department and led by Assistant General Manager Efstathios Papas. The project cost $508,000 and took 27 months to complete. The railroad intends to use this engine frequently and put it into normal service as much as possible.

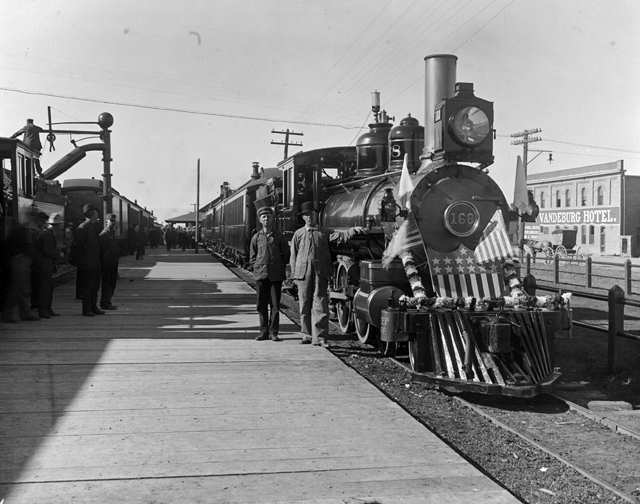

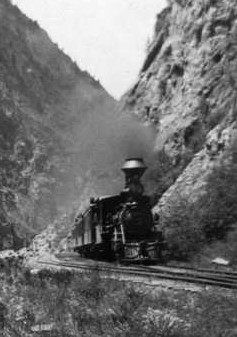
D&RG 168 in the Black Canyon of the Gunnison, 1904

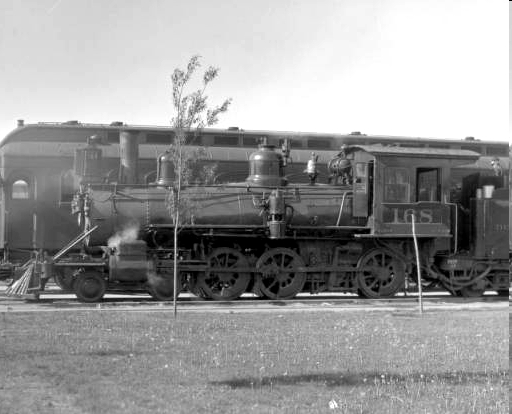
Alamosa, 1923

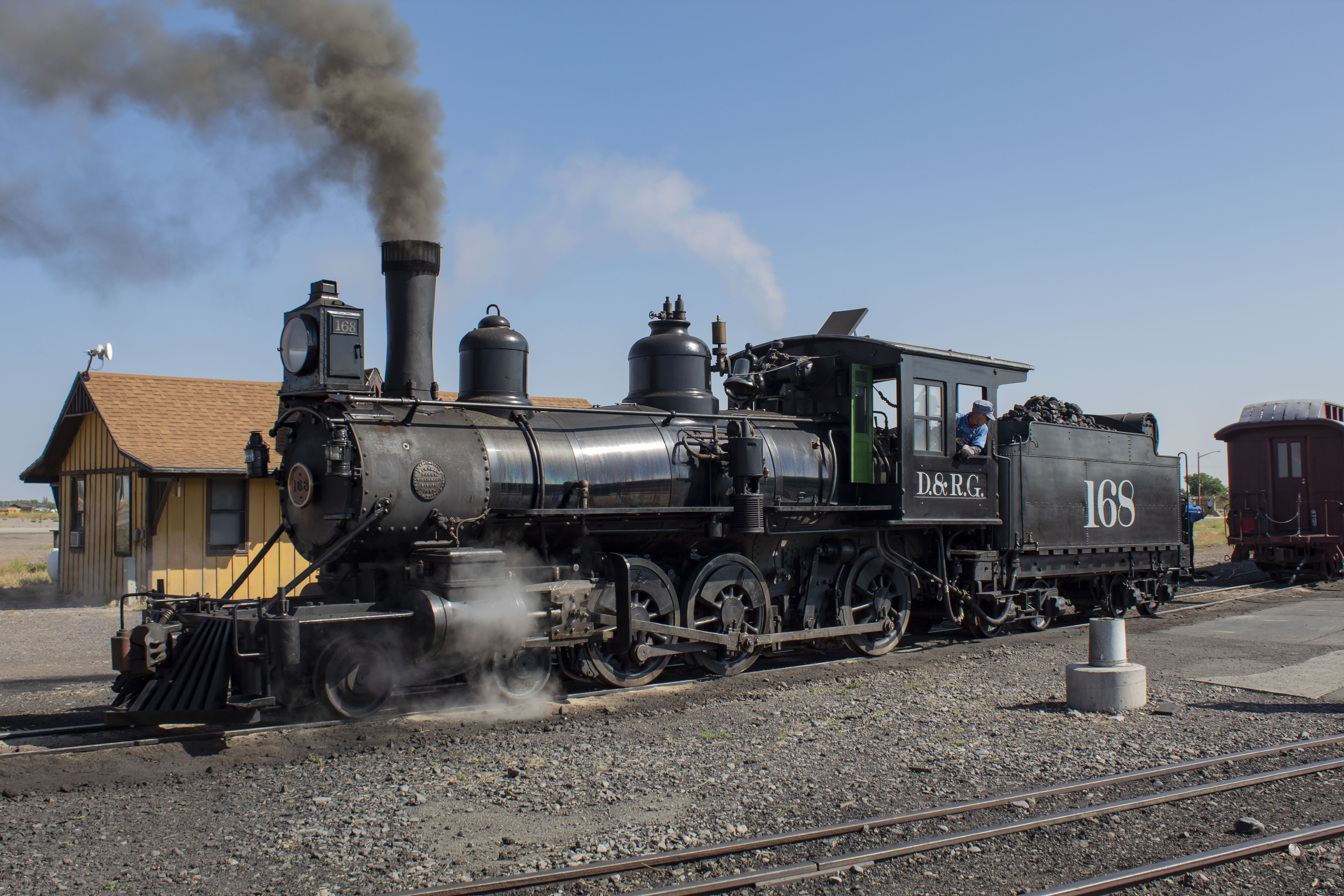
After restoration as seen in 2021 at Antonito

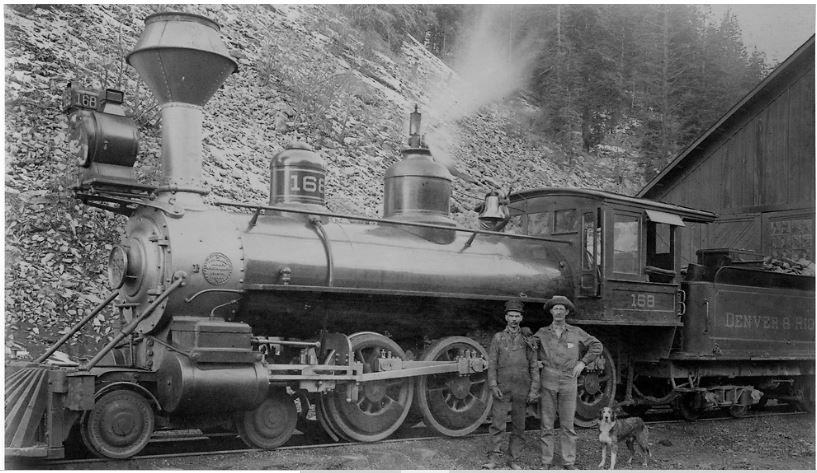
D&RG 168 at the Ouray, Colorado engine house, showing what it looked like in its early years with a diamond stack and wooden pilot (cowcatcher). (Friends of the Cumbres & Toltec Scenic RR collection)

== See also ==
- National Register of Historic Places listings in El Paso County, Colorado
- Rio Grande 169
- Rio Grande 223
- Rio Grande 268
- Rio Grande 278
- Rio Grande 315
- Rio Grande 463
