= Rio Grande 169 =

Preserved 4-6-0 steam locomotive

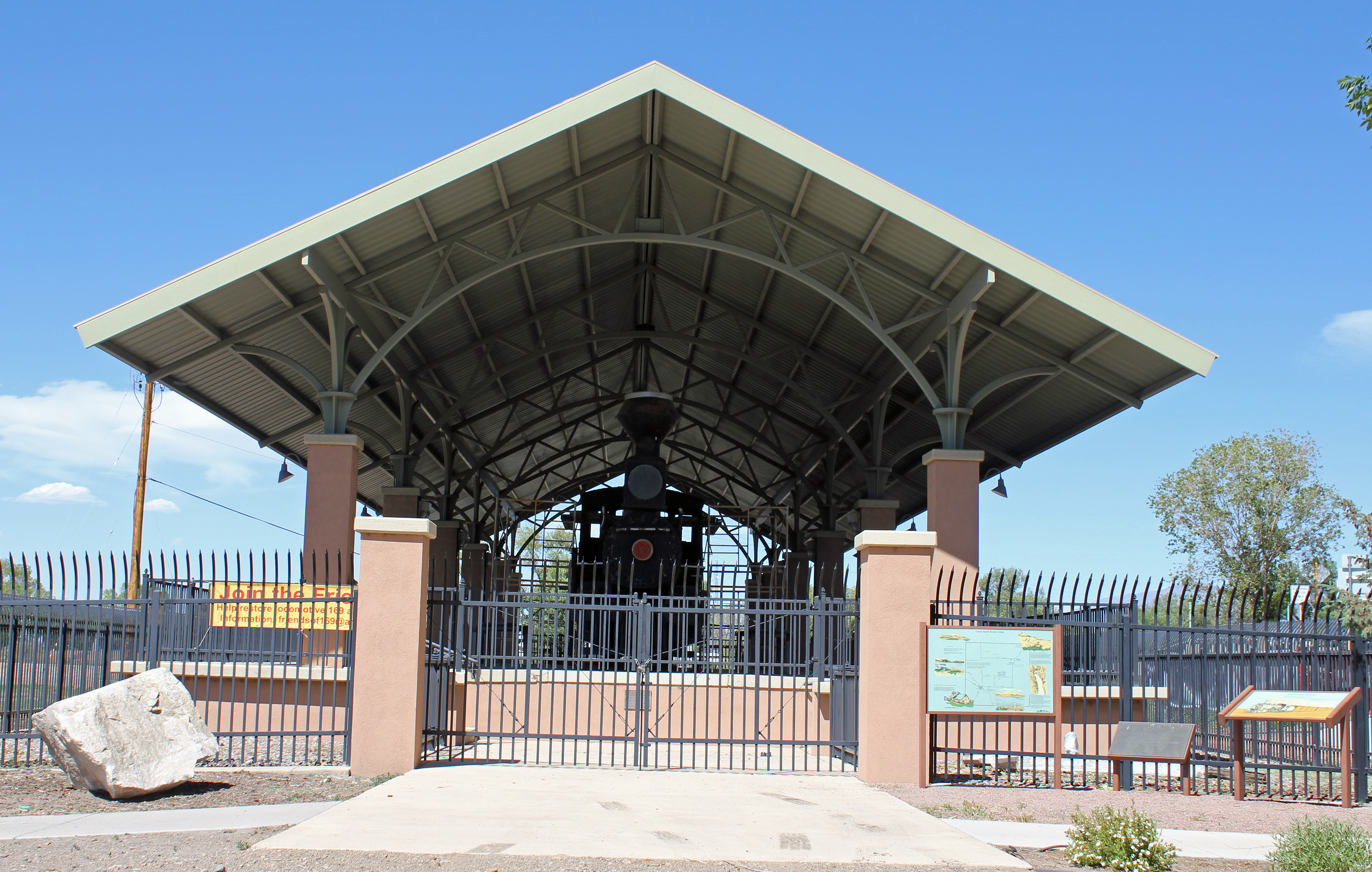
- Cole Park in Alamosa, Colorado.
Type and origin
- Power type: Steam
- Builder: Baldwin Locomotive Works
- Serial number: 7028
- Build date: 1883
Specifications
- Configuration
  - Whyte: 4-6-0
  - UIC: 2′C n2
- Gauge: 3 ft (914 mm)
- Driver dia.: 46 in (1,168 mm)
- Adhesive weight: 50,643 lb (23.0 t)
- Loco weight: 70,550 lb (32.0 t)
- Fuel type: Coal
- Cylinders: Two, outside
- Cylinder size: 14 in × 20 in (356 mm × 508 mm)
- Valve gear: Walschaerts
- Valve type: Piston valves
- Loco brake: Air
- Train brakes: Air
- Couplers: Knuckle
Performance figures
- Tractive effort: c. 12,000 lbf (53.38 kN)
Career
- Operators: Denver and Rio Grande Railroad; Denver and Rio Grande Western Railroad
- Class: D&RG: 47, DRGW: T-12
- Numbers: D&RGW 169
- Last run: 1938
- Retired: 1941
- Current owner: The City of Alamosa
- Disposition: On static display
- Denver and Rio Grande Railroad Locomotive No.169
- U.S. National Register of Historic Places
- Colorado State Register of Historic Properties
- Location within Colorado Location within the United States
- Location: Along Chamber Dr. within Cole Park, Alamosa, Colorado
- Coordinates: 37°28′10.6″N 105°51′43.1″W
- Area: less than one acre
- Built: 1883
- Architect: Baldwin Locomotive Works
- Architectural style: Narrow gauge steam locomotive
- NRHP reference No.: 01000230
- CSRHP No.: 5AL.312.1
- Added to NRHP: March 12, 2001

Denver and Rio Grande Western 169 is a 4-6-0 "Ten Wheeler" type narrow gauge steam locomotive. It is one of twelve similar locomotives built for the Denver and Rio Grande Railroad (D&RGW) by Baldwin Locomotive Works in 1883. It was built as a passenger locomotive, with 46 in (1,200 mm) drivers. Originally D&RG class 47, the designation T-12 followed the D&RGW class-naming format from 1924 of a letter, “T” for Ten-Wheeler type, and a number “12” for its rated tractive effort of approximately 12,000 pounds.

During its operational life it was used on all major narrow gauge D&RGW lines. It appears in two Otto Perry photographs on the branch to Santa Fe, New Mexico in April 1933. It was taken out of service in 1938 and then refurbished in 1939 to appear at the 1939 New York World's Fair. In 1941, the railroad donated it to Alamosa, Colorado and has been on display in Cole Park there since. It was added to the National Register of Historic Places as Denver and Rio Grande Railroad Locomotive No.169 in 2001.

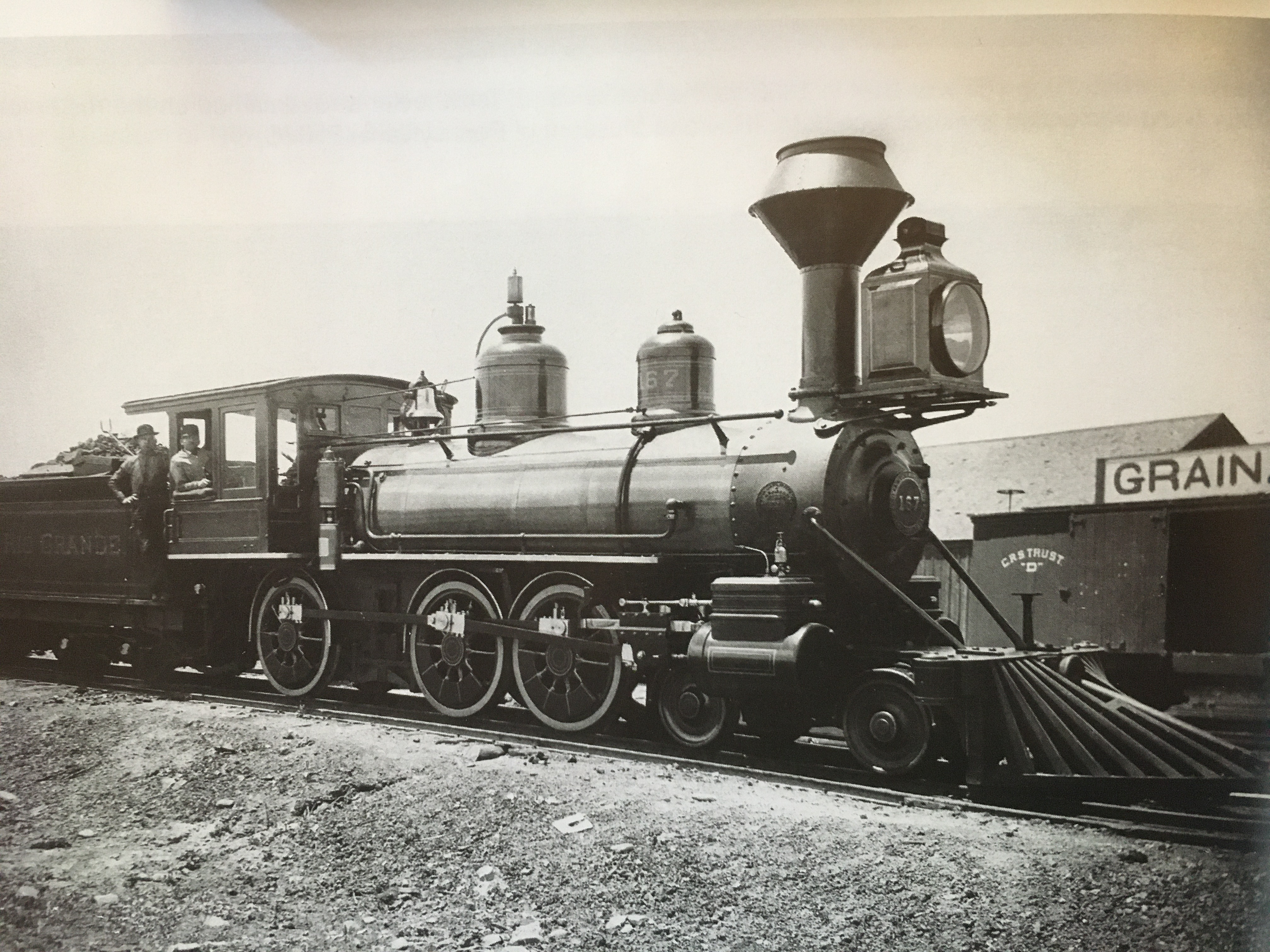
Denver & Rio Grande #167, at Alamosa, Colorado, not long after the railroad received it from Baldwin Locomotive Works in 1883. This engine was a sister to D&RG 169. The photo shows what #169 looked like originally, with diamond stack, box headlight and a wooden pilot (cowcatcher). (Colorado RR Museum collection)

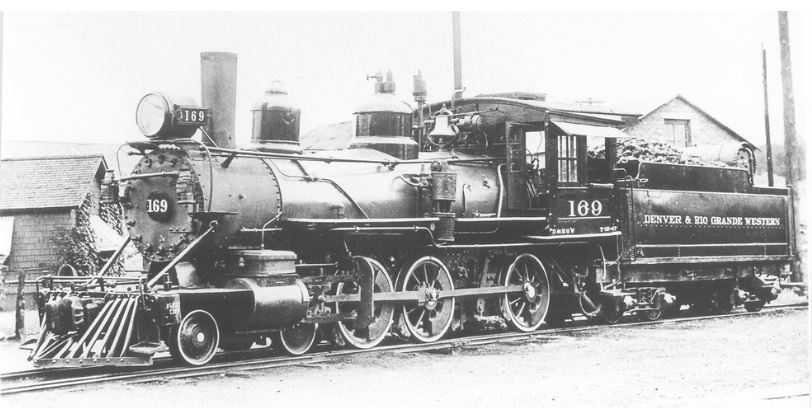
D&RG 169 in the 20th century (after various modifications, such as the stack, headlight, pilot, etc.).

== See also ==
- Rio Grande 168
- Rio Grande 223
- Rio Grande 278
- Rio Grande 315
- Rio Grande 463
