= Denver and Rio Grande Western Railroad =

American railroad company

Denver & Rio Grande Western Railroad

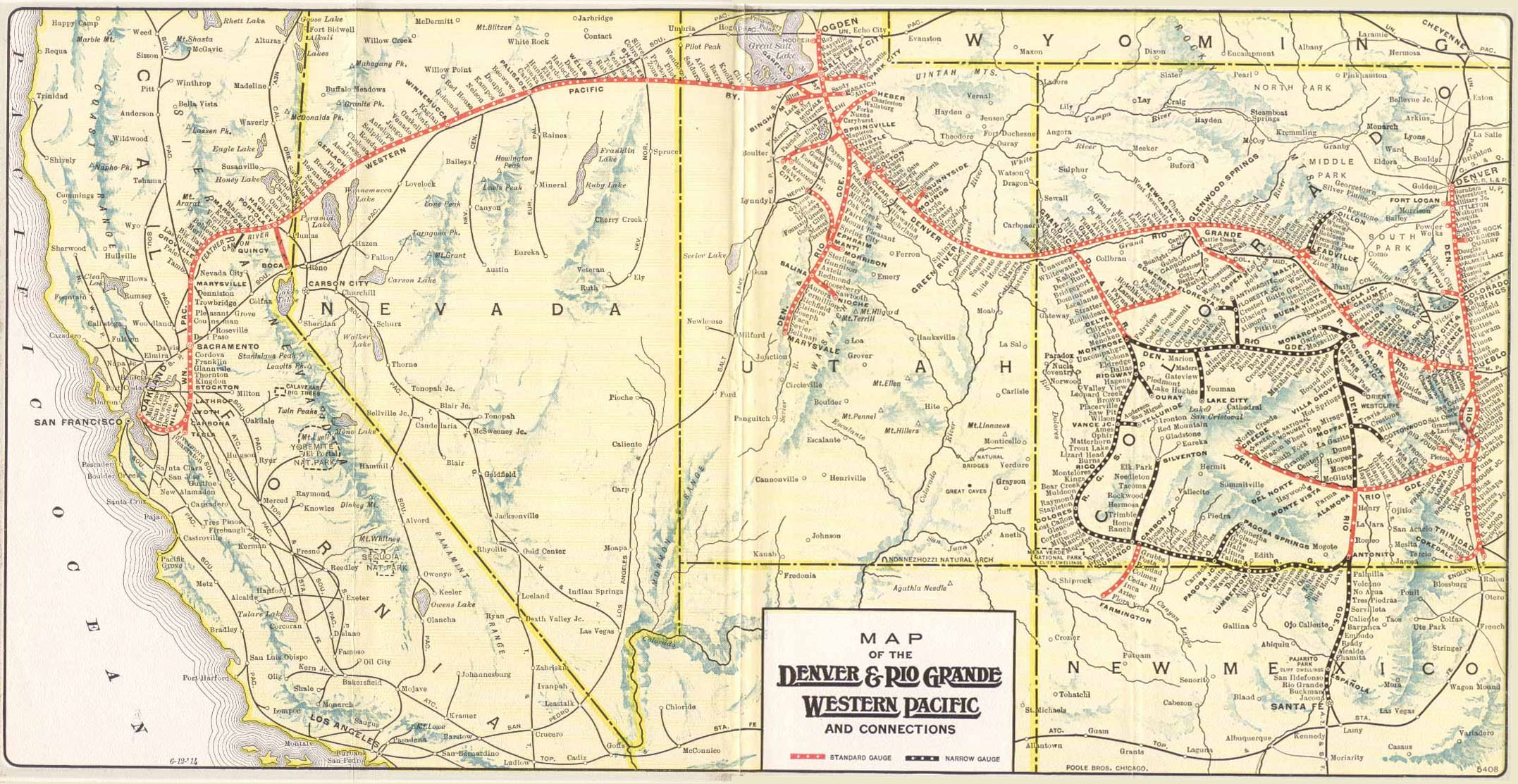
- Map of D&RGW and WP routes (c. 1914).

Overview
- Headquarters: Denver, Colorado
- Reporting mark: DRGW
- Locale: Colorado, Utah, and New Mexico
- Dates of operation: 1870–1992
- Successor: Southern Pacific Railroad; Union Pacific Railroad; Durango and Silverton Narrow Gauge Railroad

Technical
- Track gauge: 4 ft 8 1/2 in (1,435 mm) standard gauge
- Previous gauge: 3 ft (914 mm)
- Length: 2,247 miles (3,616 km)

The Denver and Rio Grande Western Railroad (reporting mark DRGW), often shortened to Rio Grande, D&RG or D&RGW, formerly the Denver & Rio Grande Railroad, was an American Class I railroad company. The railroad started as a 3 ft (914 mm) narrow-gauge line running south from Denver, Colorado, in 1870. It served mainly as a transcontinental bridge line between Denver and Ogden, Utah. The Rio Grande was also a major origin of coal and mineral traffic.

The Rio Grande was a strong example of mountain railroading, with a motto of Through the Rockies, not around them and later Main line through the Rockies, both referring to the Rocky Mountains.

The D&RGW operated the highest mainline rail line in the United States, over the 10,240 feet (3,120 m) Tennessee Pass in Colorado, and the famed routes through the Moffat Tunnel and the Royal Gorge. At its height, in 1889, the D&RGW had the largest narrow-gauge railroad network in North America with 1,861 miles (2,995 km) of track interconnecting the states of Colorado, New Mexico, and Utah. Known for its independence, the D&RGW operated the Rio Grande Zephyr until its discontinuation in 1983. This was the last private intercity passenger train in the United States until Brightline began service in Florida in 2018.

In 1988, the Rio Grande's parent corporation, Rio Grande Industries, purchased Southern Pacific Transportation Company, and as the result of a merger, the larger Southern Pacific Railroad name was chosen for identity. The Rio Grande operated as a separate division of the Southern Pacific until 1992. Today, most former D&RGW main lines are owned and operated by the Union Pacific Railroad while several branch lines are now operated as heritage railways by various companies.

== History ==
=== Overview ===
The Denver & Rio Grande Railway (D&RG) was incorporated on October 27, 1870, by General William Jackson Palmer (1836–1909), and a board of four directors. It was originally announced that the new 3 ft (914 mm) railroad would proceed south from Denver and travel an estimated 875 miles (1,408 km) south to El Paso via Pueblo, westward along the Arkansas River, and continue southward through the San Luis Valley of Colorado toward the Rio Grande. Closely assisted by his friend and new business partner Dr. William Bell, Palmer's new "Baby Road" laid the first rails out of Denver on July 28, 1871, and reached the location of the new town of Colorado Springs (then the Fountain Colony) by October 21. Narrow gauge was chosen in part because construction and equipment costs would be relatively more affordable when weighed against that of the prevailing standard gauge. Palmer's first hand impressions of the Ffestiniog Railway in Wales buoyed his interest in the narrow-gauge concept which would prove to be advantageous while conquering the mountainous regions of the Southwest. Eventually the route of the D&RG would be amended (including a plan to continue south from Pueblo over Raton Pass) and added to as new opportunities and competition challenged the railroad's expanding goals.

Feverish, competitive construction plans provoked the 1877–1880 war over right of way with the Atchison, Topeka and Santa Fe Railway. Both rivals hired gunslingers and bought politicians while courts intervened to bring settlement to the disagreements. One anecdote of the conflict recounts June, 1879, when the Santa Fe defended its roundhouse in Pueblo with Dodge City toughs led by Bat Masterson; on that occasion, D&RG treasurer R. F. Weitbrec paid the defenders to leave. In March, 1880, a Boston Court granted the AT&SF the rights to Raton Pass, while the D&RG paid an exorbitant $1.4 million for the trackage extending through the Arkansas River's Royal Gorge. The D&RG's possession of this route allowed quick access to the booming mining district of Leadville, Colorado. While this "Treaty of Boston" did not exactly favor the purest of original D&RG intentions, the conquering of new mining settlements to the west and the future opportunity to expand into Utah was realized from this settlement.

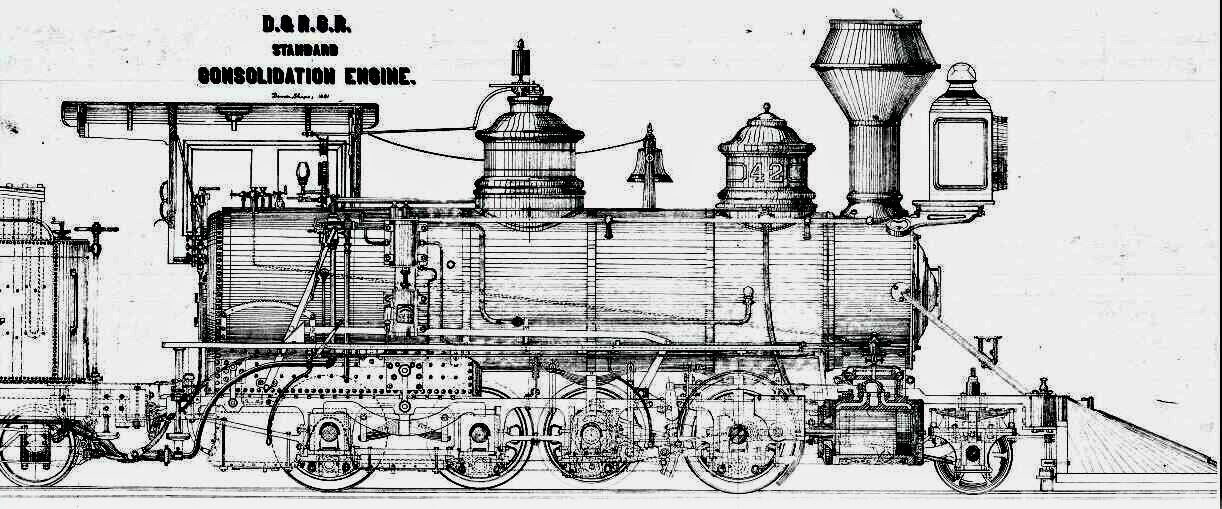
During the late 1800s the D&RG made extensive use of consolidations (engines with a 2-8-0 wheel arrangement). This drawing, of an unusual wheel arrangement, was titled "Standard Consolidation Engine", 1881.

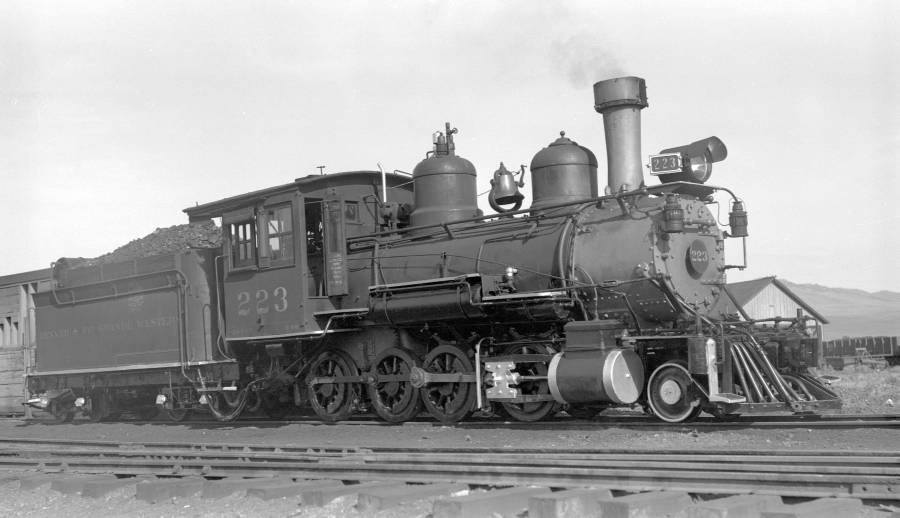
Over the course of decades, D&RG consolidations were subjected to various modifications. In the 20th century, diamond stacks gave way to straight stacks, box headlights were replaced with round ones, decorative trim disappeared from the domes, and wooden pilots (cowcatchers) were replaced with steel ones.

By late 1880, William Bell had begun to organize railway construction in Utah that would become the Palmer controlled Denver & Rio Grande Western Railway in mid-1881. The intention of the D&RGW (aka the "Western") was to work eastward from Provo to an eventual link with westward bound D&RG in Colorado. This physical connection was realized near the Green River on March 30, 1883, and by May of that year the D&RG formally leased its Utah subsidiary as previously planned. By mid-1883, financial difficulties due to aggressive growth and expenditures led to a shake up among the D&RG board of directors, and General Palmer resigned as president of the D&RG in August, 1883, while retaining that position with the Western. Frederick Lovejoy would soon fill Palmer's vacated seat on the D&RG, the first in a succession of post Palmer presidents that would attempt to direct the railroad through future struggles and successes.

Following bitter conflict with the Rio Grande Western during lease disagreements and continued financial struggles, the D&RG went into receivership in July, 1884, with court-appointed receiver William S. Jackson in control. Eventual foreclosure and sale of the original Denver & Rio Grande Railway resulted within two years, and the new Denver & Rio Grande Railroad took formal control of the property and holdings on July 14, 1886, with Jackson appointed as president. General Palmer would continue as president of the Utah line until retirement (due to company re-organization) in 1901.

Throughout the railroad's history its primary heavy repair shops were located south of Denver, Colorado, in Burnham. They were built in 1871 and equipped to service both narrow gauge and standard gauge rolling stock. In 1922 the site received $3 million in upgrades, expanding the capacity to repair locomotives and cars. The last steam locomotive was serviced in 1956, at which time the locomotive department was converted to service diesel engines. The other major back shop site was in Salt Lake City, Utah, built in 1883. The shops in Alamosa, Colorado, primarily serviced narrow gauge rolling stock.

=== Royal Gorge Route ===
The D&RG built west from Pueblo reaching Cañon City in 1874. The line through the Royal Gorge reached Salida on May 20, 1880, and was pushed to Leadville later that same year. From Salida, the D&RG pushed west over the Continental Divide at the 10,845 feet (3,306 m) Marshall Pass and reached Gunnison on August 6, 1881. From Gunnison the line entered the Black Canyon of the Gunnison River passing the famous Curecanti Needle seen in their famous Scenic Line of the World Herald. The tracks left the increasingly-difficult canyon at Cimmaron and passed over Cerro Summit, reaching Montrose on September 8, 1882. From Montrose, a line was laid north through Delta, reaching Grand Junction in March, 1883. The line continued building west until reaching the D&RGW close to present day Green River which completed a narrow-gauge transcontinental link with the Rio Grande Western Railway to Salt Lake City, Utah.

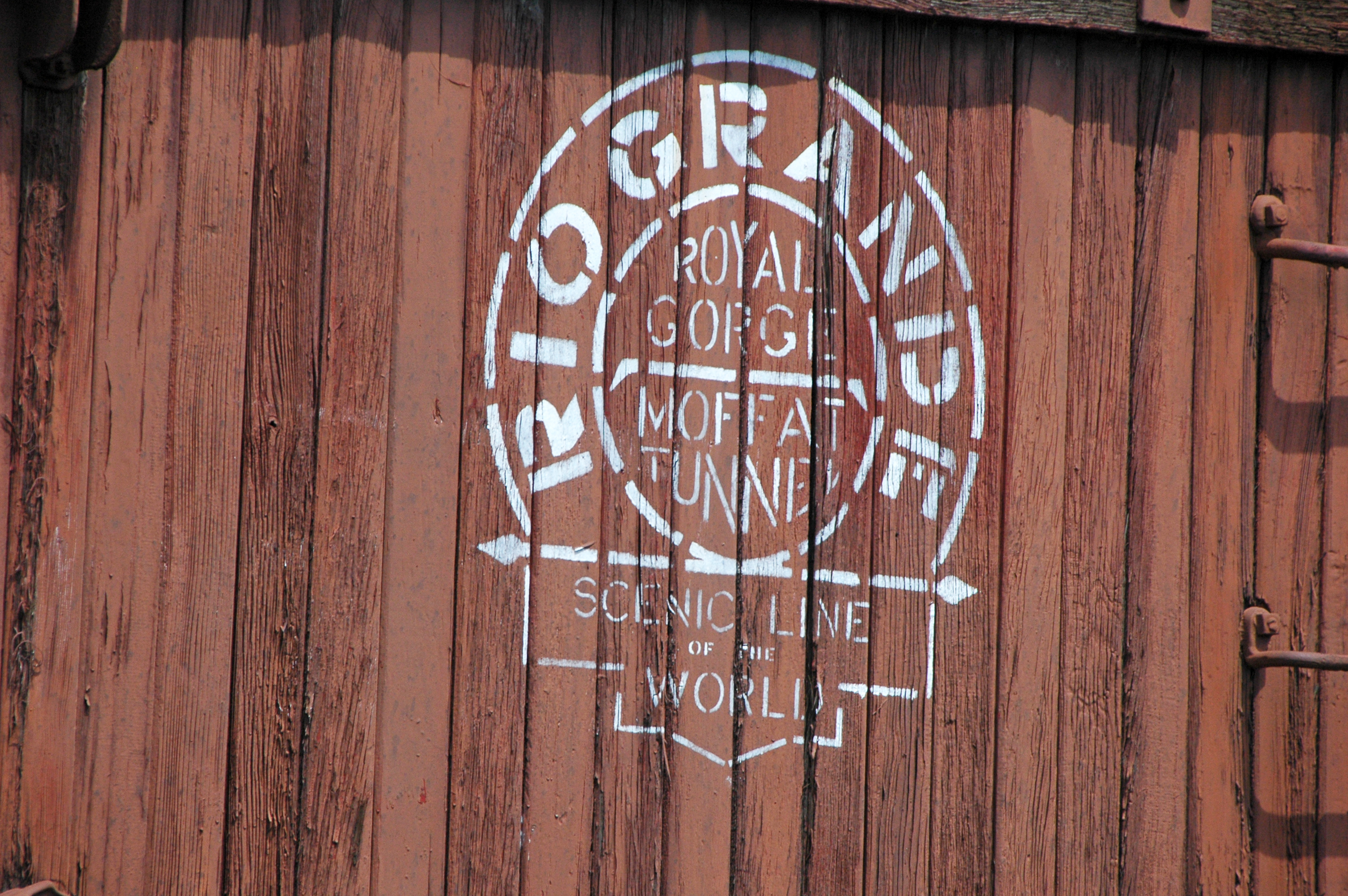
The D&RG touted its scenic Royal Gorge Route in the company herald on rolling stock beginning in 1926.

The line from Pueblo to Leadville was upgraded in 1887 to three rails to accommodate both narrow-gauge and standard-gauge operation. Narrow-gauge branch lines were constructed to Chama, New Mexico, Durango, Silverton, Crested Butte, Lake City, Ouray and Somerset, Colorado.

The D&RG round herald featuring the words "Royal Gorge Route" was applied to rolling stock beginning in 1926 (A similar herald had been used on company stationery earlier). In 1936, the words "Moffat Tunnel" were added, and in 1939, it was replaced by the "Flying Rio Grande" logo.

The route over Tennessee Pass had steep grades, and it was not uncommon to see trains running with midtrain and rear-end helpers. In 1997, a year after the D&RGW/SP merger with Union Pacific, the UP closed the line. Although it has been out of service for more than two decades, the rails are still in usable condition, though many of the signals have been ravaged by time and vandals. In 2011, under a federal Beautification Grant, a private contractor removed and scrapped the railroad's overhead signal pole lines.

=== San Juan Extension ===
The D&RG also pushed west from Walsenburg, Colorado, over La Veta Pass (now "Old La Veta Pass") by 1877. At the time the 'Uptop' depot on Veta Pass, rising over 9,500 feet (2,900 m) in elevation, boasted the highest elevation for a narrow-gauge railroad. The railroad reached Alamosa by 1878. From Alamosa, a line was pushed south through Antonito eventually reaching Santa Fe, New Mexico (the Chili Line), and west as far as Creede, Colorado. A line containing one of the longest narrow-gauge tangent tracks in U.S. railroading (52.82 miles or 85 kilometers) also linked Alamosa with Salida to the north. From Antonito a line was built over 10,015 feet (3,053 m) Cumbres Pass, along the Colorado-New Mexico border, reaching Durango, Colorado, in August, 1881 and continuing north to the rich mining areas around Silverton in July, 1882. A line was also constructed in 1902 as a standard-gauge line, perhaps in anticipation of possible standard gauging of the entire line, south from Durango to Farmington, New Mexico.

Part of the reason for this isolated change of gauge was that the Southern Pacific contemplated extending to access coal fields in the northern San Juan basin, had surveyors working there, and had incorporated a subsidiary, the Arizona & Colorado Railroad Company, for this purpose. As a defensive move, this may have been enough to discourage the A&C from proceeding to construction. Originally hauling mainly agricultural products, the Farmington line was converted to narrow gauge in 1923, and later delivered pipe and other construction materials to the local oil and natural gas industry into the 1960s.

Portions of the Alamosa–Durango line survive to this day. The Walsenburg–Alamosa–Antonito line survives as the standard-gauge Colorado Pacific Rio Grande Railroad, with passenger excursion trains service provided by the Rio Grande Scenic Railroad. Two narrow-gauge segments survive as steam railroads, the Antonito–Chama line as the Cumbres and Toltec Scenic Railroad and Durango–Silverton as the Durango and Silverton Narrow Gauge Railroad.

Rio Grande Southern Railroad connected to San Juan Extension in Durango and went through the western edge of San Juan Mountains to Ridgway, Colorado, on Montrose–Ouray branch.

=== Tennessee Pass ===
The D&RG built west from Leadville over 10,240 feet (3,120 m) Tennessee Pass in an attempt to reach the mining areas around Aspen, Colorado, before its rival railroad in the area, the Colorado Midland, could build a line reaching there. The D&RG built a line through Glenwood Canyon to Glenwood Springs, reaching Aspen in October, 1887. The D&RG then joined with the Colorado Midland to build a line from Glenwood Springs connecting with D&RG at Grand Junction. Originally considered a secondary branch route to Grand Junction, the entire route from Leadville to Grand Junction was upgraded to standard gauge in 1890, and the original narrow-gauge route via Marshall Pass became a secondary route.

==== Denver & Rio Grande Western ====
The first (1881–1889) Denver & Rio Grande Western Railway built a narrow-gauge line from Ogden, Utah, via Soldier Summit, Utah, to Grand Junction, Colorado. The railroad was reorganized as the Rio Grande Western Railway in 1889, as part of a finance plan to upgrade the line from narrow gauge to standard gauge, and built several branch lines in Utah to reach lucrative coal fields. It was the railway which Gustaf Nordenskiöld employed to haul boxcars of relics from the Mesa Verde, Colorado, cliff dwellings, in 1891, en route to the National Museum of Finland. In 1901, the Denver & Rio Grande merged with the Rio Grande Western, consolidating in 1908. However, the railroad was weakened by speculators, who had used the Rio Grande's equity to finance Western Pacific Railroad construction. The United States Railroad Administration (USRA) took over the D&RG during World War I. In 1918, the D&RG fell into receivership after the bankruptcy of Western Pacific. The Denver & Rio Grande Western Railroad (D&RGW or DRGW) was incorporated in 1920, and formally emerged as the new re-organization of the old Denver & Rio Grande Railroad on July 31, 1921.

=== Moffat Road ===
In 1931, the D&RGW acquired the Denver and Salt Lake Western Railroad, a paper railroad subsidiary of the Denver and Salt Lake Railroad (D&SL) which had acquired the rights to build a 40-mile (64 km) connection between the two railroads. After years of negotiation, the D&RGW gained trackage rights on the D&SL from Denver to the new cutoff. In 1932, the D&RGW began construction of the Dotsero Cutoff east of Glenwood Springs to near Bond on the Colorado River, at a location called Orestod (Dotsero spelled backward). Construction was completed in 1934, giving Denver a direct transcontinental link to the west. The D&RGW slipped into bankruptcy again in 1935. Emerging in 1947, it merged with the D&SL on March 3, 1947, gaining control of the "Moffat Road" through the Moffat Tunnel and a branch line from Bond to Craig, Colorado.

=== "Fast Freights" and the California Zephyr, 1950–1983 ===
Finally free from financial problems, the D&RGW now possessed a direct route from Denver to Salt Lake City (the detour south through Pueblo and Tennessee Pass was no longer required for direct service), but a problem still remained: for transcontinental service, the Union Pacific's more northerly line was far less mountainous (and, as a result, several hours faster). The D&RGW's solution was its "fast freight" philosophy, which employed multiple diesel locomotives pulling short, frequent trains. This philosophy helps to explain why the D&RGW, despite its proximity to one of the nation's most productive coal mining regions, retired coal-fueled steam locomotives as quickly as new, replacement diesels could be purchased. By 1956, the D&RGW's standard-gauge steam locomotives had been retired and scrapped. The reason for this was that unlike steam locomotives, diesel locomotives could easily be combined, using the diesels' multiple unit capabilities, to equip each train with the optimum horsepower which was needed to meet the D&RGW's aggressive schedule.

The D&RGW's sense of its unique geographical challenge found expression in the form of the California Zephyr, a passenger train which was jointly operated with the Chicago, Burlington and Quincy Railroad (CB&Q) from Chicago to Denver, the D&RGW from Denver to Salt Lake City, and the Western Pacific Railroad from Salt Lake City to Oakland, California (with ferry and bus connections to San Francisco). Unable to compete with the Union Pacific's faster, less mountainous route and 39 3/4-hour schedules, the California Zephyr offered a more leisurely journey – a "rail cruise" – with ample vistas of the Rockies. Although the California Zephyr ran at full capacity and turned a modest profit from its 1949 inception through the late 1950s, by the mid-1960s the train was profitable only during the late spring, summer, and fall. In 1970, Western Pacific, claiming multimillion-dollar losses, dropped out. However, the D&RGW refused to join the national Amtrak system, and continued to operate its share of the Zephyr equipment as the Rio Grande Zephyr between Denver and Salt Lake City. By 1983, however, citing continued losses in revenue, the D&RGW decided to get out of the passenger business altogether and join Amtrak. With this move, Amtrak rerouted the San Francisco Zephyr to the Moffat Road line and rebranded it as the current incarnation of the California Zephyr.

Even as the D&RGW exploited the best new standard-gauge technology to compete with other transcontinental carriers, the railroad continued to operate the surviving steam-powered narrow-gauge lines, including the famed narrow-gauge line between Durango and Silverton, Colorado. Most of the remaining narrow-gauge trackage was abandoned in the 1950s and 1960s. At the end of 1970, it operated 1,903 miles (3,063 km) of road on 3,227 miles (5,193 km) of track; that year it carried 7,733 ton-miles of revenue freight and 21 million passenger-miles.

Two of the most scenic routes survived in operation by the D&RGW until they were sold to tourist railroad operators. The Cumbres and Toltec Scenic Railroad assumed operation of the line between Antonito, Colorado, and Chama, New Mexico, in 1970. The last D&RGW narrow-gauge line, from Durango to Silverton, was sold in 1981 to the Durango and Silverton Narrow Gauge Railroad, exactly one hundred years after the line went into operation.

==== Consolidation with Southern Pacific ====
In 1988, Rio Grande Industries, the company that controlled the D&RGW under the direction of Philip Anschutz, purchased the Southern Pacific Transportation Company (SP). The D&RGW used Southern Pacific's name with SP due to its name recognition among shippers. In time, the D&RGW's fast freight philosophy gave way to SP's long-established practice of running long, slow trains. A contributing factor was the rising cost of diesel fuel, a trend that set in after the 1973 oil crisis, which gradually undermined the D&RGW's fuel-consuming "fast freight" philosophy. By the early 1990s, the combined Rio Grande/Southern Pacific system had lost much of the competitive advantage that made it attractive to transcontinental shippers, and became largely dependent on hauling the high-quality coal produced in the mine fields of Colorado and Utah.

D&RGW locomotives retained their reporting marks and colors after the consolidation with the Southern Pacific and would do so until the Union Pacific merger. The one noticeable change was to Southern Pacific's "Bloody Nose" paint scheme. The serif font on the sides of the locomotives was replaced by the Rio Grande's "speed lettering", which was used on all SP locomotives built or repainted after the merger.

=== Merger with Union Pacific ===
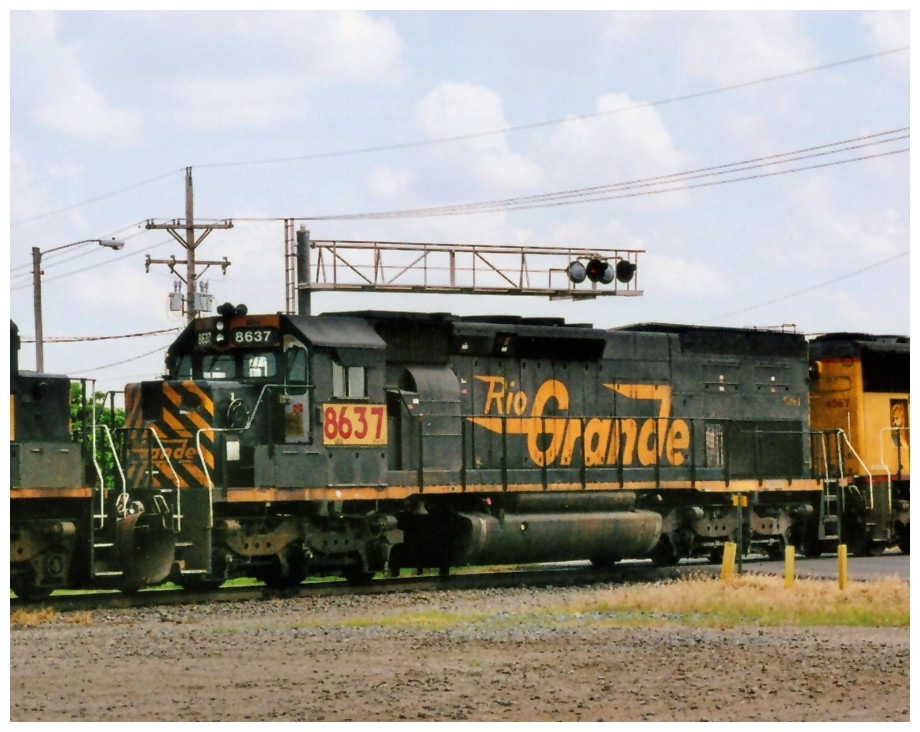
D&RGW 5384, patch-renumbered into UP 8637

On September 11, 1996, Anschutz sold the combined D&RGW/SP system with the parent company Southern Pacific Rail Corporation to the Union Pacific Corporation, partly in response to the earlier merger of Burlington Northern and Santa Fe which formed the Burlington Northern and Santa Fe Railway. As the Union Pacific absorbed the D&RGW into its system, signs of the fabled mountain railroad's existence slowly faded. D&RGW 5371, the only original D&RGW locomotive in full Rio Grande paint on the Union Pacific, was retired by UP in December 2008. D&RGW 5371 was donated to the Utah State Railroad Museum at Ogden's Union Station on August 17, 2009, and resides in the Eccles Rail Center at the south end of the building. Many other Rio Grande locomotives used to run in service with Union Pacific but have been "patch-renumbered", with a patch applied over the locomotive's number and the number boards replaced, but most, if not all, have been repainted into Union Pacifics Armour Yellow since.

In 2006, Union Pacific unveiled UP 1989, an EMD SD70ACe painted in a stylized version of the D&RGW color scheme. This unit is one of several SD70ACe locomotives in the Union Pacific heritage fleet has painted in stylized colors to help preserve the image of the railroads it has merged.

=== Presidents ===
The following people served as presidents (or the equivalent) of the D&RGW and its predecessors.

- William Jackson Palmer, 1870–1883
- Frederick Lovejoy, 1883–1884
- William S. Jackson, 1884–1887 (receiver, 1884–1886)
- David H. Moffat, 1887–1891
- Edward Turner Jeffery, 1891–1912
- Benjamin Franklin Bush, 1912–1915
- Henry U. Mudge, 1915–1917
- Edward L. Brown, 1917–1918
- Alexander R. Baldwin and Edward L. Brown, 1918–1921 (receivers)
- Joseph H. Young, 1921–1923 (receiver, 1922–1923)
- Thomas H. Beacom 1923–1924 (receiver)
- John S. Pyeatt, 1924–1935
- Wilson McCarthy and Henry Swan, 1935–1947 (trustees)
- Wilson McCarthy, 1947–1956
- Gale B. Aydelott ("Gus"), 1956–1977
- William J. Holtman, 1977–1992

== Rolling stock ==
By the beginning of 1948 the company owned 318 steam locomotives, 62 diesel locomotives, 179 passenger cars and 14,662 freight cars. In 1962, there were 22 steam locomotives, 257 diesel locomotives, 96 passenger cars and 12,386 freight cars.

== Passenger trains ==
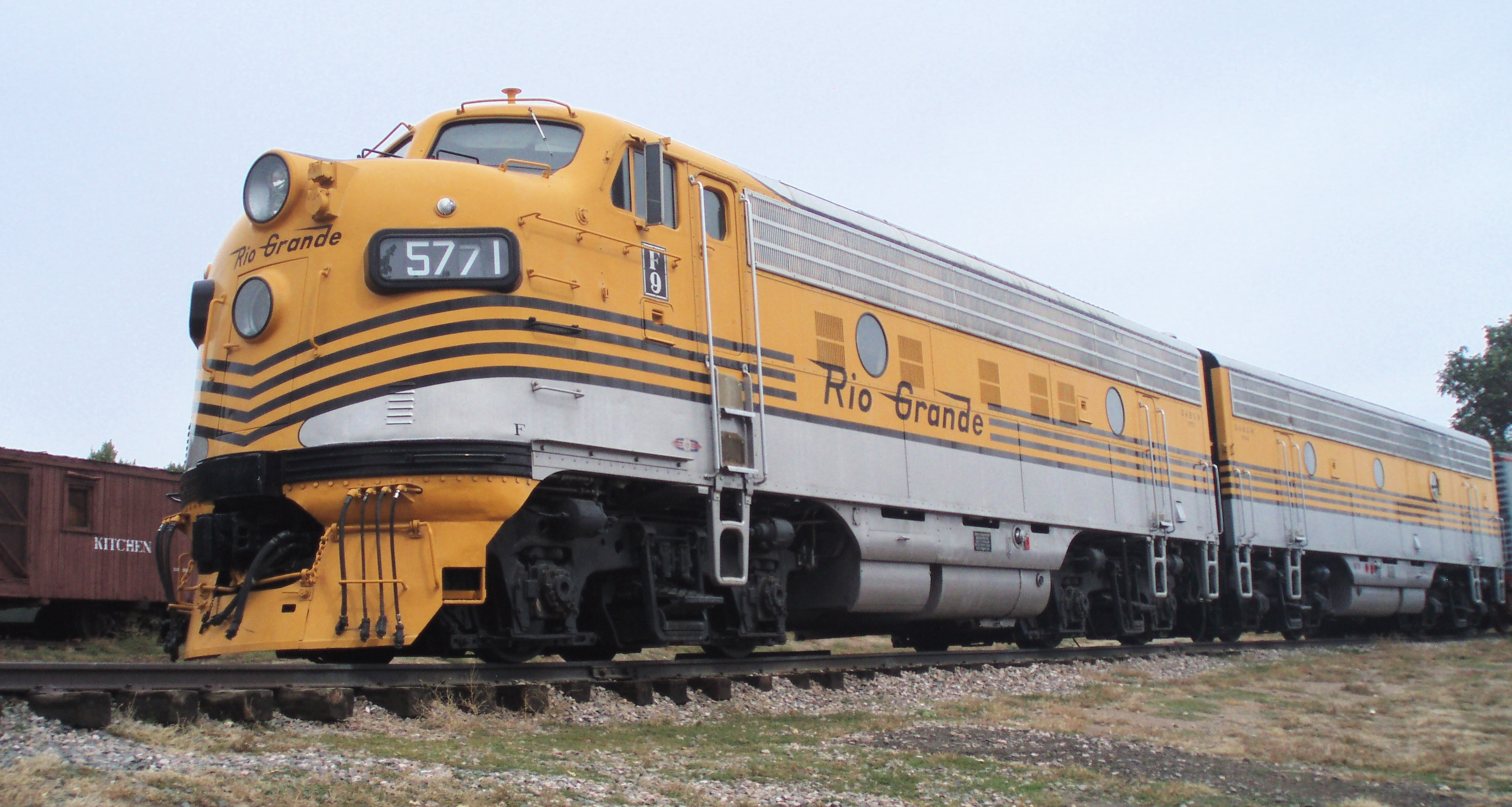
D&RGW passenger train at the Colorado Railroad Museum. The F9 A&B diesel electric locomotives (1955) were used for the California Zephyrs and Rio Grande Zephyrs.

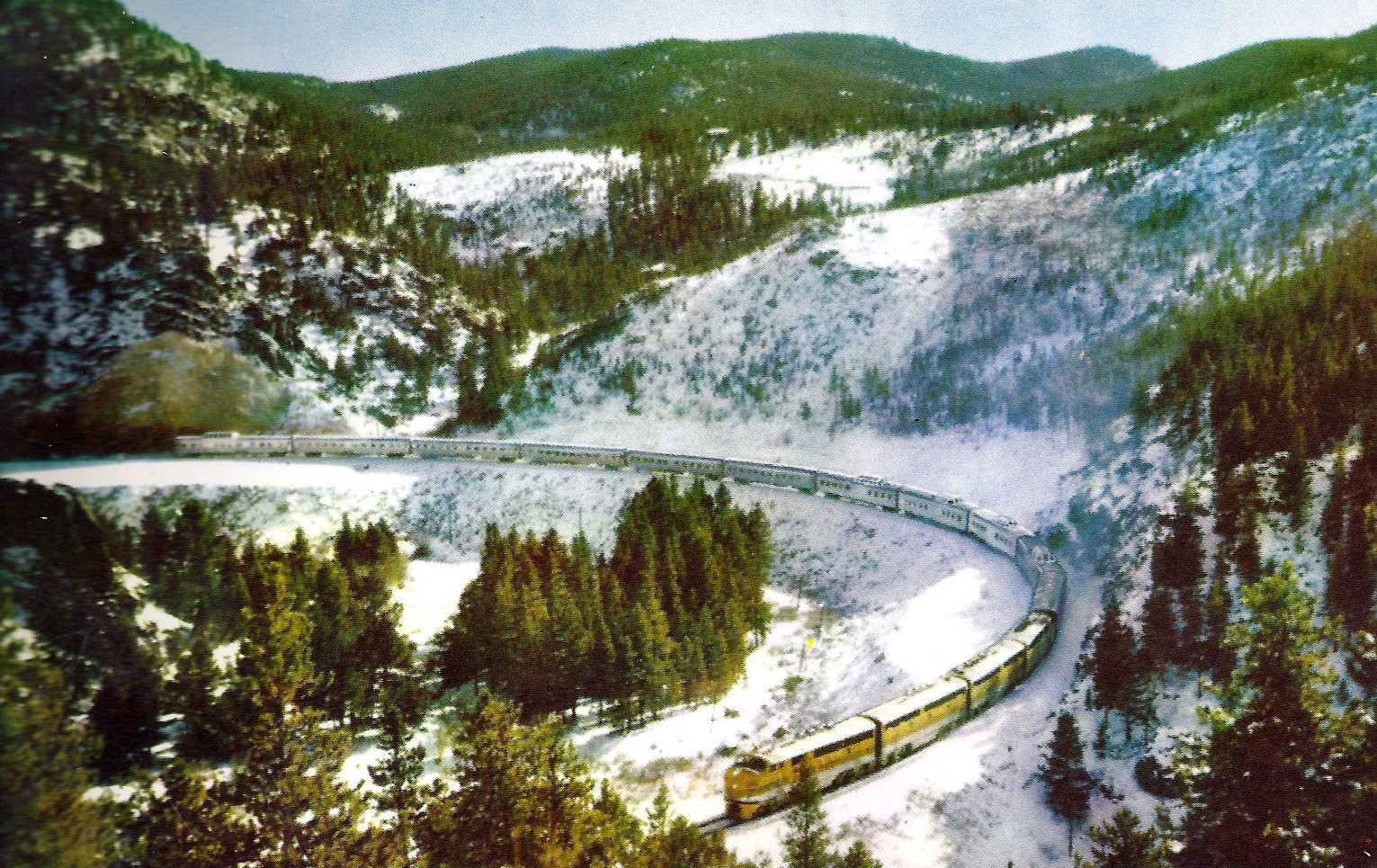
California Zephyr headed by D&RGW locomotives passes through the Colorado Rockies in winter.

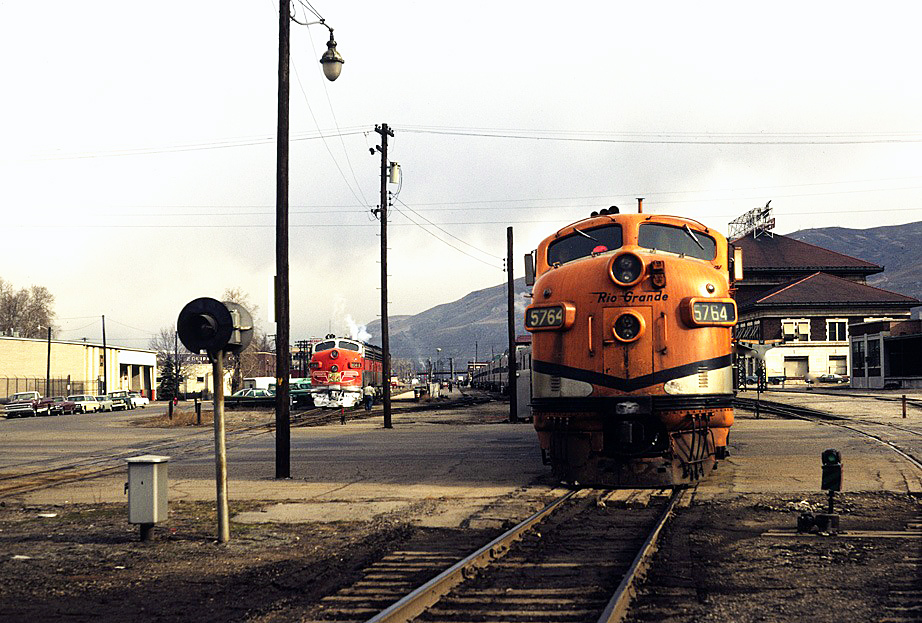
D&RGW locomotive on the next to last run of the California Zephyr, March 21, 1970, at Salt Lake City

This is a partial list of D&RGW passenger trains. Westbound trains had odd numbers, while eastbound trains had even numbers. Many of the trains were named and renamed as well as being re-numbered. There are over 180 names on a complete list of all the railroad's named trains.

Train numbers	Train name	Endpoints	Years of operation
1/2	Scenic Limited	Denver-Salt Lake City (via Royal Gorge)	1906–1946
1/2	Royal Gorge	Denver-Grand Junction (via Royal Gorge)	1946–1967
3/4	Colorado Eagle	St. Louis-Denver	1942–1966
5/6	The Exposition Flyer	Chicago-Oakland	1939–1949
7/8	Prospector	Denver-Salt Lake City/Ogden	1941–1942; 1945–1967
9/10	Yampa Valley Mail	Denver-Craig	1949–1963
9/10	Yampa Valley	Denver-Craig	1963–1968
17/18	California Zephyr	Chicago-Oakland	1949–1970; 1983–Present (operated by Amtrak)
17/18	Rio Grande Zephyr	Denver-Salt Lake City-Ogden	1970–1983
19/20	Mountaineer	Denver-Grand Junction-Montrose	1936–1959
115/116	San Juan Express (previously called the Colorado and New Mexico Express)	Alamosa-Durango	1937–1951
315/316	Shavano	Salida-Gunnison	1937–1940
461/462	The Silverton	Durango-Silverton	1947–1980 (summer only)
Special	Ski Train	Denver-Winter Park	1940–2009 (operated by ANSCO after 1988), 2016–present (operated by Amtrak as the Winter Park Express)
6/10	Cumbres And Toltec Scenic Railroad	Antonito-Chama	1970–present (operated by Cumbres and Toltec Railroad)

== Remnants ==
The Union Pacific acquired all D&RG owned assets at the time of the merger. The UP operates the former D&RGW main line as part of its Central Corridor. However, several branch lines and other assets have been sold, abandoned or re-purposed. These include several presently operating heritage railways that trace their origins to the Denver & Rio Grande Western.

=== Still-active and rebuilt features ===
Active rail assets tracing their heritage to the D&RGW that are not part of the Union Pacific network today include:

- California Zephyr – formerly operated by the D&RGW, is still active, but today operated by Amtrak.
  - The Amtrak depots used for the California Zephyr in the cities of Helper, Green River and Glenwood Springs are the original depots built by the D&RGW. The Amtrak depot in Grand Junction sits next to the abandoned D&RGW depot.
- FrontRunner – a commuter rail service in Utah. The portion between Salt Lake City and Provo is a parallel track built alongside the former D&RGW main.
- Red Line of the TRAX light rail system in Salt Lake City – The southern half of this line uses the rebuilt right of way of an abandoned D&RGW spur for the Bingham Canyon mine
- Rock and Rail LLC
- Colorado Pacific Rio Grande Railroad
- S Line – a streetcar line in Salt Lake City that uses the rebuilt right-of-way of D&RGW's former Sugar House branch.
- Winter Park Express operated by Amtrak, formerly the Ski Train
- Utah Central Railway

=== Heritage railways ===
- Cumbres and Toltec Scenic Railroad is a remnant of the narrow gauge San Juan Line (now isolated from the national rail network) that operates scenic trips over this route between Antonito, Colorado, and Chama, New Mexico.
- Durango and Silverton Narrow Gauge Railroad, which has been operating since 1881, provides scenic day trips from Durango to Silverton, along an isolated remnant of the San Juan line.
- Ghost Town & Calico Railroad operates two narrow-gauge steam engines built in 1881 (one of which came from the Denver & Rio Grande Railroad and the other from the Rio Grande Southern Railroad) with passenger cars, freight cars and a caboose from this time period, as well as a Galloping Goose at Knott's Berry Farm, which is a large amusement park in Buena Park, California.
- Heber Valley Historic Railroad provides scenic trips through the upper portion of Provo Canyon. The track was a branch of the D&RGW main at Provo, but is today isolated from the national rail network.
- Rio Grande Scenic Railroad is a heritage train on a still-active branch of the former D&RGW. However, it ceased operations in 2019.
- Royal Gorge Route Railroad operates over a 12-mile (19 km) portion of the intact, but otherwise disused Royal Gorge/Tennessee Pass line.

=== Re-purposed assets ===
- La Veta Pass Narrow Gauge Railroad Depot - A railroad depot on La Veta Pass used by the D&RGW until 1899.
- D & RGW Narrow Gauge Trestle - A trestle from the abandoned Marshall Pass line.
- The portion of the former D&RG main between Salt Lake City and Ogden, Utah, abandoned after the merger with the Union Pacific, is now a rail trail.
- Similarly, the portion of the Thistle–Marysvale branch through Marysvale Canyon is today a rail trail, which includes several tunnels.

=== Museums ===
The largest collection of surviving California Zephyr equipment can be found at the Western Pacific Railroad Museum at Portola, California, although this museum focuses on the Western Pacific Railroad, rather than the Rio Grande.

Museums that focus on the D&RGW include:

- Colorado Railroad Museum
- Western Mining and Railroad Museum in Helper, Utah
- Union Station (Ogden, Utah)

Museums using former D&RGW depots as buildings include:

- Denver and Rio Grande Depot (Montrose, Colorado)
- Denver and Rio Grande Western Depot (Salt Lake City)

== See also ==
- List of Denver and Rio Grande Western Railroad lines
- Narrow-gauge railroads in the United States
- Texas and St. Louis Railway
- Rio Grande 223
- Rio Grande 168
- Rio Grande 169
- Rio Grande 268
- Rio Grande 278
- Rio Grande 315
- Rio Grande 463

== Bibliography ==
- Athearn, Robert G. (January 1957). "Railroad Renaissance In The Rockies". Utah Historical Quarterly. XXXV (1): 1–26. doi:10.2307/45057880. JSTOR 45057880. S2CID 254438817. Archived from the original on September 27, 2023.
- Athearn, Robert G. (1962). Rebel of the Rockies : The Denver and Rio Grande Western Railroad. Yale University Press. OCLC 500320.
- "Colorado Rail Annual, No. 11". 1981. ASIN B000NQ5UX8.
- Griffin, James R. (2003). Rio Grande Railroad. MBI Publishing Company LLC. ISBN 0-7603-1442-X.
- Grenard, Ross B. (1992). Rio Grande In Color, Volume 1. Morning Sun Books. ISBN 1-878887-11-4.
- Henderson, Charles William (1926). Mining in Colorado. Vol. U.S. Geologic Survey Professional paper 138. Washington, DC: Government Printing Office. p. 61. (Includes table of locations and dates of line extensions.)
- Sandrin, James (1998). Rio Grande In Color, Volume 2. Morning Sun Books. ISBN 1-878887-94-7.
- Starr, Timothy (2024). The Back Shop Illustrated, Volume 3: Southeast and Western Regions. Privately printed.
- Stewart, Paul Logan (1931). The History Of The Denver And Rio Grande Railway, 1871–1881 (Thesis). Boulder, Colorado: University of Colorado.
- Thode, Jackson C. (1972). A Century of Passenger Trains... And Then Some. Rocky Mountain Railroad Club.
