= D & RG Narrow Gauge Trestle =

- Cimarron Canyon trestle
- U.S. National Register of Historic Places
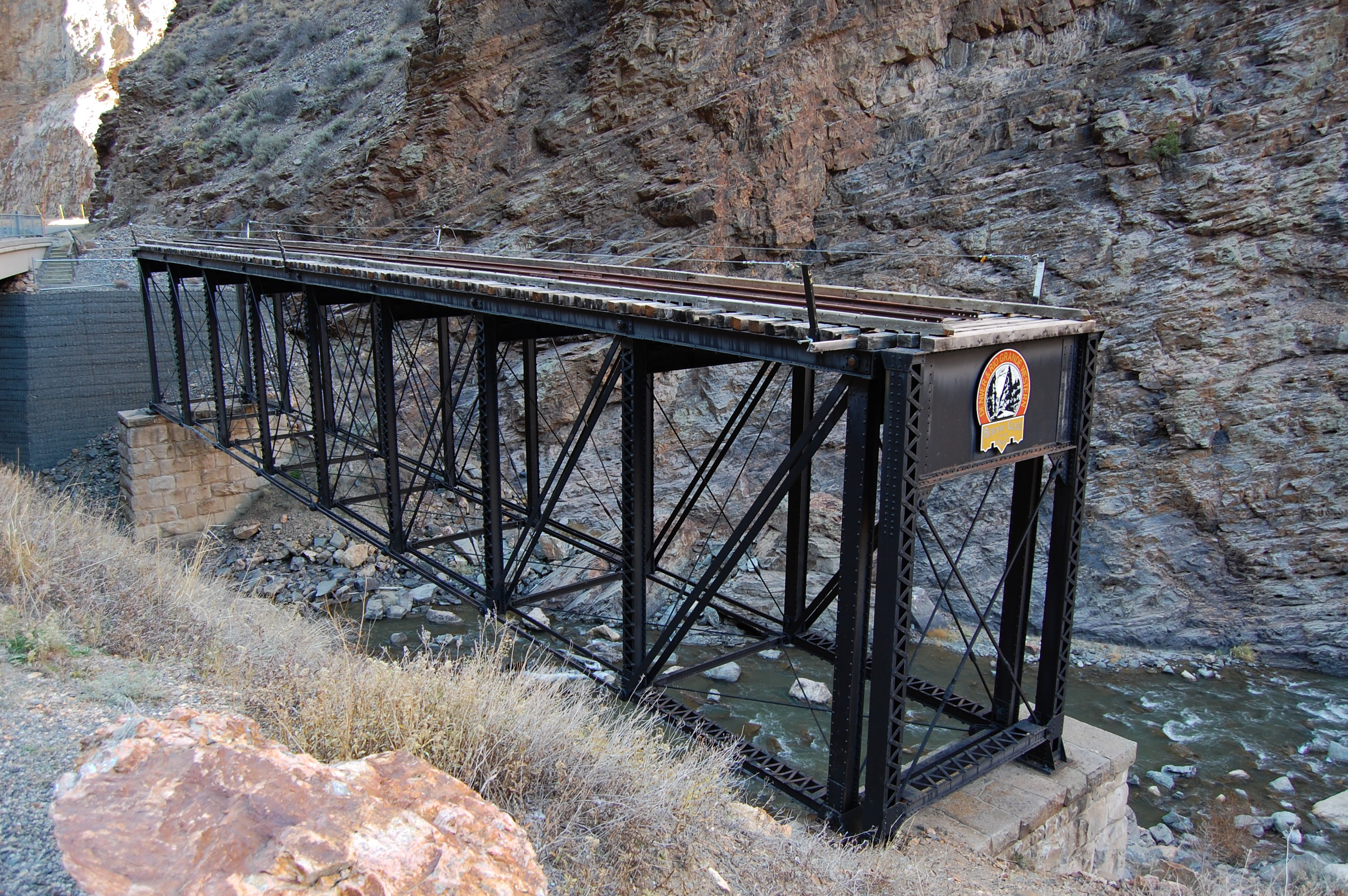
- Cimarron Canyon trestle, October 2012

- Location within Colorado Location within the United States
- Nearest city: Cimarron, Colorado
- Coordinates: 38°27′06″N 107°32′59″W
- Area: less than one acre
- Built: 1880; 146 years ago
- Architectural style: Pratt truss
- NRHP reference No.: 76000172
- Added to NRHP: June 18, 1976

The D&RG Narrow Gauge Trestle, also known as the Cimarron Canyon trestle, is a narrow-gauge railroad deck truss bridge crossing the Cimarron River near Cimarron, Colorado. Located within the Curecanti National Recreation Area, the trestle is the last remaining railroad bridge along the Denver & Rio Grande Railroad's Black Canyon route, a narrow-gauge passenger and freight line that traversed the famous Black Canyon of the Gunnison between 1882 and the 1940s.

== History ==
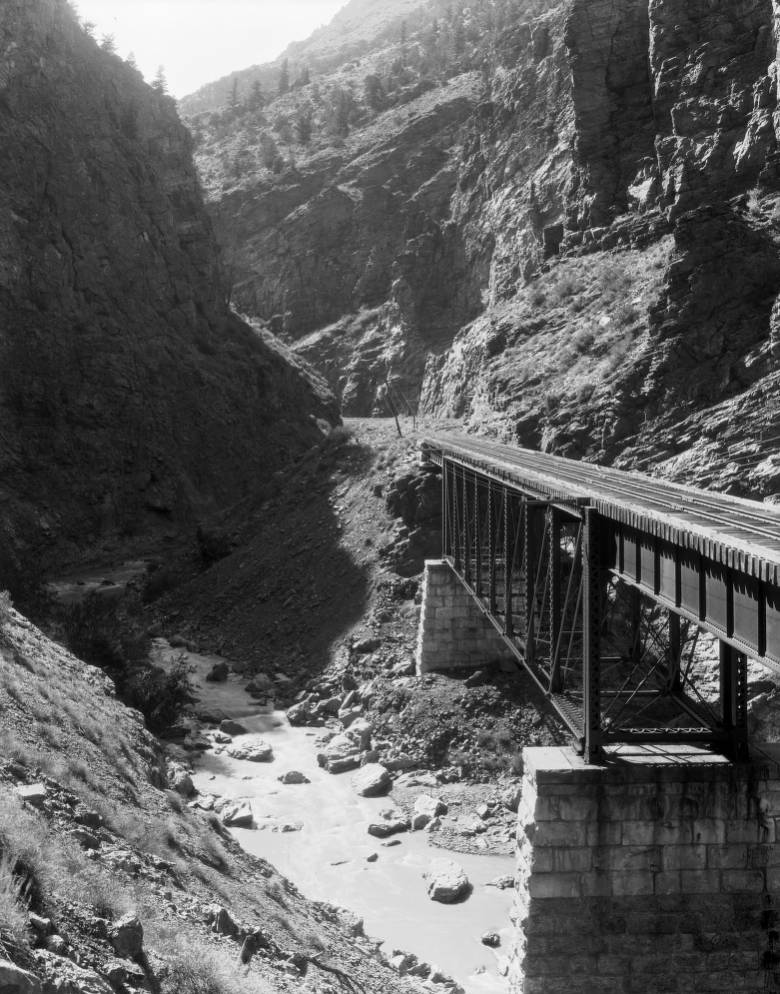
Early photo of the D&RGW Cimarron bridge (ca. 1920s)

The Pratt Truss-style bridge was constructed in 1895 by the Denver and Rio Grande Railroad, as part of the railroad's narrow gauge passenger and freight route between Gunnison and Montrose in Western Colorado. Crossing the turbulent Cimarron River just upstream from its confluence with the Gunnison River, the trestle replaced a wooden trestle built during the route's construction in 1882. Originally 288 feet (88 m) long, only the central span of it remains today. The last remaining Trestle on the route after the abandonment of the line in the 1950s and the inundation of the Gunnison in the 1960s, the structure was listed on the National Register of Historic Places in 1976.

== Static display ==
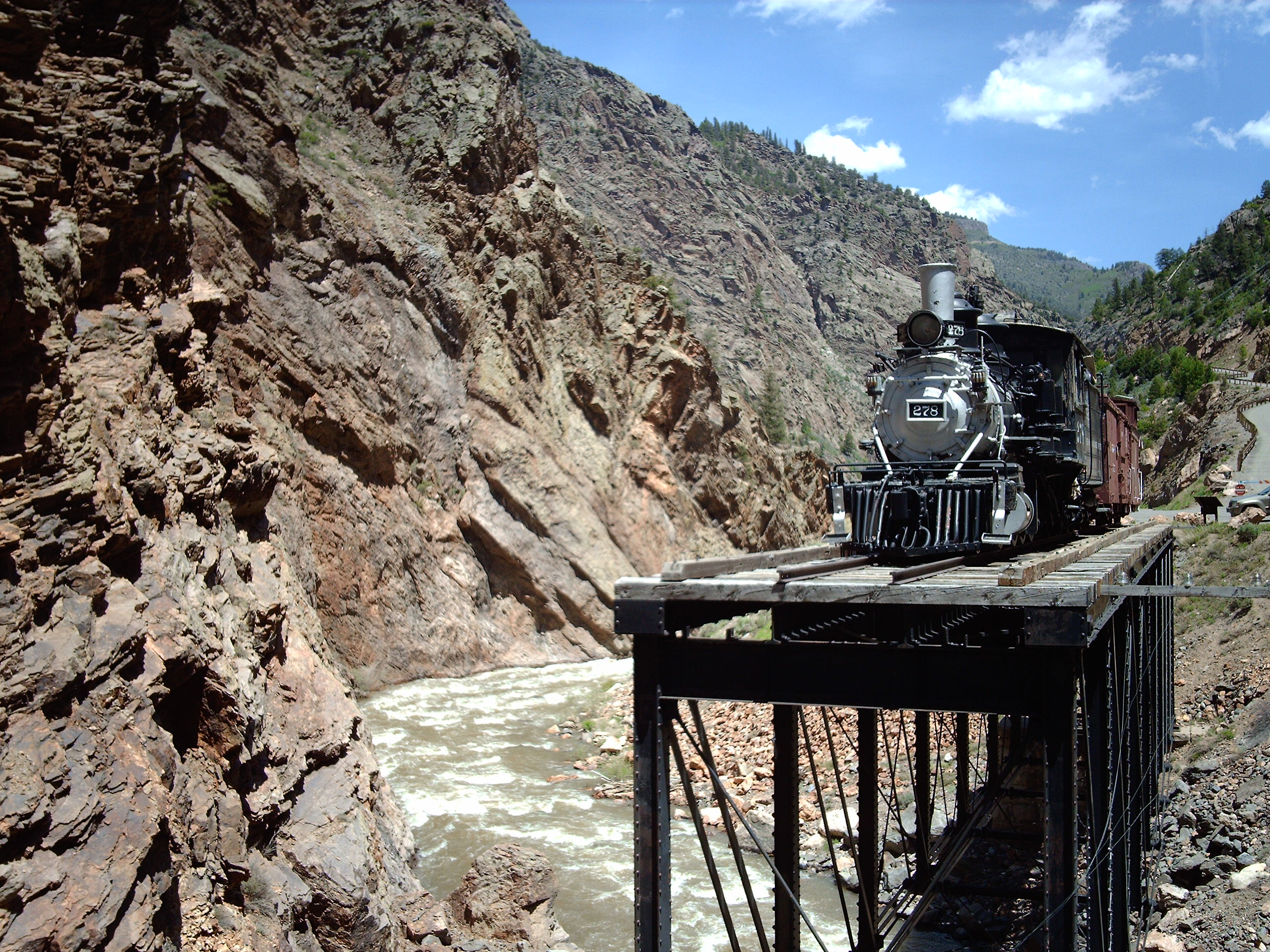
The trestle and its train before the 2010 restoration

Crossing the Cimarron River just upstream from its confluence with Crystal Reservoir, the bridge holds a static display composed of several pieces of railroad equipment. Representing the types of rolling stock used by the Denver and Rio Grande Railroad on the Black Canyon Route, the display includes a 2-8-0 steam locomotive, D&RGW No. 278, built by Baldwin Locomotive Works in 1882, a coal tender paired with the engine in 1935, a boxcar, D&RGW No.3132, built in 1904 by American Car and Foundry and a caboose, No. 0577, manufactured in 1886. Gifted by the railroad to the nearby town of Montrose in 1952, the engine, along with its tender and caboose, was leased to the National Park Service in 1973.

== 2010 restoration project ==
In July 2010, the National Park Service began a program of restoring the Cimarron Canyon trestle and the rolling stock displayed on it, including the D&RGW No. 278 steam locomotive. As a result, the stock was subsequently removed from the bridge and stored in a maintenance yard in Cimarron. While work on the bridge took place, the locomotive and rolling stock were sent to various firms in Colorado for cosmetic restoration. By late 2018, the entire restoration project had been completed and the D&RGW No. 278, coal tender, boxcar, and caboose were placed back on the trestle on October 26, 2018.

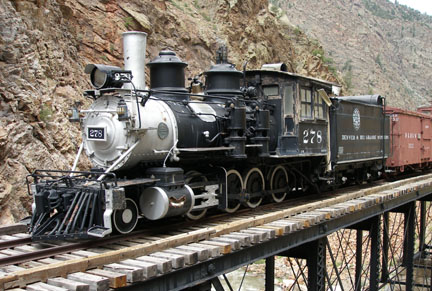
D&RG 278 as it appeared in its later years of service (ca 1940). National Park Service collection.

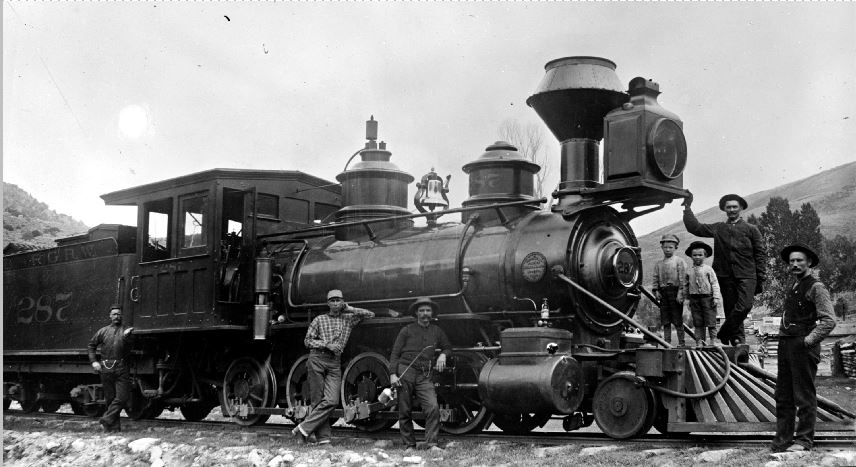
D&RG 287, at Cimarron, CO in 1885. This photo shows what D&RG 278 looked like originally, with a diamond stack, box headlight, trim on the domes, and a wooden pilot (cowcatcher).

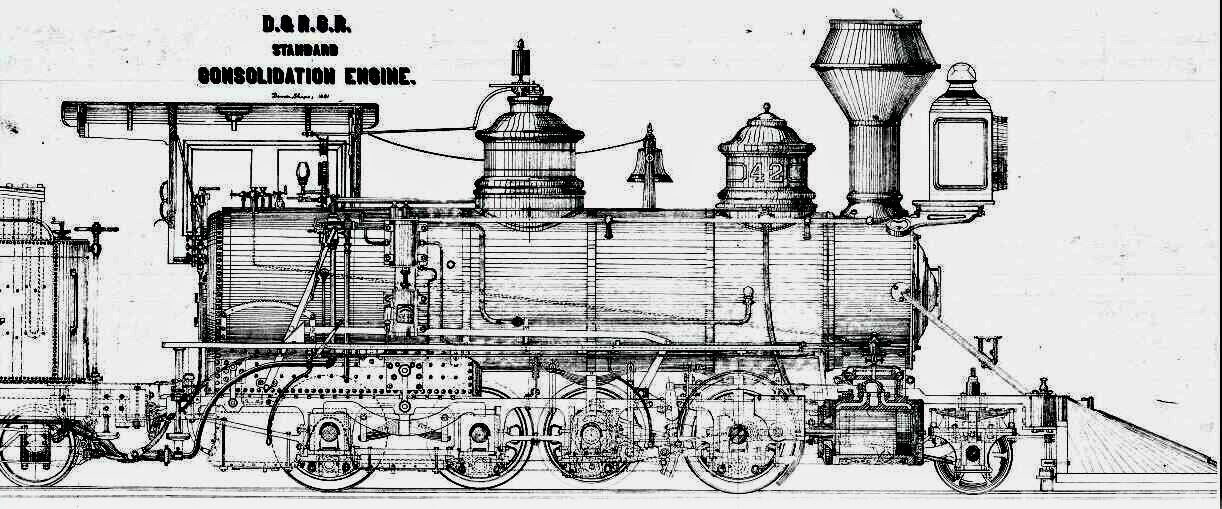
D&RG "Standard Consolidation Engine" - 1881. A "consolidation" is a 2-8-0 wheel arrangement.

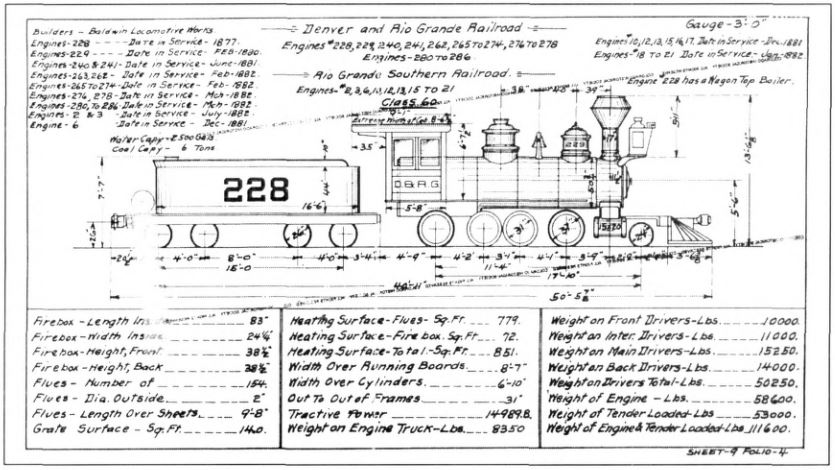
This engineering elevation drawing shows what D&RGW 278 and the other Class 60 (C-16) engines looked like in the 1800s.

== See also ==
- Rio Grande 168
- Rio Grande 169
- Rio Grande 223
- Rio Grande 268
- Rio Grande 315
- Rio Grande 463
