= Rio Grande 315 =

Preserved DR&GW C-18 class narrow-gauge steam locomotive

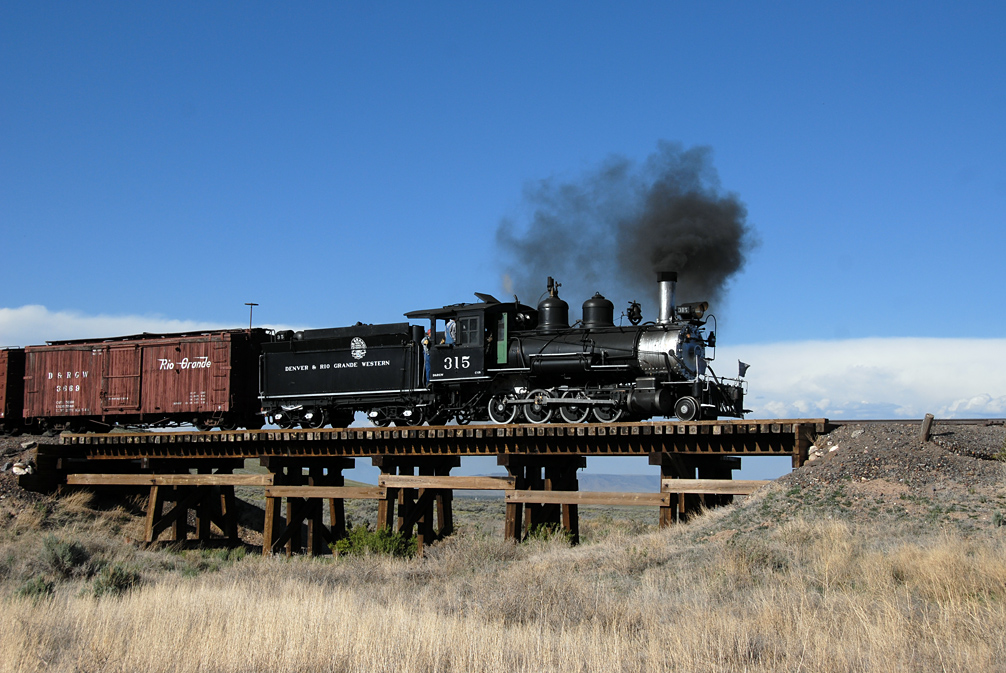
- No. 315 at the C&TS in 2008
Type and origin
- Power type: Steam
- Builder: Baldwin Locomotive Works
- Serial number: 14352
- Model: 10-26 E
- Build date: 1895
Specifications
- Configuration
  - Whyte: 2-8-0
  - UIC: 1′D n2
- Gauge: 3 ft (914 mm)
- Driver dia.: 38 in (965 mm)
- Adhesive weight: 64,000 lb (29.0 t)
- Loco weight: 72,000 lb (32.7 t)
- Fuel type: Coal
- Cylinders: Two, outside
- Cylinder size: 16 in × 20 in (406 mm × 508 mm)
Performance figures
- Tractive effort: 18,000 lbf (80.1 kN)
Career
- Operators: Florence and Cripple Creek Railroad; Denver and Rio Grande Railroad; Denver and Rio Grande Western Railroad; Durango Railroad Historical Society; Cumbres and Toltec Scenic Railroad (leased)
- Class: D&RG: Class 72; D&RGW: C-18
- Numbers: F&CC 3; D&RG 425; D&RGW 315
- Retired: 1950
- Restored: August 2007
- Current owner: Durango Railroad Historical Society
- Disposition: Operational
- Denver and Rio Grande Western Railroad Locomotive No. 315
- U.S. National Register of Historic Places
- Location: 479 Main Ave., Durango, Colorado
- Area: less than one acre
- Built: 1895
- Architect: Baldwin Locomotive Works
- Architectural style: Narrow gauge Consolidation
- NRHP reference No.: 08001008
- Added to NRHP: October 24, 2008

Denver and Rio Grande Western 315 is a C-18 class 2-8-0 "Consolidation" type narrow-gauge steam locomotive that was originally built for the Florence and Cripple Creek Railroad by the Baldwin Locomotive Works in 1895. It was purchased by the Denver and Rio Grande Railroad (D&RG) in 1917 and later became known as No. 315. It was retired in 1949 and had been on display at City of Durango parks until the Durango Railroad Historical Society restored the locomotive from 2001 to August 2007. It was operational from then until September 2021. On March 8, 2023, it returned to service, following its FRA federally mandated 1,472-day boiler inspection and overhaul. Most "sister" locomotives to No. 315 were scrapped, but two others survive today: D&RGW No. 318, on display at the Colorado Railroad Museum; and F&CC No. 10, currently in storage at the Nevada Southern Railroad Museum. The designation C-18 followed the D&RGW class-naming format from 1924 of a letter, “C” for Consolidation type, and a number “18” for its rated tractive effort of approximately 18,000 pounds.

== History ==
On the F&CC it was numbered 3 and named "Elkton". After the demise of the F&CC in 1915, the locomotive and sister locomotives sat unused in storage until the Denver & Rio Grande purchased it and four others in 1917 to help with war traffic. In D&RG service it was renumbered to No. 425, but was later renumbered to No. 315 when the Denver & Rio Grande reorganized/merged with the Rio Grande Western and became the Denver and Rio Grande Western in 1921.

It began its service on the D&RG at Alamosa, Colorado, was leased to the Rio Grande Southern in 1926–27, and then spent most of the next decade on the Gunnison Division, in Salida, on the line to Montrose, and on the branch to Ouray.

As larger locomotives such as the K-27, K-36 and K-37 Mikado locomotives were introduced to the line, smaller engines like No. 315 were given yard switching duties or scrapped. No. 315 spent several periods in the Alamosa shops during the early 1940s, notably with a broken main rod and then later for flue work and to replace its pilot with a switch engine pilot when it was assigned to yard switching duties at Durango, Colorado. The locomotive was then taken out of service in 1949.

== Retirement ==
Bob Richardson's March 1950 Publication of Narrow Gauge News mentioned that No. 315 and sister Locomotive No. 319 as well as 10 other D&RGW locomotives were to be scrapped later that year. A local Durango businessman Jackson Clark heard about this and spoke out about his family's heritage with Durango's railroad history and how one of these locomotives should be saved. He recognized No. 315 from seeing it performing switching duties around the Durango yard, so after he received backing from the Durango Rotary Club and from the City of Durango, he went to talk to the D&RGW and No. 315 was officially leased as a static display, presented to the City of Durango at Brookside Park on September 22, 1950.

The D&RGW would later on end up donating No. 315 to the Durango Chamber of Commerce in June 1968 while other efforts related to disposing most of the Narrow Gauge System took place. In 1986, the Chamber of Commerce moved to Gateway Park (now known as Santa Rita park) and No. 315 was moved with it. Ownership was then transferred to the City of Durango in December 2000.

== Movie credits ==
The Durango area became known as "Hollywood of the Rockies" for a period of time thanks to the scenery and the railroad, and No. 315 managed to score some roles on the silver screen. First appearing in the movie Colorado Territory in 1948, a year before its retirement.

No. 315 later returned to the silver screen for Michael Todd's 1956 Around the World in 80 Days. At first the D&RGW refused to let Michael Todd use No. 315 because of the lease they made to the City of Durango, but he insisted using the 315 and posted a $1,000,000 bond to the D&RGW that the locomotive would be returned in one piece. By then the locomotive was no longer able to operate under its own power, so it was pushed by a narrow gauge diesel locomotive leased from the US Army that was disguised as a baggage car for the movie. Modifications were made to the locomotive such as an installation of a steam generator and smoke machine that ended up damaging the tender cistern and smokebox, and despite the bond that was made, multiple parts had mysteriously disappeared upon No. 315's return to Brookside Park.

== Restoration ==
In 1995, No. 315 had received some cosmetic maintenance for the first time since it was placed back on display in Brookside park after the filming of Around the World in 80 Days. Many narrow gauge railfans, as well as members of a local model railroad club known as the San Juan Large Scalers, and more specifically member Tom Mosher were dissatisfied with the locomotive's appearance. Mosher had intended to do something about it and wanted to see the locomotive in its original condition, but was diagnosed with cancer later that year, and died in 1997. The club held a memorial service for Tom in front of the locomotive and later on started to consider the idea of adding the original lettering back and performing other maintenance to bring the locomotive to its 1930s appearance.

After speaking with city officials, the first work session was held in October 1998. The project was assisted by the D&SNG's Museum Curator Jeff Ellingson who redid the lettering and also evaluated No. 315's overall condition. Later on the SJLS' Board of Directors decided the project would be too big to perform under the club name, and formed the 315 Committee. Later in 1999, the committee reconsidered the end goal of the restoration and also decided to reorganize as a non-profit organization under the name of the Durango Railroad Historical Society.

In 2002 the boiler received a Hydrostatic and Ultrasonic test and was deemed to be in good condition for returning the locomotive to operational condition. It was then decided that the DRHS would go through with performing a complete restoration of No. 315. On August 24, 2007, a fire was lit inside No. 315's firebox at the D&S Roundhouse and that evening the locomotive moved under its own power for the first time in 58 years. The locomotive first ran at the D&SNG after fixing some minor issues and having to borrow D&RGW 223's tender trucks. It made its official shake down run on September 7 and pulled its first excursions in late September.

No. 315 was added to the National Register of Historic Places as Denver and Rio Grande Western Railroad Locomotive No. 315 in 2008 and the City of Durango transferred ownership of the locomotive to the DRHS in 2014.

== Operations since restoration ==
No. 315 has operated on the Durango and Silverton Narrow Gauge Railroad and the Cumbres and Toltec Scenic Railroad multiple times since its restoration. 315 was a common Attendee of the Railfest events held at the D&SNG from 2007 to 2016, visiting the C&TS often as well.

In 2016, No. 315 went to the C&TS to participate in their Narrow Gauge Rendezvous event. The DRHS and the C&TS then decided that the locomotive is to remain on C&TS property until at least 2025, where it played parts in the festivities associated with 37th National Narrow Gauge Convention, the C&TS opening day 2018 and 2019, multiple private charters, and the Victorian Iron Horse Roundup to celebrate the 50th anniversary of the C&TS. By the end of the C&TS 2021 season in October, the locomotive was required to receive its FRA federally mandated 1,472-day boiler inspection and overhaul. It later returned to service on March 8, 2023. In 2025 it was announced the locomotive would travel to the Colorado Railroad Museum by the end of the year. 315 arrived in Golden on November 19, 2025 and has been running the Polar Express Train Ride alongside Denver and Rio Grande Western Locomotive 491. She will stay in Golden until at least May 2026, where she will participate in events in the new year such as the Colorado Crossings which will be Florence and Cripple Creek themed with 3 F&CC locomotives being there, 20, 315 and 318, with 20 and 315 being operational alongside D&RGW 491.

== The DRHS in Silverton ==
When the locomotive isn't out running on the D&SNG or at the C&TS, it is stored in the original Silverton Northern Railroad Engine house. The DRHS has teamed up with the San Juan County Historical Society to restore the structure and turn the area into a historic, informational park. Rails were laid back inside the engine house in 2009 and since then the DRHS and SJCHS has rebuilt an amount of track on the original SNRR Grade with the help of the D&SNG, also tying into D&S Trackage on the Shenandoah loop for easy access to the D&SNG. In 2019, two spurs were built to display their collection of restored D&RGW Freight and MOW equipment. The DRHS has currently restored:

- Drop Bottom Gondola #871
- High Side Gondola #1400
- Stock Cars #5564 and #5627
- MOW Outfit/Bunk Car #04432
- 30 ft. Refrigerated Boxcar #39
- MOW Flanger #0T
- Flat Car #6215

== See also ==
- Rio Grande 168
- Rio Grande 169
- Rio Grande 223
- Rio Grande 278
- Rio Grande 463
- Denver and Rio Grande Western Railroad
- Rio Grande Southern Railroad
