= Rio Grande 223 =

Preserved D&RGW C-16 class narrow-gauge steam locomotive

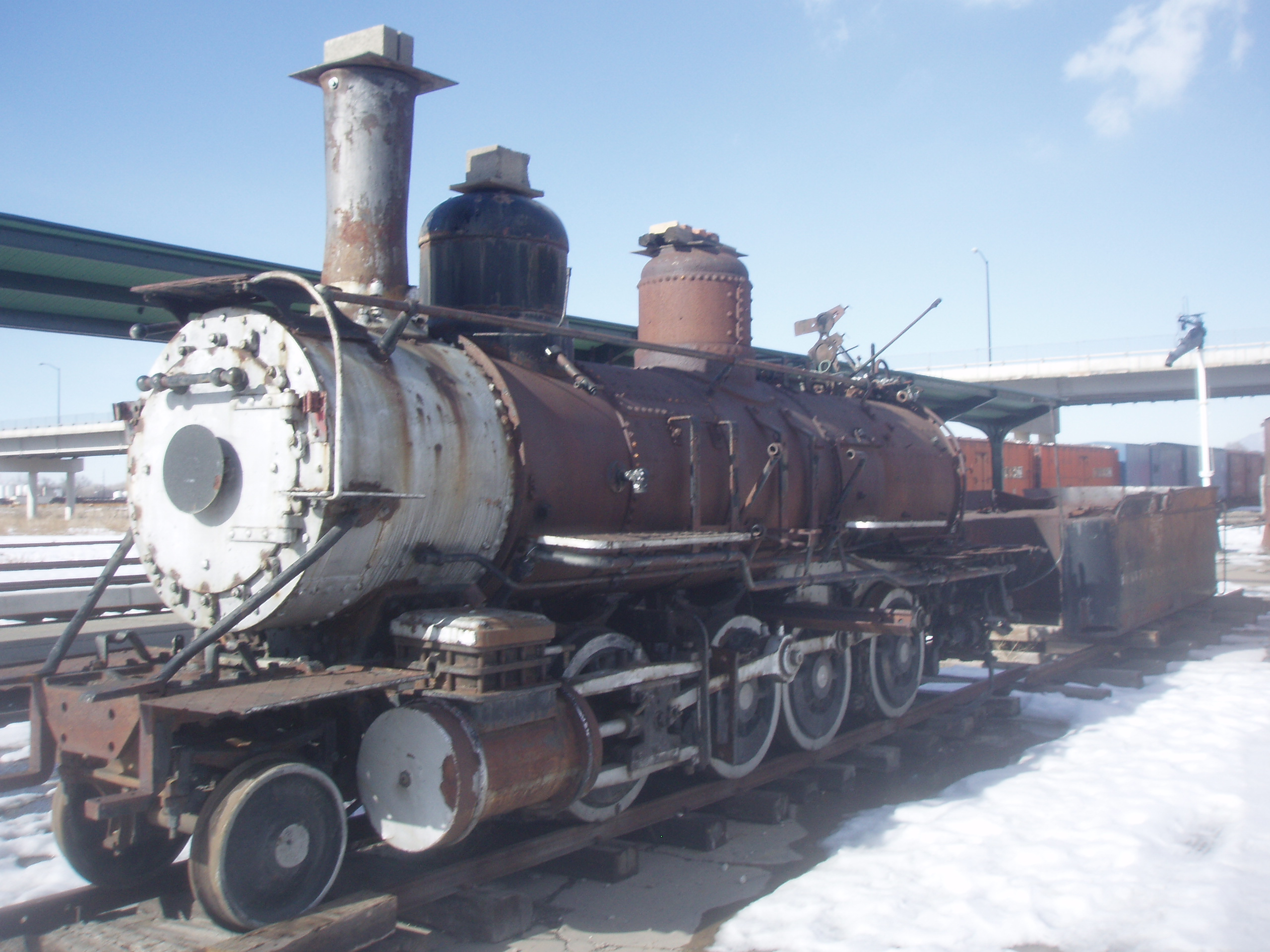
- No. 223 undergoing restoration in 2010
Type and origin
- Power type: Steam
- Builder: Grant Locomotive Works
- Serial number: 1436
- Build date: December 1881
Specifications
- Configuration
  - Whyte: 2-8-0
  - UIC: 1′D n2
- Gauge: 3 ft (914 mm)
- Driver dia.: 36 in (914 mm), later 37 in (940 mm)
- Adhesive weight: 50,000 lb (22.7 t), later 59,330 lb (26.9 t)
- Loco weight: 60,000 lb (27.2 t), later 69,105 lb (31.3 t)
- Fuel type: Coal
- Fuel capacity: 6 short tons (5.4 t; 12,000.0 lb)
- Water cap.: 2,500 US gal (2,081.7 imp gal; 9,463.5 L)
- Boiler pressure: 130 psi (0.90 MPa), later 145 psi (1.00 MPa)
- Cylinders: Two, outside
- Cylinder size: 15 in × 20 in (381 mm × 508 mm)
- Valve gear: Stephenson
- Valve type: Side valve
- Loco brake: Air
- Train brakes: Air
- Couplers: Knuckle
Performance figures
- Tractive effort: 13,813 lbf (61,440 N), later 14,989.8 lbf (66,678 N)
Career
- Operators: Denver and Rio Grande Railroad; Denver and Rio Grande Western Railroad
- Class: D&RG: 60; D&RGW: C-16
- Number in class: 28
- Numbers: D&RG 223; D&RGW 223
- Retired: 1941
- Current owner: 223 Locomotive Foundation
- Disposition: Undergoing restoration to operating condition
- Grant Steam Locomotive No. 223
- U.S. National Register of Historic Places
- Location within Colorado Location within the United States
- Location: Durango & Silverton Narrow Gauge Railroad, Durango, Colorado
- Coordinates: 37°17′51″N 107°52′14″W
- Area: 1 acre (0.40 ha)
- Built: 1881
- Architect: Grant Locomotive Works
- Architectural style: Consolidation type 2-8-0; Class C-16-60
- NRHP reference No.: 79002501
- Added to NRHP: May 23, 1979

Denver and Rio Grande Western 223 is a C-16 class 2-8-0 "Consolidation" type narrow-gauge steam locomotive built for the Denver and Rio Grande Railroad by the Grant Locomotive Works of Paterson, New Jersey in 1881–82. No. 223 was completed in December 1881, at a cost of $11,553. Rio Grande 223 is the only surviving narrow-gauge engine built by Grant Locomotive Works. D&RGW 223 and the other Class 60 engines were part of the Rio Grande's expansion into Colorado and Utah in the 1880s. Originally D&RG class 60, the designation C-16 followed the D&RGW class-naming format from 1924 of a letter, “C” for Consolidation type, and a number “16” for its rated tractive effort of approximately 16,000 pounds.

Retired from service in 1941, No. 223 was placed on display in Liberty Park in Salt Lake City, UT. In 1979, No. 223 was given to the Utah State Historical Society and began restoring the locomotive to operating condition in 1992. For nearly 3 decades, restoration work progressed slowly until 2020, when work on No. 223 was suspended. In July of 2025, the locomotive was sold to the 223 Locomotive Foundation, who are now restoring it to operating condition.

== History ==
=== Revenue service ===
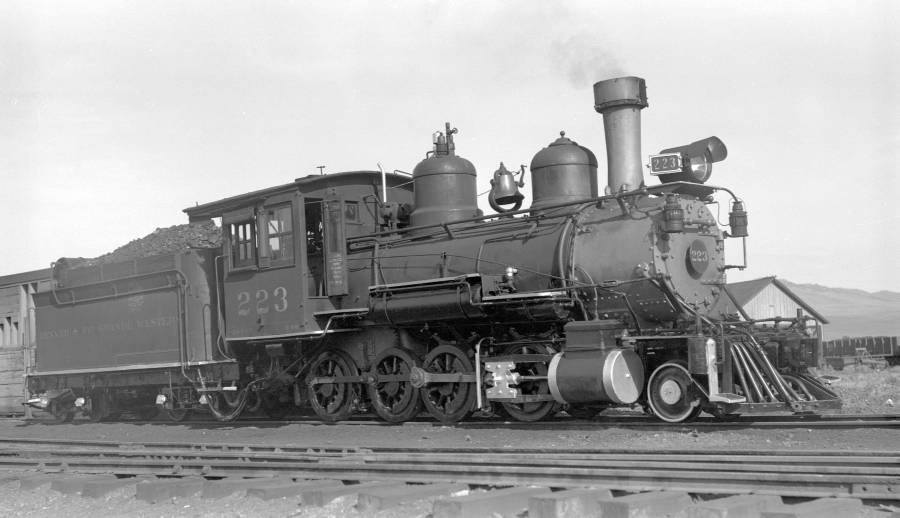
No. 223 in Gunnison, CO in 1940

In the 1880s, the Denver & Rio Grande rapidly expanded following the conclusion of the Royal Gorge War, with major construction projects along the San Juan Extension, the Chili Line, and the affiliate Denver & Rio Grande Western Railway building a line through the Utah Territory.

The first 2-8-0s delivered to the Denver & Rio Grande were built by Baldwin, becoming the D&RG's Class 60N locomotives. In 1881, orders were placed between both Baldwin and Grant Locomotive Works for more 2-8-0 locomotives. Grant was only the second non-Baldwin locomotive builder the Rio Grande had purchased locomotives from, with a single imported Fairlie locomotive from the Vulcan Foundry Co. from England as the only non-Baldwin locomotive on the Rio Grande prior.

223 was delivered alongside 23 other Grant-built locomotives later that year to the Denver & Rio Grande. 223 was delivered to the D&RG Burnham Shop in Denver, Colorado. Grant built Class 60Ns were different than their Baldwin counterparts with shorter smokeboxes, unique frames, and Grant style castings. 223 was initially assigned to work out of Salida, Colorado, and in those early years was recorded as having operated trains as far as Leadville, Colorado. The 223 and other Class 60Ns were premier power on the railroad, initially assigned to priority passenger and freight services.

When the Denver & Rio Grande split with the Denver & Rio Grande Western Railway, all of the Grant built locomotives including 223 were retained by the Colorado railroad. The rapid standard gauging of the former D&RGW.Ry mainline via successor Rio Grande Western in the following years cut off direct narrow gauge interchange from Colorado to Utah. Although the Utah State Historical Society suggests that the 223 worked in Utah, and the 223's National Register of Historic Places nomination included this, the Rio Grande Modeling and Historical Society's roster of locomotives does not show it in the Utah section on the Denver & Rio Grande Western Railway prior to the corporate split.

On December 11, 1892, the Denver & Rio Grande's Salida shops and roundhouse caught fire. The fire started in the waste box in the cab of D&RG No.419 and spread to the oil-soaked floor. Due to the city's fireplugs being shut off because of cold weather, the shop burned to the ground, taking the 223 with it. The 223 was rebuilt soon after and placed back in service.

Only 13 years later, the 223 was involved in another roundhouse fire, this time in Gunnison on January 17, 1905. The 223 again burned along with sister Class 60N No. 218. Both locomotives were rebuilt, and the 223's tender tank was replaced in April of the same year.

The Rio Grande Southern Railroad was known to lease locomotives from the D&RG. In 1907 the 223 and other Class 60N's were sent to the RGS, being returned to the D&RG in 1922. On September 12 of that year the 223 collided with Class 60N no. 222 in Chama, New Mexico. No records of the damage to either locomotive were kept. The merger of the Denver and Salt Lake Railroad with the Denver & Rio Grande in 1931 would lead to a new motive power classification scheme; and 223 along with other surviving Class 60Ns would become the C-16 class on the new Denver & Rio Grande Western. As they aged, the C-16s were gradually relegated to lower priority train services and branch line work, having been supplanted by more modern locomotives.

223's final operating location was along the Baldwin Branch. The Baldwin Branch was originally built by the Denver, South Park & Pacific (Colorado Southern) and retained its original wooden bridges. Although earlier timetables show the branch being rated for heavier locomotives, the remaining C-16s became the preferred locomotives permitted on the branch due to their light weight, and the 223 served on this portion of the D&RGW from 1937 to her retirement.

Most of the C-16s were retired by the late 1920s to mid-1930s; only one stayed in service until the mid-1950s (#268 was retired in 1955). The 223 was removed from service in 1941.

=== Display in Utah ===
The railroad leased 223 to Salt Lake City, beginning at the 1941 Pioneer Day celebration, for five years, and donated it to the city in 1952. The locomotive was given a fake diamond stack and an 1880s paint scheme in the Salida shops, before being sent to Salt Lake City. (A popular myth, caused by the mis-captioning of photographs, is that the 223 was moved on a special train led by four brand-new FT locomotives which was actually Rio Grande 268, which stopped in Utah on a 75th Anniversary Rio Grande tour in 1945 ). In 1952, upon the donation to the city, the Rio Grande's Salt Lake City shops removed the diamond stack and box headlight and repainted the 223 in its 1930s "button herald" paint scheme on their own time.

Shipped along with 223 were a narrow gauge boxcar, caboose, and high-side gondola, which were sent to Pioneer Village in the Lagoon Amusement Park in Farmington, Utah. These cars were later stored in Ogden in poor condition alongside 223 until they were burned in the 2006 Shupe-Williams Candy Factory Fire. 223 sat in the open at Liberty Park, gradually deteriorating from weather and vandalism until 1979, when the city gave it to the Utah State Historical Society. The locomotive would be relocated to display at the Rio Grande Depot in Salt Lake City. John Bush, then an employee of the Roaring Camp & Big Trees Railroad in California, was commissioned to make a report on the cost of potential restoration. Lack of budget limited success with the project and it was again transferred, to the Utah State Railroad Museum in 1992.

223 was stored behind the Shupe-Williams Candy Factory building just to the south of the Union Station, until the candy factory caught fire in 2006 and burned to the ground, taking with it three narrow gauge freight cars. However the cab had already been removed from the engine before the fire. 223 was then moved from there to its present location at the north end of the Utah State Railroad Museum complex next to the restoration shop. Limited restoration had been underway at its current location, Union Station, Ogden, Utah, with the tender and cab in the Museum's shop and the remainder sitting outside without boiler lagging.

It was rumored that during the 1979 move from Liberty Park to the Utah State Historical Society property, the frame and rods were bent badly so that the wheels would no longer turn, even with the rods disconnected. However, through analysis of historical photographs, it has been determined that the rods were in actuality bent during its display at Liberty Park to prevent it from rolling. The track on which the 223 was displayed sloped noticeably to the west, with no wheel stops or other end-of-track protection. A flat spot can be felt under the main rod 1 on the fireman's side of the engine where the jack was placed to bend it. The boiler is in very poor condition, having sat outside for fifty years with wet asbestos around it. The tender tank was entirely replaced.

== Restoration ==
=== Golden Spike R&LHS ===
Until 2020, restoration work was being done by the Golden Spike Chapter of the Railway & Locomotive Historical Society in the former Trainman's Building at the north end of the Ogden Union Station.

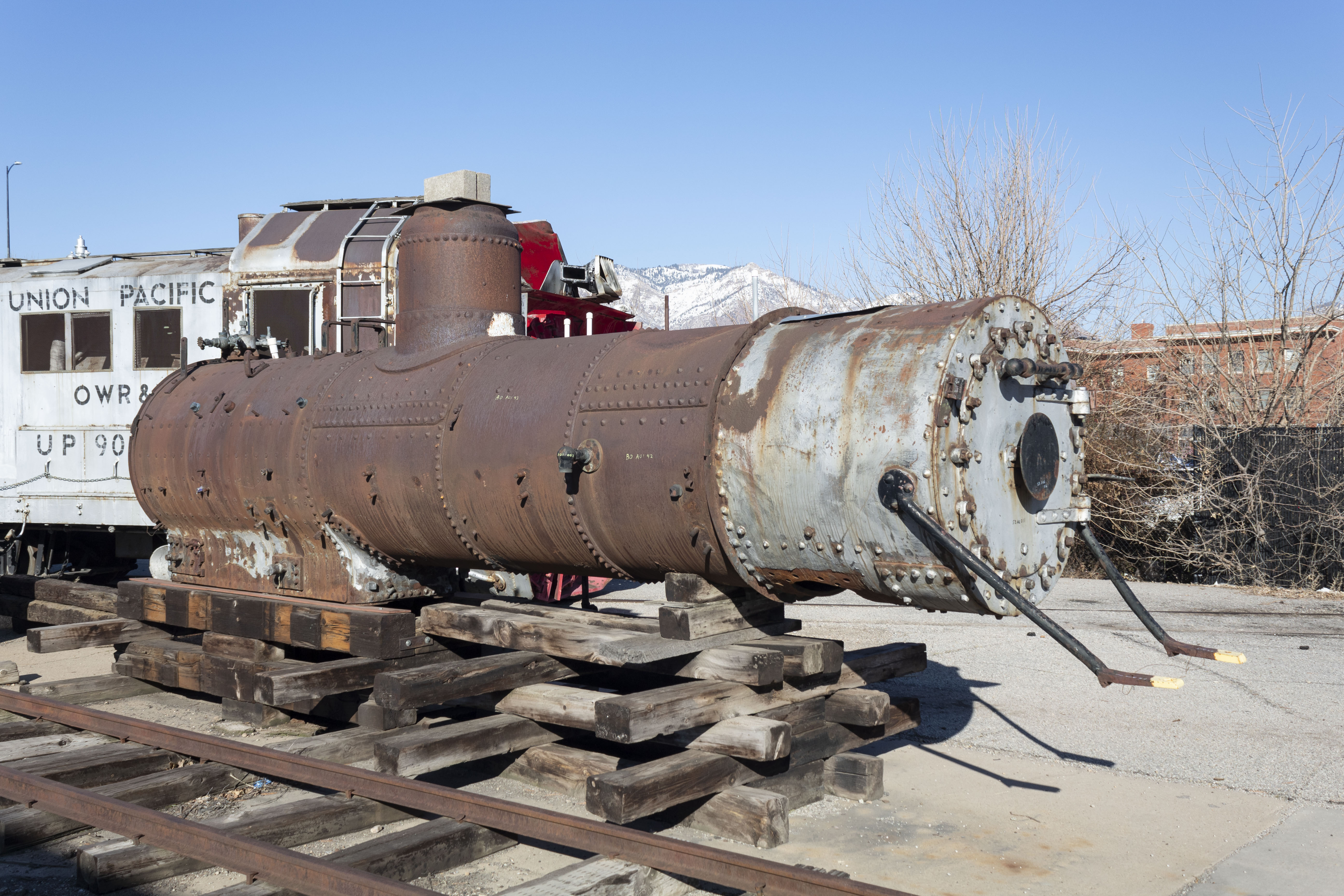
The boiler of Rio Grande 223 in storage at the Utah State Railroad Museum

Restoration began in 1992 using a boxcar, UP 910261, as a shop. The group soon outgrew this rudimentary shelter and was given the Trainman's Building after the Candy Factory fire in 2006. Ogden City paid for roof repairs, an alarm system and fluorescent lighting, and the restoration work was moved inside. At the same time the 223 was moved from its place behind the Shupe-Williams Candy Factory to the north end of the platform outside of the shop.

As of 2019, the wooden cab was completed, the appliances under repair, and work on the tender nearing completion. The Golden Spike Chapter worked according to the "pay-as-you-go" philosophy, completing work as they obtained the funds, resulting in slow but steady restoration progress. It was added to the National Register of Historic Places as Grant Steam Locomotive No. 223 in 1979.

In 2019, the R&LHS crew was locked out of the shop by Ogden City and refused to allow continued work on the locomotive at Union Station. In 2019, Steve Jones of the Golden Spike RLHS approached the Cumbres and Toltec Scenic Railroad (whose then president John Bush had written the earlier 1980 restoration proposal for 223) with a proposal that the railroad could help sponsor continued restoration efforts on 223. In October 2020, restoration of the 223 was officially halted. The State of Utah then expressed interest in moving the locomotive to a static display in Salt Lake City. Tools and equipment from the R&LHS that were used on the 223 have been donated to the Cumbres and Toltec Scenic Railroad. Stathi Pappas chief mechanical officer of the California Western Railroad and the Stockton Locomotive Works inspected the locomotive in 2021 on behalf of the R&LHS Golden Spike Chapter to determine the feasibility of resuming restoration work.

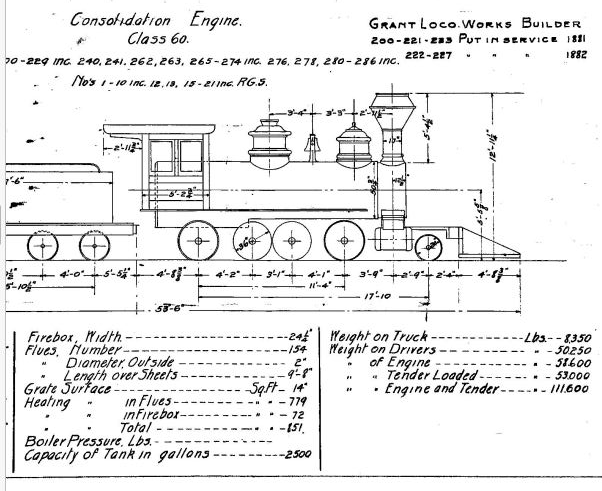
Denver & Rio Grande Railroad, 2-8-0 Engines (Consolidations), Class 60

An ownership issue between Salt Lake City and the State of Utah was resolved in April 2023, legally ensuring ownership of the locomotive was with the Utah State Historical Society. In October 2023, ownership was transferred from the Utah State Historical Society to the City of Ogden. At the time of the transfer, Ogden City officials expressed their hope to resume the locomotive restoration. Steve Jones head of the R&LHS Golden Spike chapter criticized the ownership transfer in a quote published in the Standard-Examiner saying "Ogden City has not been very good at maintaining any of the collection. It's hard to tell what they're going to do with 223."

=== 223 Locomotive Foundation ===
On October 28, 2025, Ogden City announced a partnership to finish the restoration in conjunction with the Colorado Railroad Museum. The locomotive was transferred to new ownership under the 223 Locomotive Foundation. Several appliances for 223 owned by the Golden Spike R&LHS (such as the locomotive's headlight) were shortly afterwards donated to the 223 Locomotive Foundation in November 2025, with chapter president Steve Jones congratulating Ogden City on making the choice to let the locomotive go to Colorado.

On June 8, 2026 the tender & cab were moved from Ogden and delivered to the Durango and Silverton Narrow Gauge Railroad to resume restoration work. 223 Locomotive Foundation president Jimmy Booth at the time of the move, expressed a goal the restoration would be completed within two to four years, and that the locomotive would travel to various narrow gauge railways across the United States once in steam.

== See also ==
- Rio Grande 168
- Rio Grande 169
- Rio Grande 268
- Rio Grande 278
- Rio Grande 315
- Rio Grande 463
