= Gale B. Aydelott =

Gale B. Aydelott (July 22, 1914 – February 16, 1991), better known as "Gus Aydelott," was an American railroad president. He headed the Denver and Rio Grande Western Railroad for nearly three decades.

== On the Grande ==
Aydelott became president of the Rio Grande with the death of Judge Wilson McCarthy in 1956. He was 41 years old, and had been with the company since graduating from the University of Illinois in 1936. Judge McCarthy cast a long shadow over the property, having been one of its receivers from 1934 until it emerged from reorganization in 1947, at which point he became president of the road. Aydelott would serve as president from 1956 through 1977, at which point he was promoted to chairman of the board of directors. W.J. "Bill" Holtman succeeded Aydelott as president. Aydelott retired from the Rio Grande in 1983.

Professor Don L. Hofsommer writes in Railroads in the Age of Regulation, "Aydelott rose through the ranks . . . learning the necessity of continually maintaining and upgrading railroad properties . . . . He completed dieselization, ordered more rolling stock, and insisted on new and heavier rail for the main routes . . . . At the same time [he] energetically sought to guard the company's frontiers - - a difficult task, given the strong railroads bracketing the Rio Grande." Hofsommer quotes Aydelott as of 1963, the Rio Grande President saying "We are proud of what we have done as a separate road, and we think we can continue to do a better job for ourselves and our territory by staying that way." To do this, Hofsommer notes, Aydelott "required that the Rio Grande pay special attention to the needs of customers, who had a choice not only among rail carriers, but, more importantly, also among the various modes of transportation." Aydelott focused on keeping his sales forces constantly in touch with their shippers, and his operating department moving Rio Grande trains expeditiously. In these efforts he was very successful, Hofsommer noting "The Rio Grande . . . gained a favorable reputation among shippers by following this path." Aydelott himself became one of the railroad industry's "most respected leaders."

In 1963, the company joined Trailer Train (now TTX Company), instituting trailer-on-flat-car (TOFC) service over the Rio Grande.

According to a Trains magazine article in April, 1965 the company operated seven named freight trains: Rock Island Merchandise Special; Lumber Special via Denver; Red Ball Extra; Midwest Merchandiser; SP Forwarder via Pueblo; SP Forwarder via Denver; and the Advance.

While the company's freight traffic continued to grow, private passenger vehicles and commercial airlines eroded the company's passenger traffic. As a result, May 28, 1967, was the last run of the Rio Grande's Prospector; July 27, 1967, was the last run of the Rio Grande's Royal Gorge, and in March 1970, the Rio Grande's portion of the California Zephyr was cut from daily to thrice-weekly service.

Under Aydelott's administration the Rio Grande formed a holding company, Rio Grande Industries, in 1969, to diversify and expand into other fields. These grew to include real estate development, industrial contracting and insurance. By the time Aydelott stepped down as president, Rio Grande Industry's annual income topped $305 million, most of it derived from the railroad's freight traffic.

== The Perlman influence ==
Gus Aydelott's early career was a who's who of mid-twentieth-century railroaders. His father, James H. Aydelott, was superintendent of transportation on the Chicago, Burlington and Quincy Railroad. When the Burlington was struck by vicious flooding circa 1932–3, and in an effort to repair its western lines the Northern Pacific Railway lent out Alfred E. Perlman. Perlman started as a draftsman on the NP, but quickly moved up to roadmaster positions, maintaining the railway's physical plant. Marked for advancement, the NP sent him to Harvard Business School for additional training. Shortly thereafter, he spent time with the Reconstruction Finance Corporation, which sent him to evaluate the state of several ailing railroads, including the Rio Grande. Leaving the RFC, he was hired by the Burlington, where his first assignment was overseeing the reconstruction of flood-damaged lines in Colorado, Nebraska, and Kansas.

This busy period in Perlman's life brought him to the attention of the Burlington's fabled president, Ralph Budd, as well as Judge Wilson McCarthy of the Rio Grande. After his short time with the Burlington, Perlman left to become chief engineer of the Rio Grande. While there, he employed future railroad presidents Gus Aydelott and John C. Kenefick. On the Rio Grande Aydelott would be Kenefick's boss as they worked on track improvement projects. Impressed by Kenefick's work ethic and can-do attitude, he promoted him to roadmaster at Steamboat Springs, Colorado.

Perlman ultimately left to head up the New York Central, with Kenefick following. Kenefick, however, left the Central before its ill-starred merger with the Pennsylvania Railroad, traveling to Omaha, Nebraska, as president of the Union Pacific Railroad. Perlman's career nearly came to an end in the wake of the unsuccessful Penn Central Transportation Company merger of the New York Central and the Pennsy, which in 1970 resulted in the largest bankruptcy in the U.S. to that time.

However, Perlman was brought in to resuscitate the ailing Western Pacific Railroad. The legacy of these three careers came full circle in a series of mergers. In 1983 the former owners (circa 1924) of the Rio Grande, the Western Pacific and the Missouri Pacific, were merged into Kenefick's Union Pacific. In 1988 the Rio Grande absorbed the ailing Southern Pacific Transportation Company, adopting the name of its larger rival. In 1996, the Union Pacific absorbed the Southern Pacific, creating the largest rail system in North America.
