= Wilson McCarthy =

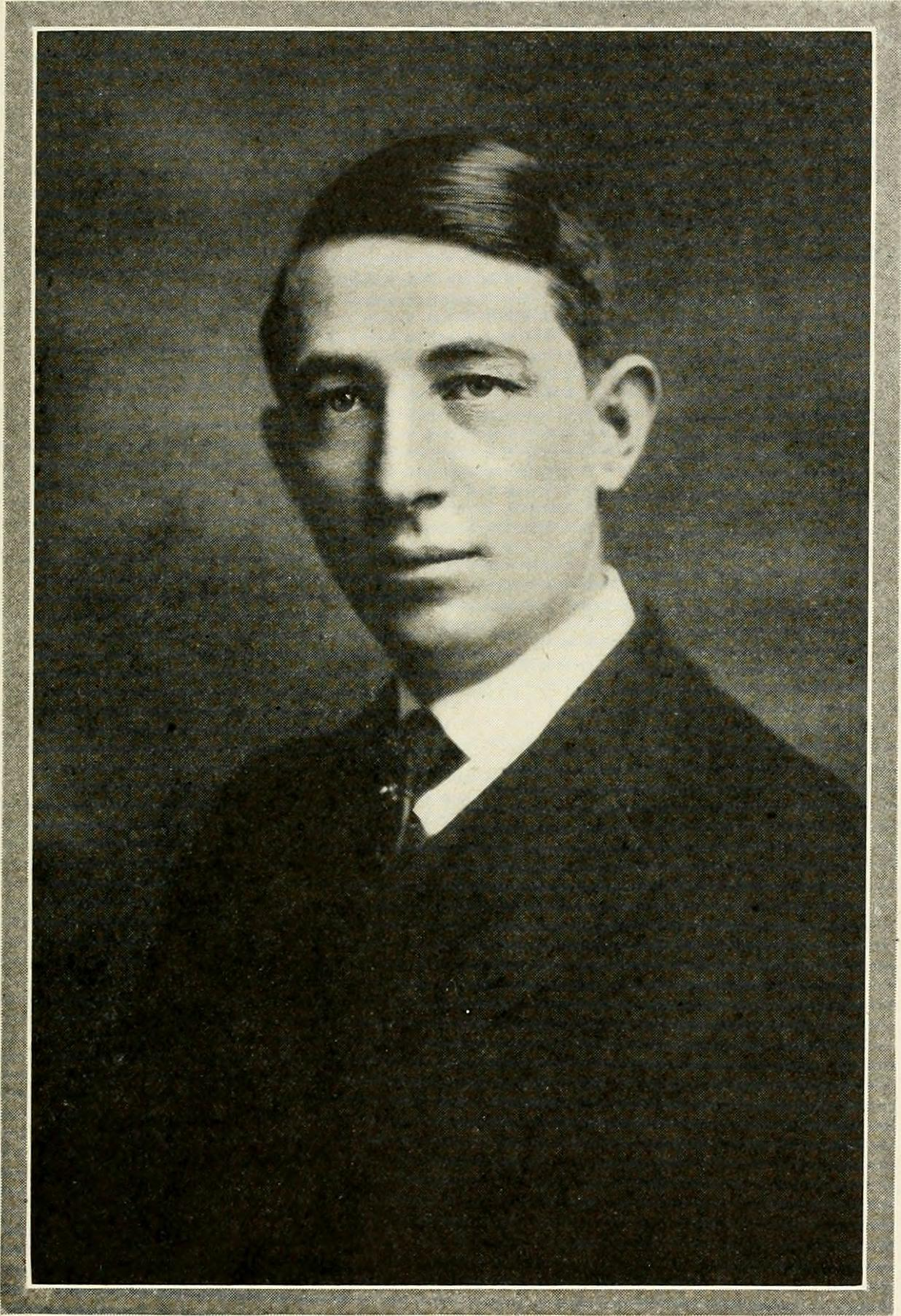
Wilson McCarthy (as published in Utah since statehood, historical and biographical, 1919)

Wilson McCarthy (July 24, 1884 – 1956) was an American attorney, jurist and railroad executive.

== Early life ==
According to author Will Bagley, McCarthy's grandfather immigrated to the United States from Ireland circa 1847 in the midst of the Great Famine. McCarthy's father Charles, born in Ohio in 1850, traveled to Utah, where he became a stage coach driver. He converted to the Church of Jesus Christ of Latter-day Saints when he married Mary Mercer in 1876. Mary Wilson failed to conceive, so Charles took her sister as a second wife, later going to prison as a polygamist. Ironically, Mary Wilson then gave birth to two sons in quick succession, the second being Warren Wilson McCarthy. McCarthy was born in American Fork, Utah on July 24, 1884. The family emigrated to Alberta, Canada, where McCarthy grew up as a ranch hand and cowboy. Boots and western wear became the "standard attire for the rest of his life."

Denver novelist Sandra Dallas notes McCarthy was a colorful character in more ways than just his attire. "He accused his predecessor of having 'cracked ice pumping through your veins.' And he apparently was not as strait-laced as his Latter-day Saint upbringing might suggest, because he once invited his son to meet his mistress."

Wilson served a mission for the Church of Jesus Christ of Latter-day Saints to his family's ancestral land of Ireland. Upon returning to the United States, however, he gave up on his cowboy lifestyle, marrying Minerva Woolley in 1910, moving to New York City and entering law school at Columbia University.

== Career ==
After obtaining his law degree, Wilson returned to Utah, where he entered politics in the Democratic Party, worked as a district attorney, and was ultimately appointed to a judgeship on Utah's Third District Court in 1919. He left the bench in barely a year, going on to earn a sizable fortune in private practice. In 1926 he was elected to the state senate. In the wake of the Wall Street crash of 1929, he was appointed by Republican President Herbert Hoover to the Reconstruction Finance Corporation in 1932, even though McCarthy was a Democrat. Again, he served scarcely a year, this time leaving politics for a career in banking in San Francisco, California.

In 1934, RFC Chairman Jesse H. Jones asked McCarthy to take control of the Denver and Rio Grande Western Railroad, which had just defaulted on a $10 million loan. The Rio Grande was back in court the following year, petitioning for reorganization under the Federal Bankruptcy Act. U.S. District Court Judge John Foster Symes appointed Denver's Henry Swan and McCarthy co-trustees. Thus began a two decade odyssey for McCarthy, the ultimate beneficiary being a rehabilitated Rio Grande.

Despite its inability to pay interest on $122 million in debt, McCarthy and Swan worked to repair and rebuild the Rio Grande. In 1937 alone the two pumped $18 million into the property. Under McCarthy's administration, the Rio Grande built over 1,130 bridges and laid over two million ties. At one point during the Great Depression, the Rio Grande spent one million dollars a year for five years running. The road also bought its first new motive power in over ten years. By 1940 the McCarthy receivership spent over $20 million upgrading the Rio Grande. By the end of World War II, the Rio Grande's revenues increased from $17 million to $75 million per year. In 1942 alone, revenues increased by a staggering 905 percent.

At the same time, the Rio Grande moved to trim or eliminate its fabled narrow gauge system. In conjunction with the Chicago, Burlington and Quincy Railroad it built the Dotsero Cut-Off (completed 1935). The Salt Lake and Denver and its vital Moffat Tunnel line (completed 1927) were absorbed, anchoring the Rio Grande between Salt Lake City, Utah, and Denver, Colorado. This allowed the Rio Grande to cut its freight time between these two points from 54 to under 24 hours.

Again working with Ralph Budd of the Burlington, McCarthy, in conjunction with the Western Pacific Railroad, began the streamlined California Zephyr service between Chicago, Illinois, and the Bay Area. During McCarthy's tenure the train's signature vista-dome cars were added.

Civically minded, McCarthy worked to help bring Geneva Steel to Utah, promoted stock shows in Colorado, and served on the planning commission celebrating the centennial of the arrival of Mormon pioneers in Salt Lake in 1947.

In 1947 the Rio Grande emerged from the co-trusteeship. The Interstate Commerce Commission approved a reorganization plan. Though opposed to the U.S. Supreme Court by both the Missouri Pacific Railroad and the Western Pacific Railroad, the reorganization committee elected a new board of directors, naming John Evans chairman and McCarthy president. (The MP and WP controlled the Rio Grande for a period beginning October 29, 1924, under the planning of George J. Gould and Benjamin Franklin Bush.)

Though passenger traffic waned in the wake of World War II, McCarthy's efforts to develop agriculture and industry along the Rio Grande's routes paid off in heavier traffic loads and increased receipts. He died in 1956 and was succeeded by Gale B. Aydelott, president of the Rio Grande through 1977.

== Personal life ==
McCarthy married Minerva Woolley on June 22, 1910. They had five children together. McCarthy suffered a stroke while in Washington, D.C., and he died at Holy Cross Hospital in 1956. His funeral was presided over by The Church of Jesus Christ of Latter-day Saints President David O. McKay. On the day of his funeral, every Rio Grande train stopped at 11 a.m. and their crews observed two minutes of silence.

After his death, the Rio Grande renamed their business car No. 100 as the Wilson McCarthy. (The car was renamed Kansas when the Rio Grande absorbed the Southern Pacific circa January 1986.)
