= Rio Grande 268 =

Preserved American steam locomotive

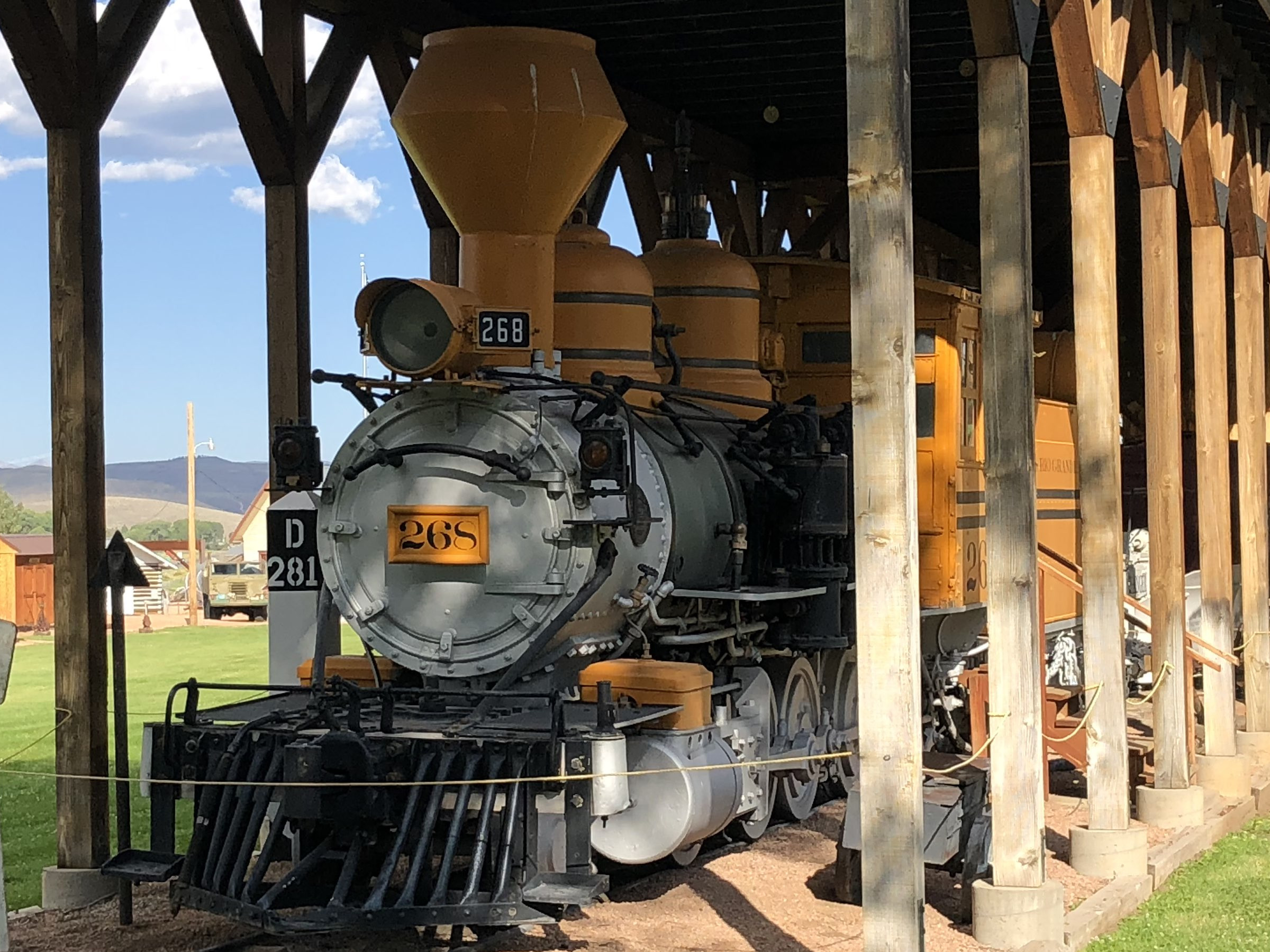
- No. 268 on display in Gunnison.
Type and origin
- Power type: Steam
- Builder: Baldwin Locomotive Works
- Serial number: 6002
- Build date: 1882
- Total produced: 57 (Baldwin Locomotive Works)
Specifications
- Configuration
  - Whyte: 2-8-0
  - UIC: 1′D n2
- Gauge: 3 ft (914 mm)
- Driver dia.: 36 in (914 mm), later 36.75 in (933 mm)
- Adhesive weight: 50,000 lb (22.7 t), later 59,330 lb (26.9 t)
- Loco weight: 60,000 lb (27.2 t), later 69,105 lb (31.3 t)
- Fuel type: Coal
- Fuel capacity: 6 short tons (5.4 t; 12,000.0 lb)
- Water cap.: 2,500 US gal (2,081.7 imp gal; 9,463.5 L)
- Boiler pressure: 130 psi (0.90 MPa), later 145 psi (1.00 MPa)
- Cylinders: Two, outside
- Cylinder size: 15 in × 20 in (381 mm × 508 mm)
- Valve gear: Stephenson
- Valve type: Side valve
- Loco brake: Air
- Train brakes: Air
- Couplers: Knuckle
Performance figures
- Tractive effort: 13,813 lbf (61,440 N), later 14,989.8 lbf (66,678 N)
Career
- Operators: Denver and Rio Grande Railroad; Denver and Rio Grande Western Railroad
- Class: D&RG: 60; D&RGW: C-16
- Number in class: 57
- Numbers: D&RG 268; D&RGW 268
- Retired: 1955
- Current owner: City of Gunnison
- Disposition: On static display

Rio Grande 268 is a C-16 class 2-8-0 "Consolidation" type narrow-gauge steam locomotive, built for the Denver and Rio Grande Western Railroad by the Baldwin Locomotive Works in 1882. It is one of three surviving locomotives in D&RG class 60. The later designation C-16 followed the D&RGW class-naming format from 1924 of a letter, “C” for Consolidation type, and a number “16” for its rated tractive effort of approximately 16,000 pounds.

== Early history ==
At the start of the 1880s, the Denver & Rio Grande was expanding rapidly. Major lines extended south toward Santa Fe, southwest toward Silverton and west to the Utah state line. As a result, the railroad placed several orders for 2-8-0s from Baldwin and Grant Locomotive Works. 268 was one of an order of 30 locomotives in August 1881, and was completed in January of the next year.

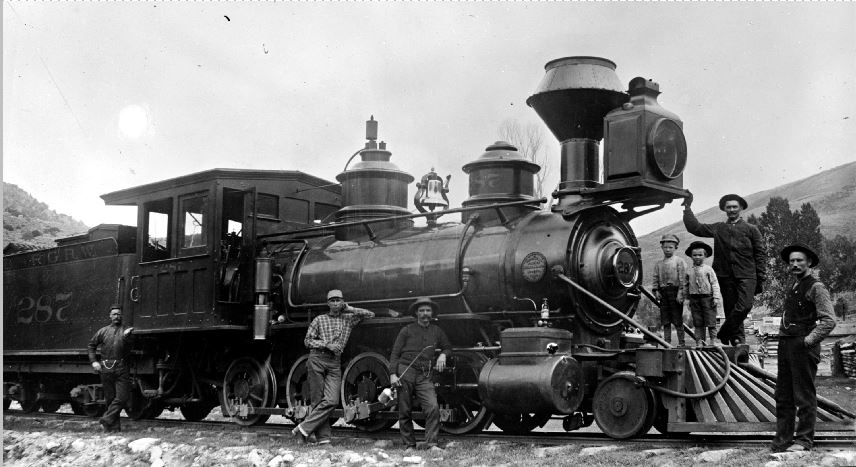
D&RG 287 (Class 60, C-16) in Cimarron, Colorado in 1885. (Colorado Railroad Museum collection)

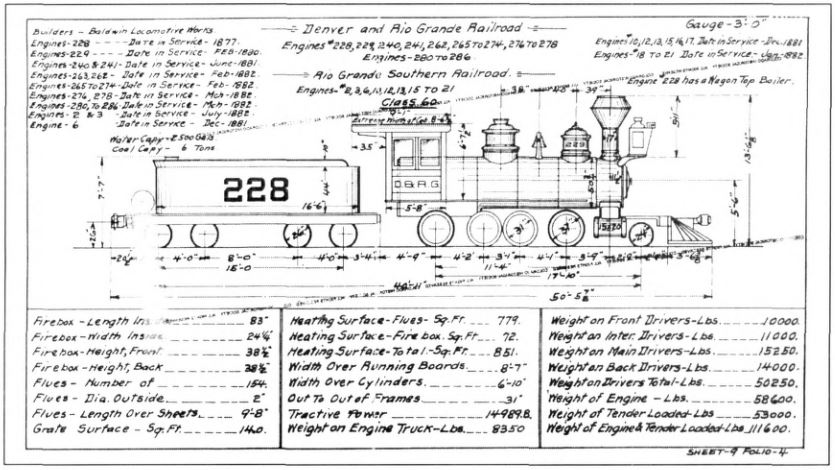
Railroad folio diagram for Baldwin-built Class 60 locomotives.

268 spent most of its working life around Gunnison, Colorado, with an early photograph showing it in helper service on the mainline to Montrose. Other early photographs show the engine in Salida and Alamosa.

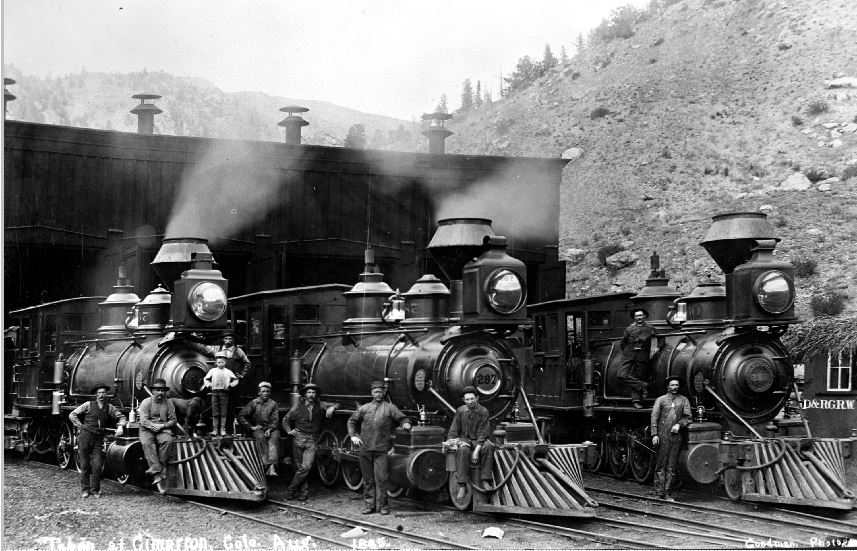
D&RG 260, 267 and 287 (Class 60, C-16 engines) at the Cimarron, Colorado roundhouse, 1885. (Colorado Railroad Museum collection)

In the 1800s, D&RGW 268 and her sister engines were the premier motive power for the railroad, hauling passenger trains and top-priority freight trains. Decades later, in the 20th century, the aging narrow-gauge engine was relegated to low-priority trains on secondary and branch lines.

== Historic recognition and current status ==
As early as 1945, 268 was recognized for its historic significance when it featured on the Rio Grande's 75th Anniversary Tour. Again in 1949, the engine powered an excursion train running the length of the grounds at the Chicago Railroad Fair, this time in a version of the road's diesel colors of yellow and silver with black stripes, but lettered (along with the train's coaches) for the fictional "Colorado Springs and Tincup Railroad". 268 also featured in the 1952 film Denver and Rio Grande before returning to ordinary service in the Gunnison area. The engine's final run for the D&RGW was in 1954. It was used by a contractor in 1955 to scrap branch lines out of Gunnison, Colorado.

After its retirement, 268 was donated to the city of Gunnison, Colorado. It featured in Colorado's centennial celebrations in 1959, then moved to its current location at the Gunnison Pioneer Museum in 1964. The engine today is cosmetically restored in its yellow and silver paint scheme.

== See also ==
- Rio Grande 223
- Rio Grande 278
