= Otto Perry =

American railroad photographer

Rock Island EMC TA locomotive #604, photographed by Otto Perry in 1940

Otto Perry (1894–1970) was an American photographer and railfan specializing in railroad photos. Perry worked as a mailman in Denver, Colorado, where he met and became friends with Louis McClure, another noted photographer.

By the time Perry died, his collection contained more than 20,000 photos, from all parts of North America. They were donated to the Western History Department of the Denver Public Library and have been made available for viewing on the internet.

== See also ==
- Category:Otto Perry images
