= List of Durango and Silverton Narrow Gauge Railroad rolling stock =

The rolling stock of the Durango and Silverton Narrow Gauge Railroad includes steam and diesel locomotives, passenger coaches, concession cars, open observation cars, cabooses, and other specialized equipment. Its steam locomotive roster includes examples of the K-28, K-36, and K-37 classes formerly operated by the Denver and Rio Grande Western Railroad, while its diesel fleet includes center-cab locomotives and DL-535E locomotives acquired from the White Pass and Yukon Route.

The railroad's passenger rolling stock includes cars dating from the late 19th century as well as equipment built or rebuilt by the D&SNG. Several locomotives formerly owned by the railroad were later traded or sold, while narrow-gauge locomotives and railcars owned by other parties have also operated on the D&SNG during visits and special events.

== D&SNG engines ==
As of October 2025, the Durango and Silverton Narrow Gauge Railroad appears to operate nineteen locomotives, eight converted oil-fired steam locomotives and nine diesel locomotives. The current roster goes as follows:

Locomotive details
Number	Image	Type	Wheel arrangement	Classification	Builder	Built	Serial number	Former	Status	At Durango	Notes
42		Steam	2-8-0	C-17	Baldwin Locomotive Works	1887	8626	Denver and Rio Grande Railroad, Rio Grande Southern Railroad	Display	Since 1983	The locomotive was built for the D&RG in 1887, and sold to the Rio Grande Southern Railroad in 1916, which renumbered it as their No. 42. It has been restored to as it appeared in the 20th-century (compare photo with original line drawing of this class of engine on left). On display at the D&SNG Museum.
473		Steam	2-8-2	K-28	American Locomotive Company (ALCO)	1923	64984	Denver and Rio Grande Western Railroad	Operational	Since 1981	Converted from burning coal to burning oil. Returned to service May 2021.
476		Steam	2-8-2	K-28	American Locomotive Company (ALCO)	1923	64987	Denver and Rio Grande Western Railroad	Operational	Since 1981	Taken out of service in September 1999. Placed on display at the D&SNG Museum from 1999 to 2016. Restored back to operating condition in February 2018. Converted from burning coal to burning oil. Returned to service on May 25, 2022.
478		Steam	2-8-2	K-28	American Locomotive Company (ALCO)	1923	64989	Denver and Rio Grande Western Railroad	Undergoing Rebuild	Since 1981	Almost swapped to the Cumbres and Toltec Scenic Railroad (C&TSRR) in exchange for K-36 class No. 483 in 2015. Taken out of service in April 2016. In the process of a full overhaul and oil conversion that is planned for completion by late 2026.
480		Steam	2-8-2	K-36	Baldwin Locomotive Works	1925	58558	Denver and Rio Grande Western Railroad	Operational	Since 1981	Restored to operating condition in July 1985. Converted from burning coal to burning oil. Returned to service May 2021.
481		Steam	2-8-2	K-36	Baldwin Locomotive Works	1925	58559	Denver and Rio Grande Western Railroad	Operational	Since 1981	Became the first K-36 class to go to Silverton under its own power in August 1981. Was the last remaining operational coal burner on the D&SNG's active roster, taken out of service March 24, 2024. Being converted to oil.
482		Steam	2-8-2	K-36	Baldwin Locomotive Works	1925	58541	Denver and Rio Grande Western Railroad	Operational	Since 1991	Sold to the Cumbres and Toltec Scenic Railroad (C&TSRR) in 1970. Traded to the D&SNG in exchange for K-37 class No. 497 in October 1991. Restored to operating condition in May 1992. Converted from burning coal to burning oil. Returned to service on December 16, 2021.
486		Steam	2-8-2	K-36	Baldwin Locomotive Works	1925	58587	Denver and Rio Grande Western Railroad	Display	Since 1999	Sold to the Royal Gorge Park for display in December 1967. Traded to the D&SNG in exchange for K-37 class No. 499 in May 1999. Restored to operating condition in August 2000. Taken out of service in October 2019. Awaiting a future overhaul and conversion from burning coal to burning oil as of 2024. Tender converted to oil-burning setup in August 2022.
493		Steam	2-8-2	K-37	Baldwin Locomotive Works; Burnham Shops	1928	20550	Denver and Rio Grande Western Railroad	Operational	Since 1981	Placed on display in Silverton until being moved to Durango on May 4, 2016, for restoration. Restored to operating condition on January 24, 2020. Converted from burning coal to burning oil during the restoration.
498		Steam	2-8-2	K-37	Baldwin Locomotive Works; Burnham Shops	1930	20640	Denver and Rio Grande Western Railroad	Stored	Since 1981	Stored in Durango, serving as a parts source for other locomotives. Tender was sent with K-37 class No. 499 when traded to the Royal Gorge Park in May 1999.
1		Diesel	(B-B)	50-Ton (Center-Cab)	General Electric (GE)	1957	Unknown	Arkansas Limestone Railroad	Operational	Since 2002	Nicknamed the "Hotshot". Used as the Durango shop switcher.
5		Diesel	(B-B)	45-Ton (Center-Cab)	General Electric (GE)	1960	33857	Algoma Steel Railroad	Stored	Since 2002	Abandoned on a standard gauge flatbed behind the Durango roundhouse.
11		Diesel	(B-B)	98-Ton (Center-Cab)	U.S. Steel; General Electric (GE)	Unknown	Unknown	Unknown	Operational	Since 2006	Nicknamed the "PB". Built using General Electric parts.
101		Diesel	(C-C)	DL-535E	Montreal Locomotive Works	1969	6023-01	White Pass and Yukon Route	Operational	Since 2020	Recently acquired from the White Pass and Yukon Route (WP&Y) in April 2020. Arrived in Durango in late September 2020.
103		Diesel	(C-C)	DL-535E	Montreal Locomotive Works	1969	6023-03	White Pass and Yukon Route	Operational	Since 2021	Recently acquired from the White Pass and Yukon Route in May 2021. Arrived in Durango in September 2021.
106		Diesel	(C-C)	DL-535E	Montreal Locomotive Works	1969	6023-06	White Pass and Yukon Route	Operational	Since 2021	Recently acquired from the White Pass and Yukon Route in May 2021. Arrived in Durango in September 2021.
107		Diesel	(C-C)	DL-535E	Montreal Locomotive Works	1969	6023-07	White Pass and Yukon Route	Operational	Since 2020	Recently acquired from the White Pass and Yukon Route (WP&Y) in April 2020. Arrived in Durango in late August 2020.
1201	–	Diesel	(B-B)	MP2000NG	Motive Power and Equipment Solutions, Inc.	2018–2020	Unknown	Tri-Rail	Stored	Since 2020	Acquired from Motive Power and Equipment Solutions (MP&ES) in 2018 in response to the 416 Fire. Arrived in Durango in early November 2020. Rebuilt from an ex-Tri-Rail F40PHL-2. Stored in the Durango yard.
1202	–	Diesel	(B-B)	MP2000NG	Motive Power and Equipment Solutions, Inc.	2018–2020	Unknown	Tri-Rail	Stored	Since 2020	Acquired from Motive Power and Equipment Solutions (MP&ES) in 2018 in response to the 416 Fire. Arrived in Durango in late October 2020. Rebuilt from an ex-Tri-Rail F40PHL-2. Stored in the Durango yard.

=== Former/retired locomotives ===
Locomotive details
Number	Image	Type	Wheel arrangement	Classification	Builder	Built	Serial number	Former	Status	At Durango	Notes
497		Steam	2-8-2	K-37	Baldwin Locomotive Works; Burnham Shops	1930	20521	Denver and Rio Grande Western Railroad	Stored	1981–1991	Restored to operating condition in 1984. Traded to the Cumbres and Toltec Scenic Railroad (C&TSRR) in exchange for K-36 class No. 482 in October 1991.
499		Steam	2-8-2	K-37	Baldwin Locomotive Works; Burnham Shops	1930	20753	Denver and Rio Grande Western Railroad	Display	1981–1999	Placed on display in Durango until being traded to the Royal Gorge Park in exchange for K-36 class No. 486 in May 1999.
2		Diesel	(B-B)	45-Ton (Center-Cab)	General Electric (GE)	1951	30857	Algoma Steel Railroad	Operational	2002–2006	Previously nicknamed the "PB-II". Sold to the Yosemite Mountain Sugar Pine Railroad in May 2006. Now operates as YMSPRR No. 402.
4		Diesel	(B-B)	55-Ton (Center-Cab)	General Electric (GE)	1955	32471	Algoma Steel Railroad	Operational	2002–2004	Sold to the Colorado Railroad Museum in 2004. Now operates as Golden City & San Juan No. 4.
7		Diesel	(B-B)	87-Ton (Center-Cab)	General Electric (GE)	1975	39003	Algoma Steel Railroad	Operational	2002–2021	Nicknamed the "Big Al". Sold to the Colorado Railroad Museum in December 2021 and later moved there on April 20, 2022.
9	–	Diesel	(B-B)	92-Ton (Center-Cab)	General Electric (GE)	Unknown	Unknown	Unknown	Operational	2006–2017	Traded to the Georgetown Loop Railroad in exchange for Porter DE75CT type No. 1203 in March 2017.
1203		Diesel	(C-C)	DE75CT	H.K. Porter, Inc.	1946	8096	U.S. Gypsum, Sumpter Valley Railway, Georgetown Loop Railroad	Operational	2017–2025	Acquired from the Georgetown Loop Railroad in March 2017 in trade for GE 92-ton center cab diesel No. 9. Sold to East Broad Top Railroad in February 2025.

=== Steam ===
==== Technical information ====
The steam-powered locomotives used today on the Durango and Silverton Narrow Gauge Railroad were built during the 1920s. There are three classes, K-28, K-36 and K-37, which are all based on wheel arrangement and pulling power of the locomotive. As of 2023, of the nine steam locomotives currently owned by the D&SNG, Nos. 473, 476, 480, 481, 482 and 493 are all operational.

The K represents the nickname "Mikado" that describes a locomotive with two non-powered, pivoting wheels in front of eight driving wheels, which are connected to driving rods powered by the engine's pistons and finally two non-powered trailer wheels located under the cab. The name comes from the fact that the first significant use of the type was a series of 20 built by Baldwin Locomotive Works for the Japanese Nippon Railway in 1897.

The numbers 28 and 36 designate the tractive effort (pulling force) of the locomotives in thousands of pounds. The tractive effort of K-28s is rated at 27,500 pounds-force (122.326 kN) and the tractive effort of a K-36 is a 36,200 pounds-force (161.026 kN). The weight of a K-28 with a full tender is 254,500 pounds (115,439 kg) and a K-36 weighs 286,600 pounds (130,000 kg) with a full tender.

==== 470 series ====
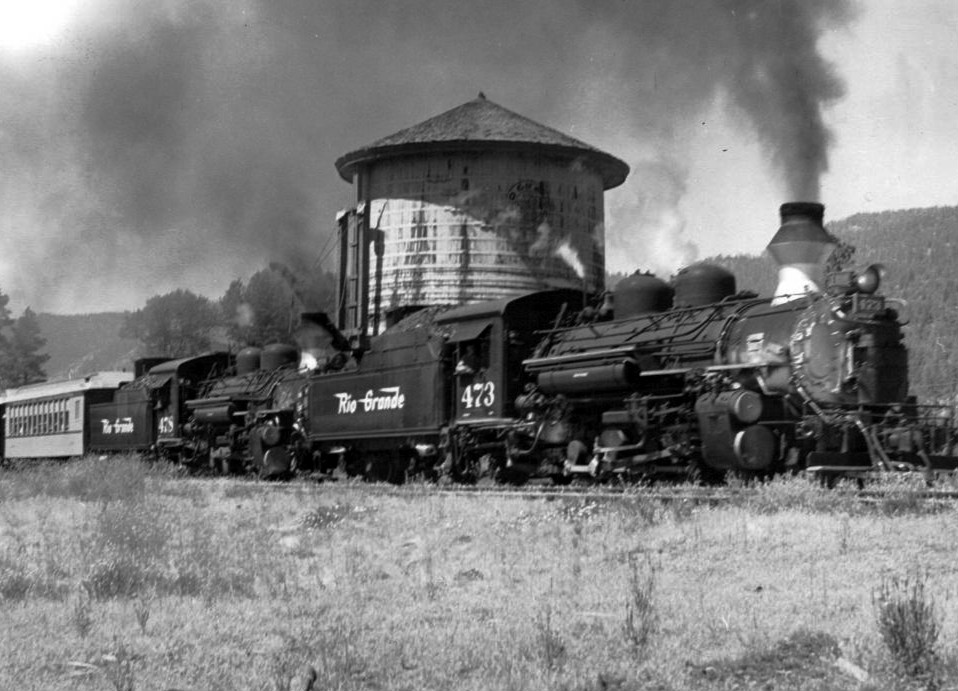
K-28 steam locomotive Nos. 473 and 478 at Hermosa on a D&RGW excursion in 1963

The 470 series, or "K-28" class 2-8-2 "Mikado" type locomotives, were ten engines designed for freight service along the D&RG. They were built by the Schenectady Locomotive Works of the American Locomotive Company (ALCO) in Schenectady, New York in 1923. The K-28s have 27,500 lbf (122.326 kN). of tractive effort, superheated, and the boilers are fed by two non-lifting injectors.

Air brakes are 6-ET automatic and also feature a straight air secondary braking system for daily passenger trains. Due to their smaller size, these engines are often used on the D&SNG for shorter trains, usually the first or last on the schedule, and often for helper service or sectioned trains. Despite being smaller than the K-36 class locomotives, older and less powerful, the engine crews tend to favor a trip on these engines because the design ALCO used was superior in balance and servicing. Firing can be tricky when the engine is working hard, as the clam shell-style firedoors tend to pull into the backhead of the boiler due to the draft, and if any flues in the boiler are leaking, the loss of draft on the fire is much harder to work around than on the K-36 locomotives. Firing while the engine is working hard is done with a large "heel" pattern, generally with as little coal on the flue sheet as possible, and gradually sloping the fire bed towards the door sheet to the height or higher than the firedoors. This results in the draft being forced through the fire bed in the thinner areas towards the flue sheet, which usually is hindered by the lack of draft between the grates and the arch brick. New firemen sometimes have a hard time learning this, because the art of "reading" a fire takes time to learn and the amount of time working on the K-28 class locomotives is much-reduced compared to the railroad's usual K-36 workhorses, which have a larger firebox and are more forgiving in technique.

Out of the original ten only three 470s remain, and all are owned and operated by the D&SNG. The other seven were requisitioned by the United States Army in 1942 to be used on the White Pass & Yukon Route in Alaska during World War II. They were later dismantled for scrap in 1946.

Locomotives 473, 476 and 478 operated on many parts of the D&RGW. Engine 473 served frequently on the Chili Line that operated between Antonito, Colorado and Santa Fe, New Mexico, until the line was abandoned in 1941. 476 and 478 saw an extensive service on the San Juan passenger train, which ran between Durango, Colorado and Alamosa, Colorado until 1951. 473, 476 and 478 operated on the Silverton Branch from the 1950s through 1980 and are still in service today.

In July 2015, the D&SNG and C&TSRR had announced an engine-trade proposal by which locomotive 478 would go to Chama, New Mexico, and, in exchange, the D&SNG would get K-36 class No. 483, which had not seen operation in several years. Since the swap failed to go through, the D&SNG announced in June 2016 that it was going to restore locomotive 476 to operating condition and place locomotive 478 in the museum where locomotive 476 previously sat in.

1. No. 473 has been converted to an oil burner and is operational.
2. No. 476 has been converted to an oil burner and is operational.
3. No. 478 is in the shop undergoing an overhaul and oil conversion.

==== 480 series ====
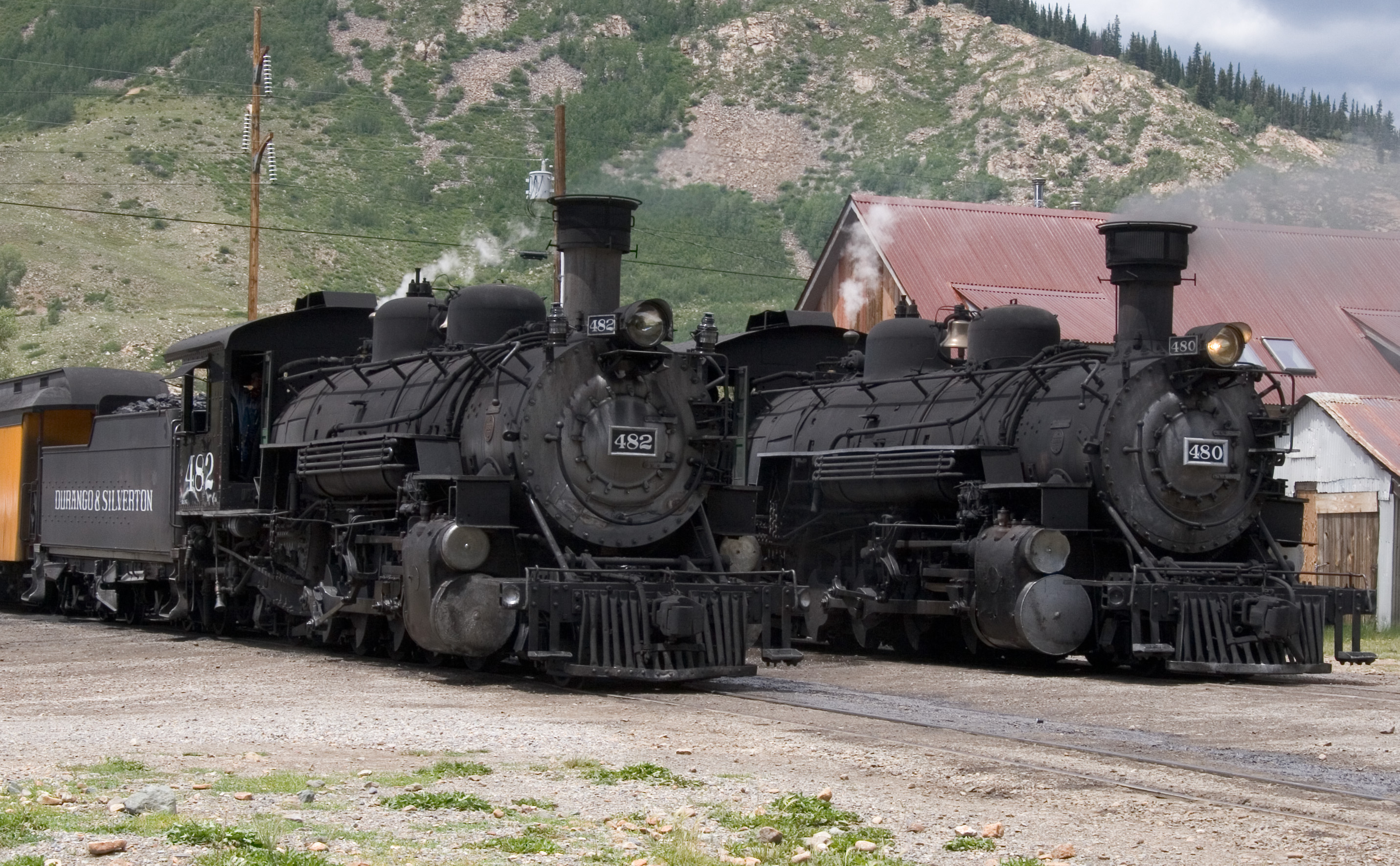
K-36 steam locomotives Nos. 482 and 480 in Silverton

The 480 series, or "K-36" class 2-8-2 "Mikado" type locomotives, were ten engines designed for the D&RGW. They were built by the Baldwin Locomotive Works in 1925. The 480s were the last ten narrow-gauge locomotives constructed for the D&RGW. The 480s were used for freight-hauling throughout the D&RGW 3 ft (914 mm) narrow-gauge network. The "36" stands for 36,200 lbf (161.026 kN). of tractive effort. These engines are outside- frame Mikados, and all drive wheels have counterbalancing outside of the frame, resulting in the utilitarian look the engines are known for.

The engines currently use 6-ET automatic air and the secondary straight air used on regular service equipment. The railroad runs 12-car passenger trains behind these engines; however more cars require the train to be double-headed. Despite popular belief that the railroad does not doublehead trains out of Durango because of smoke, the real reason is the weight restriction on the bridge at 15th Street, not allowing more than one K-36 at a time (K-28 class engines, however, are still doubleheaded from Durango). The engines were delivered with Master Mechanics-design smokeboxes for draft; however at some point the D&RGW converted them to Andersson (cyclone) front ends. Water is fed to the boiler by two non-lifting injectors. The 40-square-foot (3.7 m^{2}) grate surface in the firebox is among the largest built for a narrow-gauge locomotive and is fed by hand-firing. Firing is simpler on these engines compared to the K-28s; however, the larger surface area requires more fuel. A typical trip uses around 3–5 short tons (2.68–4.46 long tons; 2.72–4.54 t) on the way up to Silverton and another 1–2 short tons (0.89–1.79 long tons; 0.91–1.81 t) on the return to Durango. Ergonomically, the engines are less comfortable than the others as well, with the crew seats being farther back from the backhead and the engineer having to lean forward constantly to adjust the throttle and use the sanders. The running gear on the locomotives also tend to wear out faster than the ALCO-designed K-28s, and the resulting pounding and rough ride can take a toll on the engine crew.

The D&SNG owns four K-36s: Nos. 480, 481, 482 and 486, all of which are operational. The Cumbres and Toltec Scenic Railroad (C&TSRR) owns Nos. 483, 484, 487, 488 and 489. Locomotive No. 485, unfortunately, fell into the turntable pit in Salida, Colorado, in 1955. It was scrapped for parts thereafter; however, some accessories, running and valve gear were salvaged and used on other locomotives.

1. No. 480 has been converted to an oil burner and is operational.
2. No. 481 is undergoing an overhaul and conversion to oil
3. No. 482 has been converted to an oil burner and is operational.
4. No. 486 is placed on display in the D&SNG Museum awaiting a full overhaul and conversion to an oil burner.

==== 490 series ====
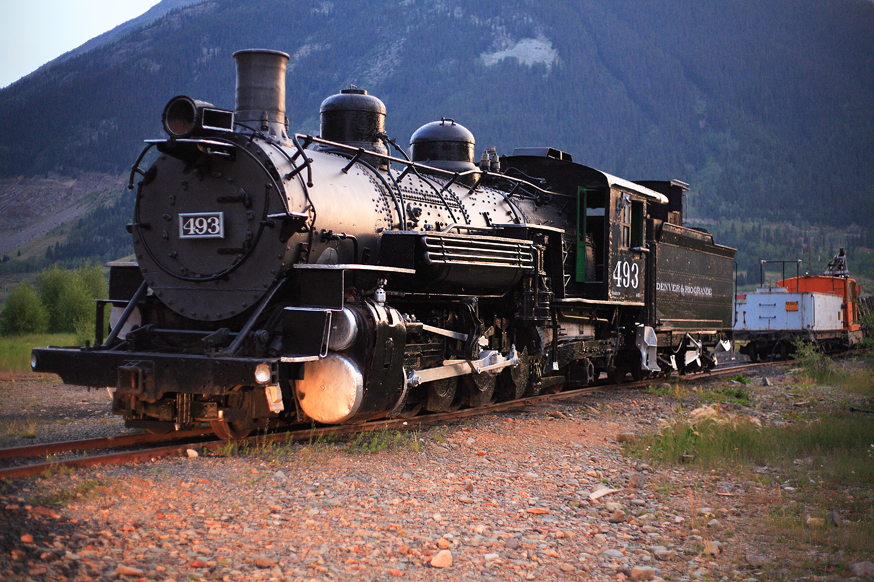
K-37 steam locomotive No. 493 at the Silverton Yard

The 490 series, or "K-37" class 2-8-2 "Mikado" type locomotives, were part of a class of thirty standard-gauge class 190 (later, class C-41) 2-8-0 "Consolidation-" type engines built in 1902 for the D&RG by Baldwin Locomotive Works. In 1928 and 1930, ten of the C-41s boilers were used to build the Rio Grande's K-37 class of steam locomotive.

At first the D&SNG operated only one K-37: #497, which was rebuilt in 1984 and operated for seven years, being the first K-37 to go to Silverton, and under its own power.

It was later determined that the trailing truck was having trouble negotiating the curves in the Animas Canyon. For this reason, the D&SNG traded #497 to the C&TSRR in exchange for K-36 class#482. This trade was mutually beneficial for both railroads as it gave the C&TSRR a fully operational locomotive, giving in exchange a locomotive that had never run and likely would never operate under C&TSRR ownership.

Numbers 493 and 498 are owned by the D&SNG, but #498 is not operational and serving as a parts source. Number 499 was also owned by the D&SNG at one time, lacking a tender and was on display in the museum. #499 was later traded for K-36 class No. 486 at Royal Gorge Park, including the tender from #498.

No. 493 was shifted around a few times on the railroad on display a few times, last ending up in the Silverton yard until May 4, 2016, when #493 was hauled to Durango from Silverton by K-36 #481. #493 was originally supposed to be transported to the Colorado Railroad Museum in Golden, Colorado, on a 10-year lease, where it would be restored to operating condition and run it for those 10 years; then returned to the D&SNG. However, plans were cancelled and #493 sat outside the Durango roundhouse with an uncertain future for some time until early 2018, when she was put in the roundhouse for restoration. In response to the 416 fire, the D&SNG announced their plans to restore #493 publicly and that the locomotive was their first candidate for an oil conversion, with more to come in the future. #493 ran under its own power for the first time on January 24, 2020, and has been the D&SNG's primary piece of motive power throughout 2020 and 2021.

1. No. 493 has been converted to an oil burner and is operational.
2. No. 497 was traded to the C&TSRR in October 1991 and is awaiting an overhaul in the Chama roundhouse.
3. No. 498 is stored partially disassembled in Durango.
4. No. 499 was traded to the Royal Gorge Park in May 1999 and is placed on display.

=== Diesel engines ===
Diesels were first introduced to the Durango Yard in the 1960s with diesel locomotive #50. Today, #50 is now on display at the Colorado Railroad Museum in Golden, Colorado. The United States Transportation Corps. also had a six-axle narrow-gauge diesel locomotive (#3000) for trial use in Durango in the 1950s, which saw limited use.

1. Diesel engine #1, nicknamed the "Hotshot", is a 50-ton center-cab diesel built by General Electric in 1957. It was acquired from the Arkansas Limestone Railroad. During the 2002 Missionary Ridge Fire, the D&SNG voluntarily shut-down steam service. To help continue service, Hotshot pulled coaches out along the highline from Rockwood, Colorado. It is currently stationed in Durango.
2. Diesel engine #2, nicknamed the "P.B. II", is a 45-ton center-cab diesel built by General Electric in February 1951 and was originally Algoma Steel #1, from Sault Ste. Marie, Ontario. It was later sold to the Yosemite Mountain Sugar Pine Railroad in May 2006. It is currently in service on the YMSPRR as their #402.
3. Diesel engine #4 is a 55-ton center-cab diesel built by General Electric in August 1955 and was originally Algoma Steel #4, from Sault Ste. Marie, Ontario. It was later sold to the Colorado Railroad Museum in 2004. It is currently in service at the C.R.R.M. as Golden City & San Juan #4.
4. Diesel engine #5 is a 45-ton center-cab diesel built by General Electric in May 1960 and was originally Algoma Steel #5, Sault Ste. Marie, Ontario. It currently remains stored partially disassembled in Durango.
5. Diesel engine #7, nicknamed the "Big Al", is an 87-ton center-cab diesel built by General Electric in August 1975 and was originally Algoma Steel #7, from Sault Ste. Marie, Ontario. Big Al is named after the current owner of the D&SNG, Allen C. Harper. It was later sold to the Colorado Railroad Museum in December 2021 and eventually moved there on April 20, 2022. It is currently in service at the C.R.R.M.
6. Diesel engine #9 was first acquired by the D&SNG in March 2006 and is a 92-ton center-cab diesel built by General Electric (exact date unknown). #9 was later traded to the Georgetown Loop Railroad in March 2017 in exchange for its Porter type DE75CT diesel engine #1203. It is currently in service on the GLRY.
7. Diesel engine #11, nicknamed the "P.B.", was built by U.S. Steel with GE parts (exact date unknown). It was acquired in March 2006 and is a 98-ton center-cab diesel.
8. Diesel engine #101 is one of four former White Pass & Yukon Route type DL-535E diesels acquired in April 2020. It was built by the Montreal Locomotive Works in May 1969. It arrived at the D&SNG in late September 2020.
9. Diesel engine #103 is one of four former White Pass & Yukon Route type DL-535E diesels acquired in April 2020. It was built by the Montreal Locomotive Works in May 1969. It arrived at the D&SNG in late September 2021.
10. Diesel engine #106 is one of four former White Pass & Yukon Route type DL-535E diesels acquired in April 2020. It was built by the Montreal Locomotive Works in May 1969. It arrived at the D&SNG in late September 2021.
11. Diesel engine #107 is one of four former White Pass & Yukon Route type DL-535E diesels acquired in April 2020. It was built by the Montreal Locomotive Works in May 1969. It arrived at the D&SNG in late August 2020.
12. Diesel engine #1201 is one of two custom-built type MP2000NG diesels acquired from Motive Power and Equipment Solutions in 2018, in response to the 416 Fire near Durango. It was built between 2018 and 2020, rebuilt from an ex-Tri-Rail F40PHL-2 and was originally announced to have the number 550, which is the number that was chosen in reference to the highway linking Durango and Silverton. It arrived at the D&SNG in early November 2020. It is currently stored in Durango awaiting to be put into service.
13. Diesel engine #1202 is one of two custom-built type MP2000NG diesels acquired from Motive Power and Equipment Solutions in 2018 in response to the 416 Fire near Durango. It was built between 2018 and 2020, rebuilt from an ex-Tri-Rail F40PHL-2, and was originally announced to have the number 416, which is the number that was chosen in recognition of the extraordinary effort that was undertaken by firefighters to fight the fire. It arrived at the D&SNG in late October 2020. It is currently stored in Durango awaiting to be put into service.
14. Diesel engine #1203 is a type DE75CT diesel built by H.K. Porter in January 1946, originally for U.S. Gypsum. It was acquired in March 2017 from the Georgetown Loop Railroad in trade for GE 92-ton center-cab diesel engine #9.
- RB-1 (railbus) was built in the winter of 1987–1988. It was originally numbered 1001 and was named Tamarron. It could seat 32 people, had its own baggage compartment, had its own restroom and had a 300-horsepower (220 kW) six-cylinder Caterpillar diesel engine. This unit was intended for use on the Animas River Railway; when that operation was shut-down, it was found being used as a switcher in the Durango yard. Years later, it was put into revenue service during the 2002 Missionary Ridge Fire. It has since been sold to a new owner.
- In April 2020, it was announced that four MLW type DL-535E diesels have been purchased from the White Pass & Yukon Route in Skagway, Alaska. The first two of those diesels (Nos. 101 and 107) were delivered between late August and late September 2020. The other two diesels (Nos. 103 and 106) were delivered in late September 2021. All four are now in service and operating.
Locomotives

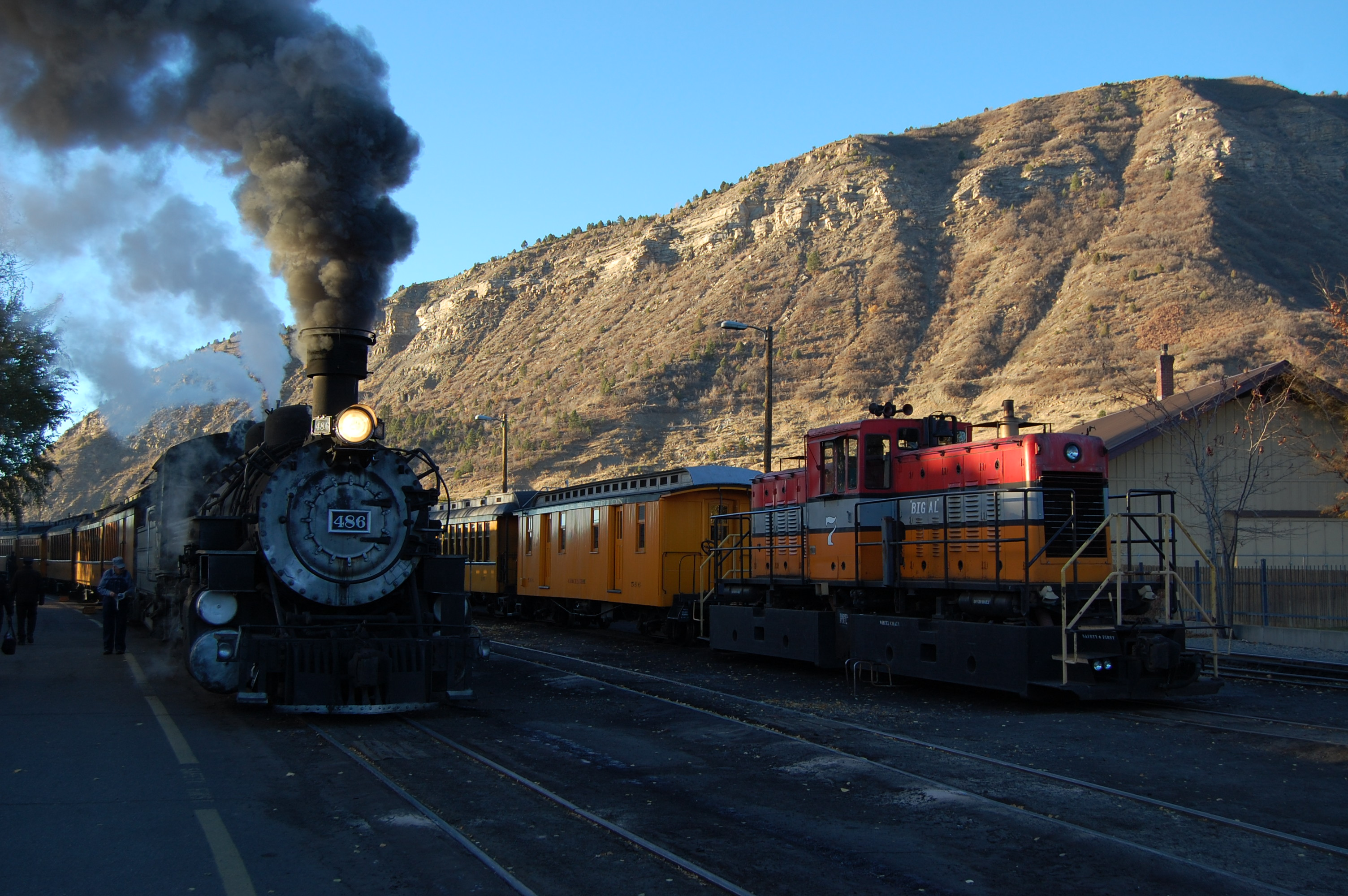
K-36 steam locomotive #486 and diesel engine "Big Al" #7 in Durango on October 25, 2012

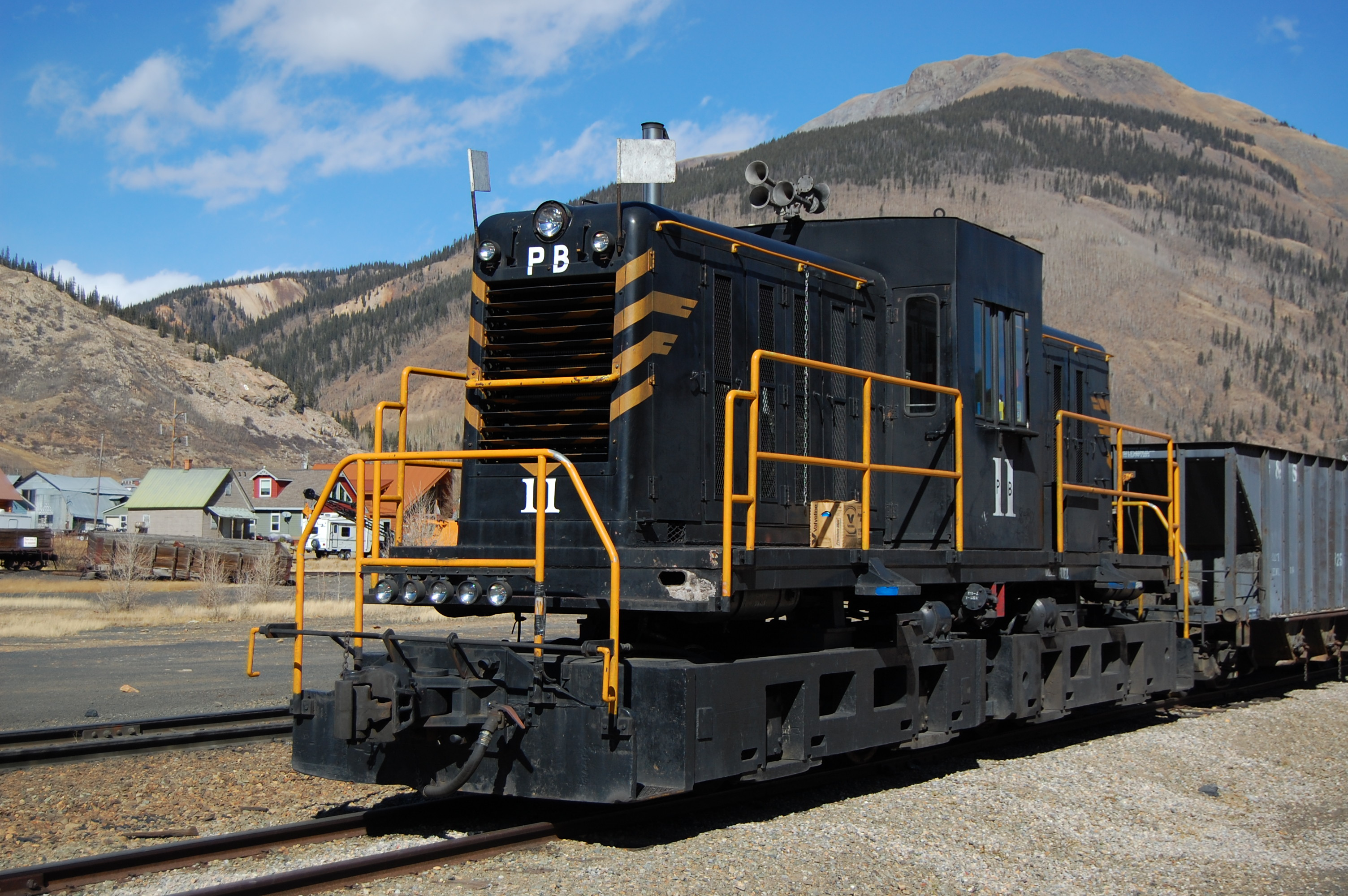
Diesel engine #11 in Silverton on October 25, 2012
Trains

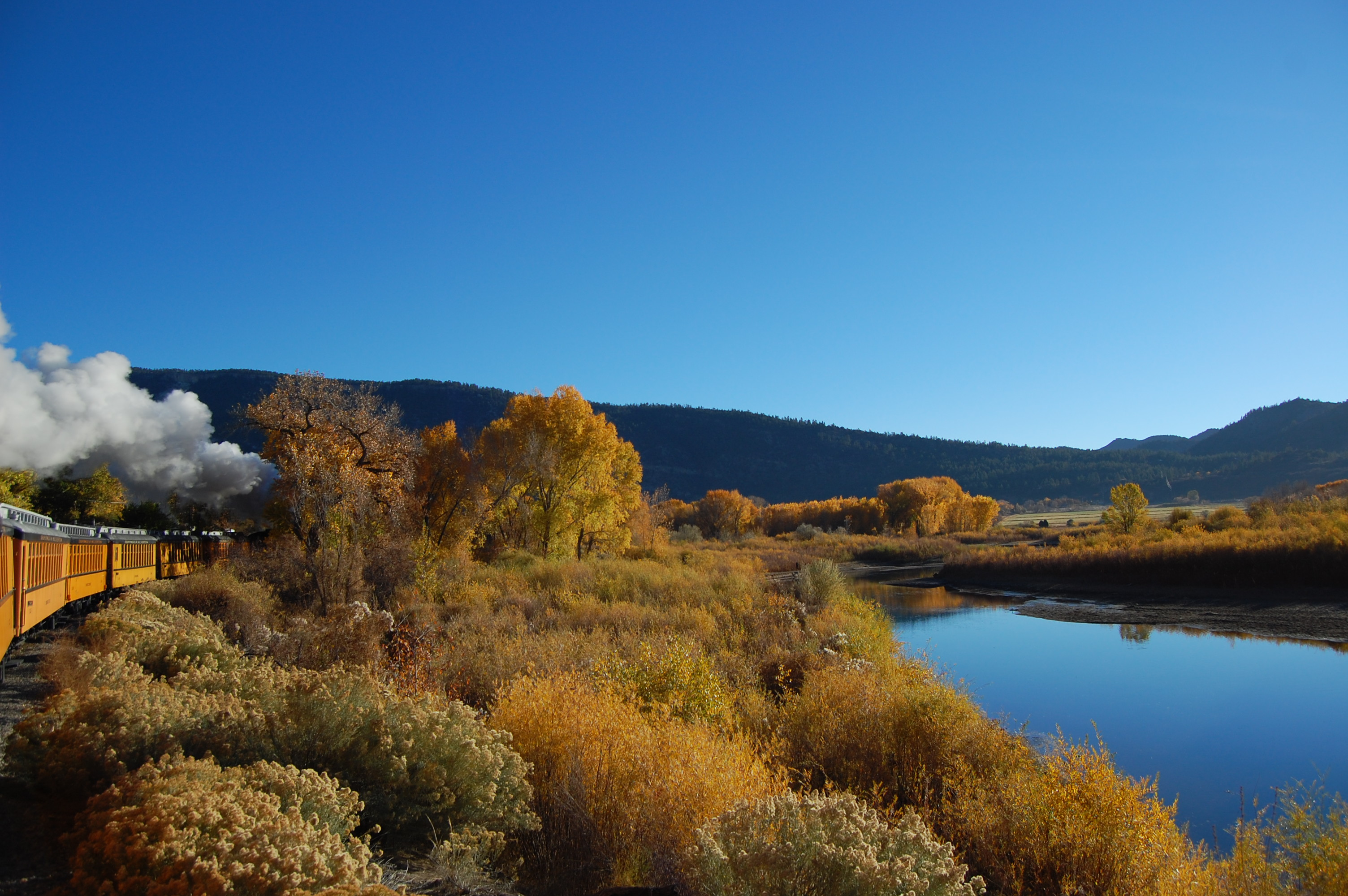
On the way to Silverton on October 25, 2012

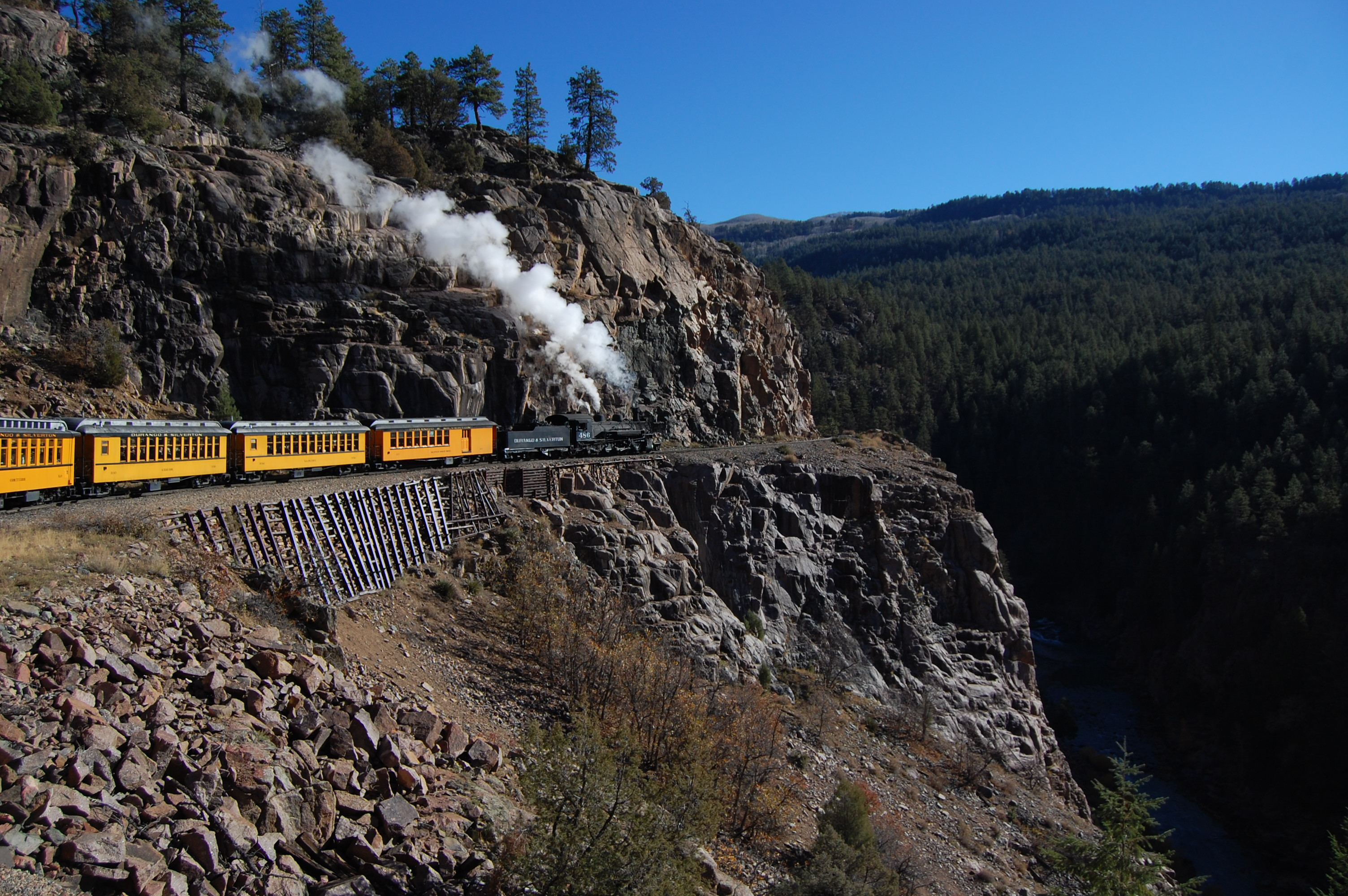
On the Highline above the Animas Canyon on October 25, 2012

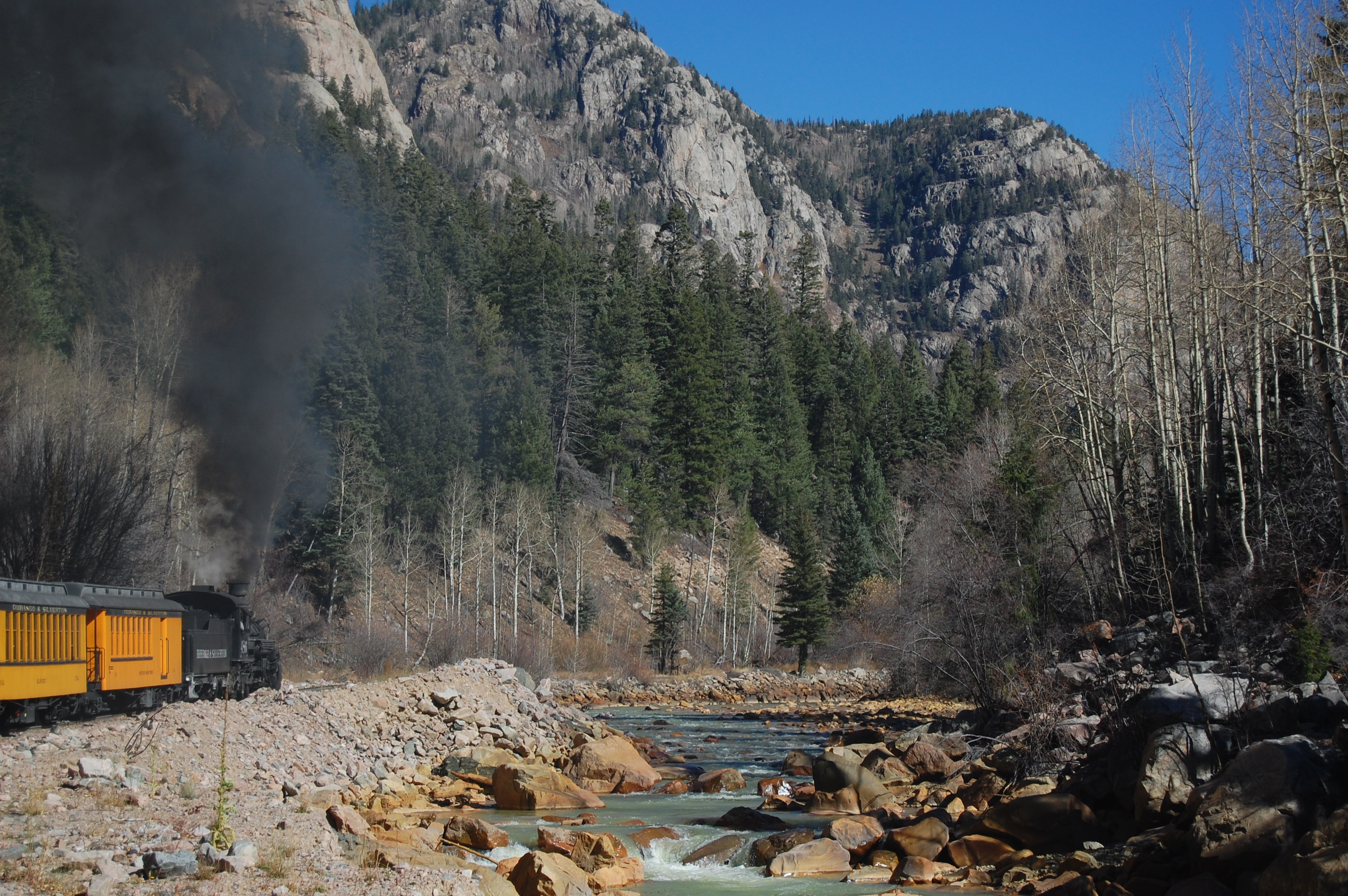
Along the Animas River to Silverton on October 25, 2012

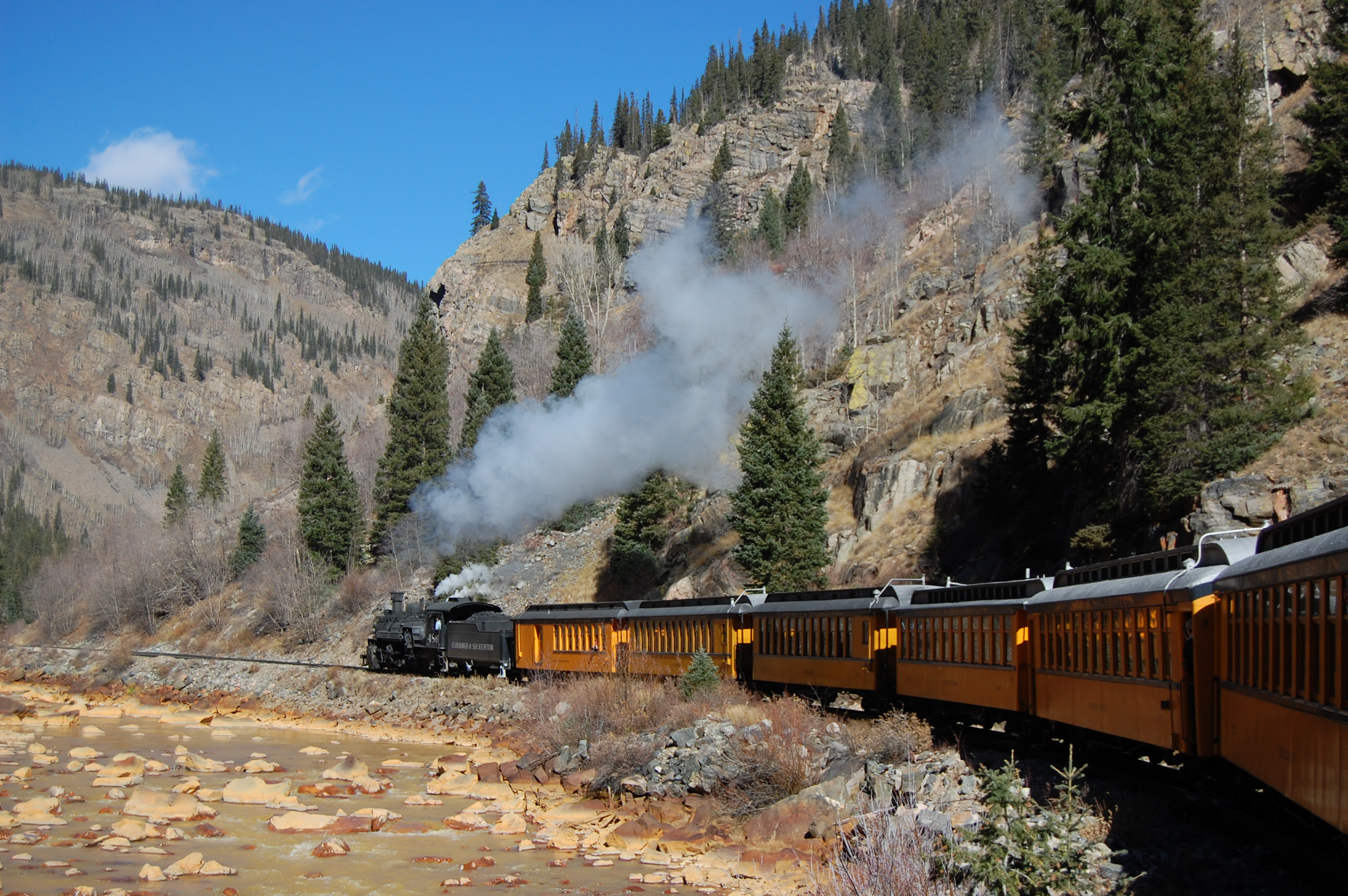
Approaching Silverton on October 25, 2012

== D&SNG rolling stock ==
The Durango and Silverton Narrow Gauge Railroad currently operates over 50 pieces of rolling stock. Some of the cars are the oldest passenger cars in existence.

=== Concession cars ===
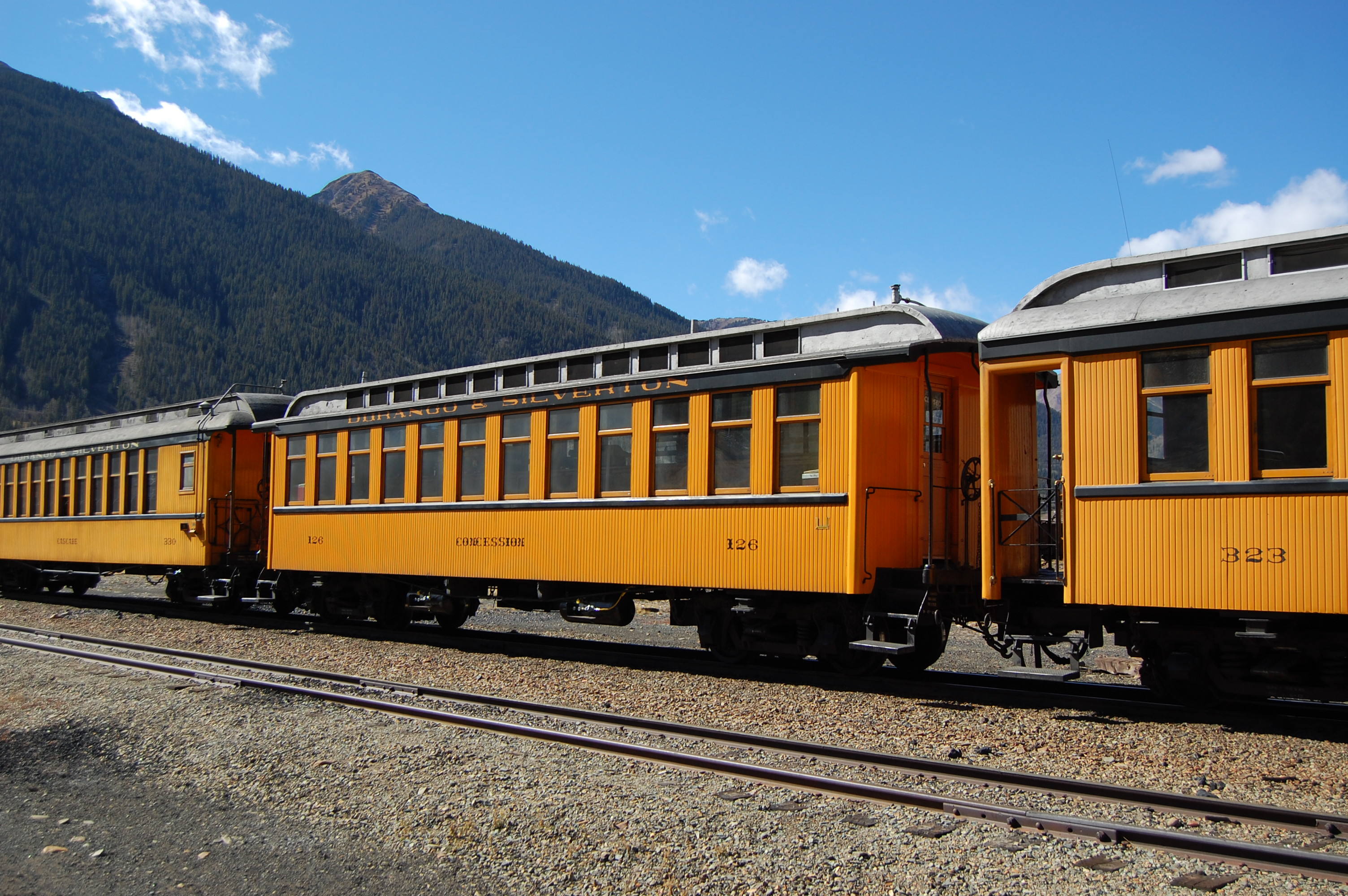
Concession car 126 in Silverton, October 2012

Like most of the coaches on the D&SNG, the concession cars are good examples of how coaches were renumbered and rebuilt several times by the D&RGW.

- Concession car 64 was originally D&RG mail-baggage 64 built in 1889. In 1983 it was purchased from the Black Hills Central Railroad. 64 returned to service in 1984 as a concession car.
- Concession car 126 was originally D&RG baggage car 27. It was renumbered 126 in 1886. It was converted to a coach-snack bar by the D&RGW in 1963 then reconverted in 1979 to a coach. It was reconverted to a full concession car by the D&SNG in 1982.
- Concession car 212 was originally D&RG coach 20 built in 1879. In 1887 it was rebuilt into a combination coach-baggage car and numbered 215. In 1942, 215 had been sold to a Mexican railway. Then the D&RGW realized that it was larger than another combination car 212. The numbers of the car were switched and the smaller car was sent to Mexico. In 1964 converted to a coach-snack bar by the D&RGW, then to a 48-passenger coach in 1979. In 1982 it was converted to a snack bar car by the D&SNG. Then, in 1986, it was converted to a full concession car.
- Concession car 566 was originally D&RG mail car 14 built in 1882. Around 1888 it was rebuilt into excursion car 566. In July 1904 it was renumbered 0566. Then it was switched to work service in 1914. It was rebuilt to its original appearance as a postal car by the D&SNG. It was then given its old excursion car number of 566 and is now used as a concession car.

=== Coaches ===
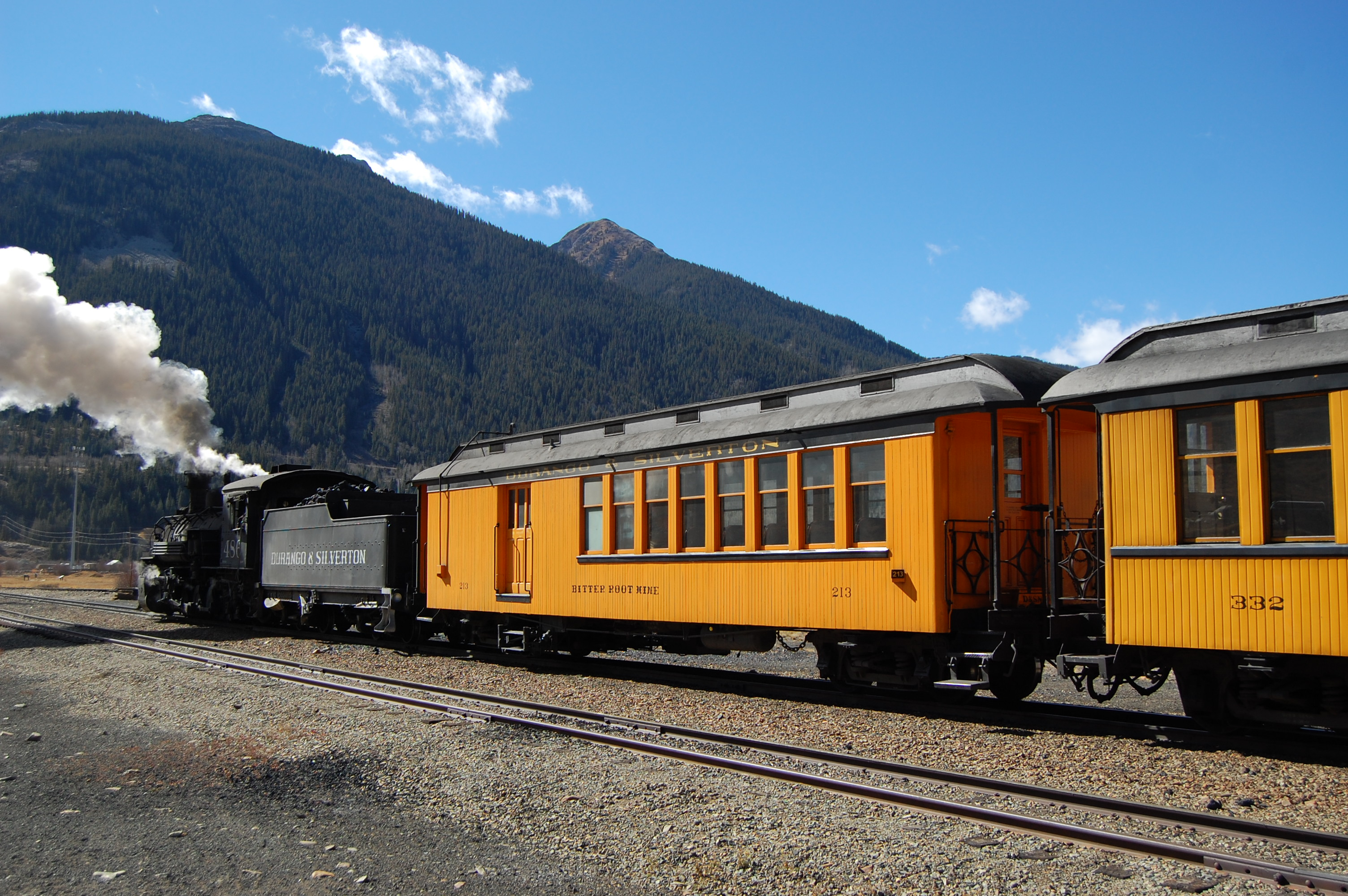
Bitter Root Mine 213 in Silverton, October 2012

The D&SNG operates one combination car 213 named Bitter Root Mine, it was previously named Home Ranch and was built in 1983 by the D&SNG. It has a hydraulic lift for passengers in wheelchairs.

The D&SNG operates several other coaches:

1. 257 Shenandoah, built in 1880, originally numbered 267 until sold to the RGS, later reacquired by the D&SNG
2. 291 King Mine, built in 1881
3. 311 McPhee, built in 1881
4. 319 Needleton, built in 1882
5. 323 Animas City, built in 1887
6. 327 Durango, built in 1887
7. 330 Cascade, built in 1963
8. 331 Trimble, built in 1963
9. 332 La Plata, built in 1964
10. 333 Tacoma, built in 1964
11. 334 Hermosa, built in 1964
12. 335 Elk Park, built in 1964
13. 336 Rockwood, built in 1964
14. 337 Fort Lewis, built in 1964
15. 503 Crazy Woman Creek, acquired in 2019. 503 was originally a flat car built in the 1940s, then converted for use as a coach in 1982 by the Cumbres and Toltec Scenic Railroad.
Museum exhibits

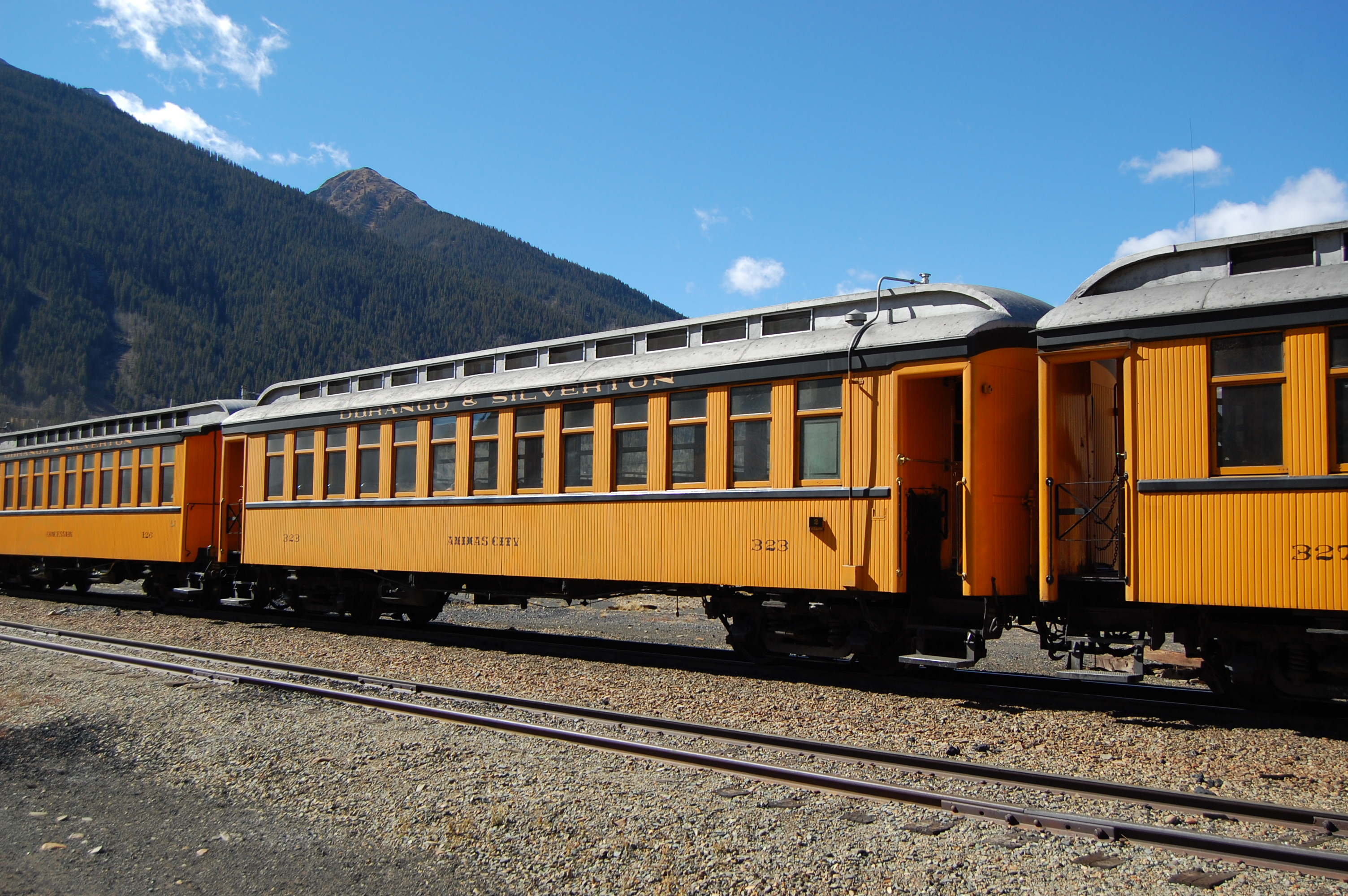
Animas City 323 in Silverton, October 2012

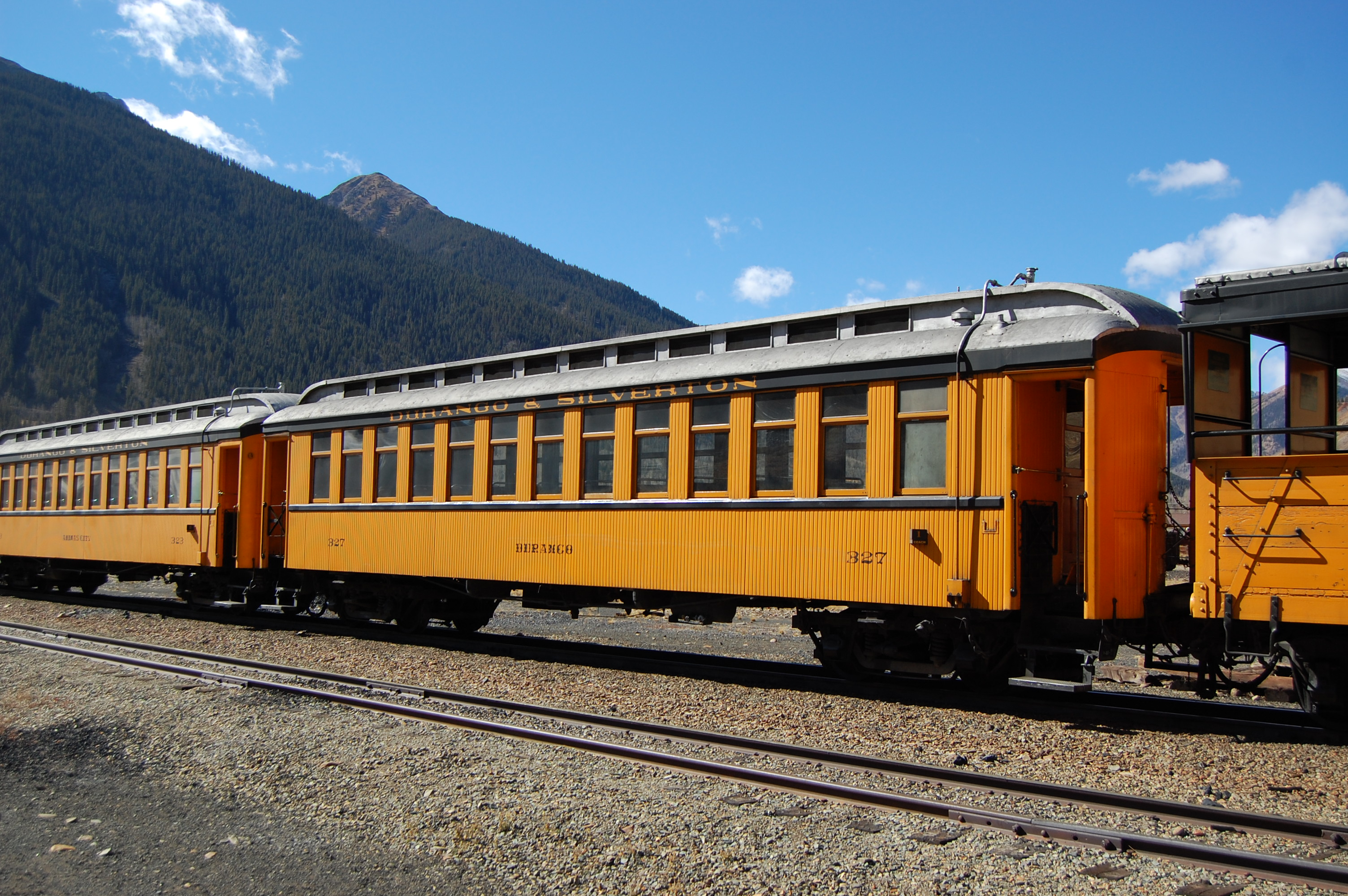
Durango 327 in Silverton, October 2012

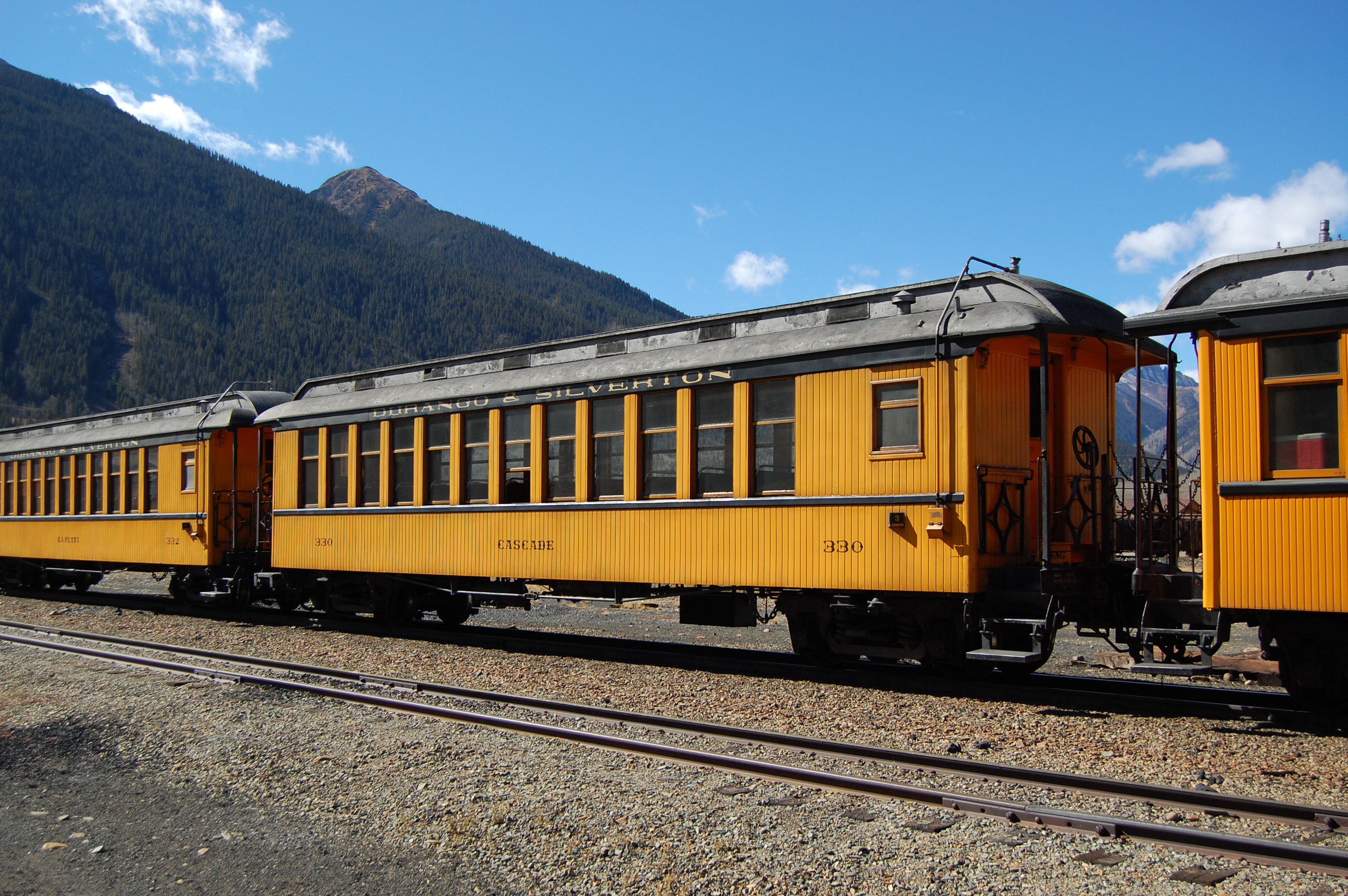
Cascade 330 in Silverton, October 2012

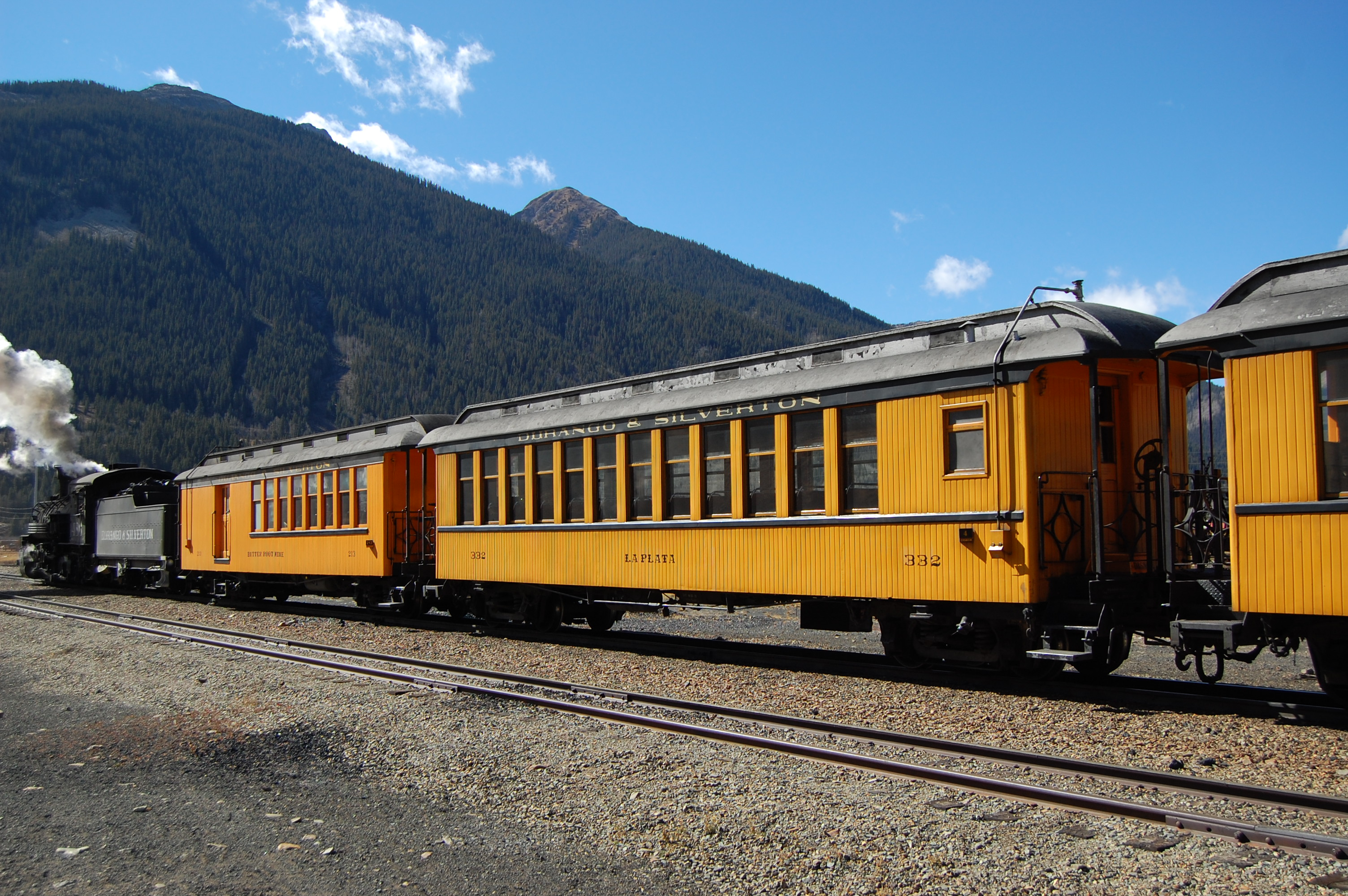
La Plata 332 in Silverton, October 2012

==== Cinco Animas B-2 ====
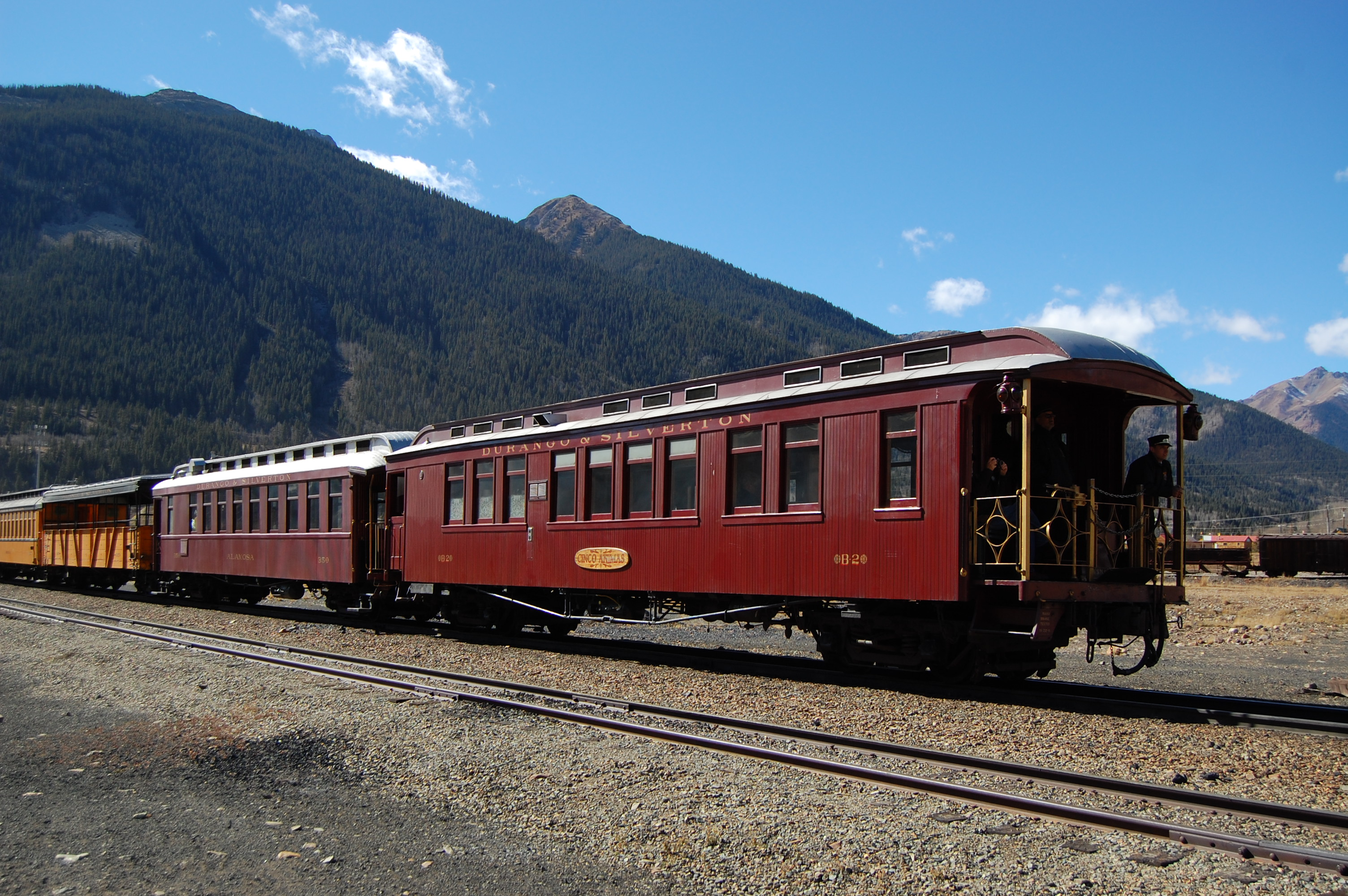
Cinco Animas B-2 in Silverton, October 2012. These cars are painted in their original red color, that was used on the Denver & Rio Grande RR and the Rio Grande Southern RR. The yellow color (seen on other equipment) was not used by the D&RG until the mid-20th century.

Built in 1883, the Cinco Animas was originally an immigrant sleeper. Immigrant sleepers had very few amenities and had little consideration for passenger comfort. The original Cinco Animas could seat up to thirty passengers. It was turned into a business car in 1913. In 1963 it was purchased by the Cinco Animas Corporation, where it received its present name. In 1982, the Cinco Animas was sold to the D&SNG. It runs daily throughout the summer.

==== Nomad B-3 ====
Built in 1878, the Nomad was originally named Fairplay. In 1886, it was rebuilt as Business Car N. It is reportedly the favorite car of D&RG president William Jackson Palmer. The Fairplay has hosted Presidents William H Taft, Ulysses S Grant and Theodore Roosevelt. While being owned by several parties between 1951 and 1982, the Fairplay was renamed the Nomad. It was acquired by the D&SNG in 1982. Today it is the oldest private railroad coach still in service in the United States. It's available to for private charters during the summer season.

==== General Palmer B-7 ====
The General Palmer was built in 1880 as a business car for the D&RG. In later years it fell into disrepair. It was restored in 2001 at a cost of $250,000 by the D&SNG. Its modern amenities include internet service and a twenty-inch flat paneled television. The General Palmer is exclusively used by owner Allen Harper, his family and guests.

==== San Juan 312 ====
Built by the D&RG in 1887, it had clerestory roof and bullnose ends. It was finished in ash and seated forty-six. It was rebuilt in 1937 at the Alamosa shops. Vestuable ends, train-line steam heat, electric lights, and deluxe Heywood-Wakefield reclining coach seats for 24 passenger were installed. The D&SNG named coach 312 the Silverton. In the winter of 2007–2008 it was rebuilt with overstuffed seating for in a wide three across arrangement and had its name changed to San Juan. It runs during the summer time.

==== Alamosa 350 ====
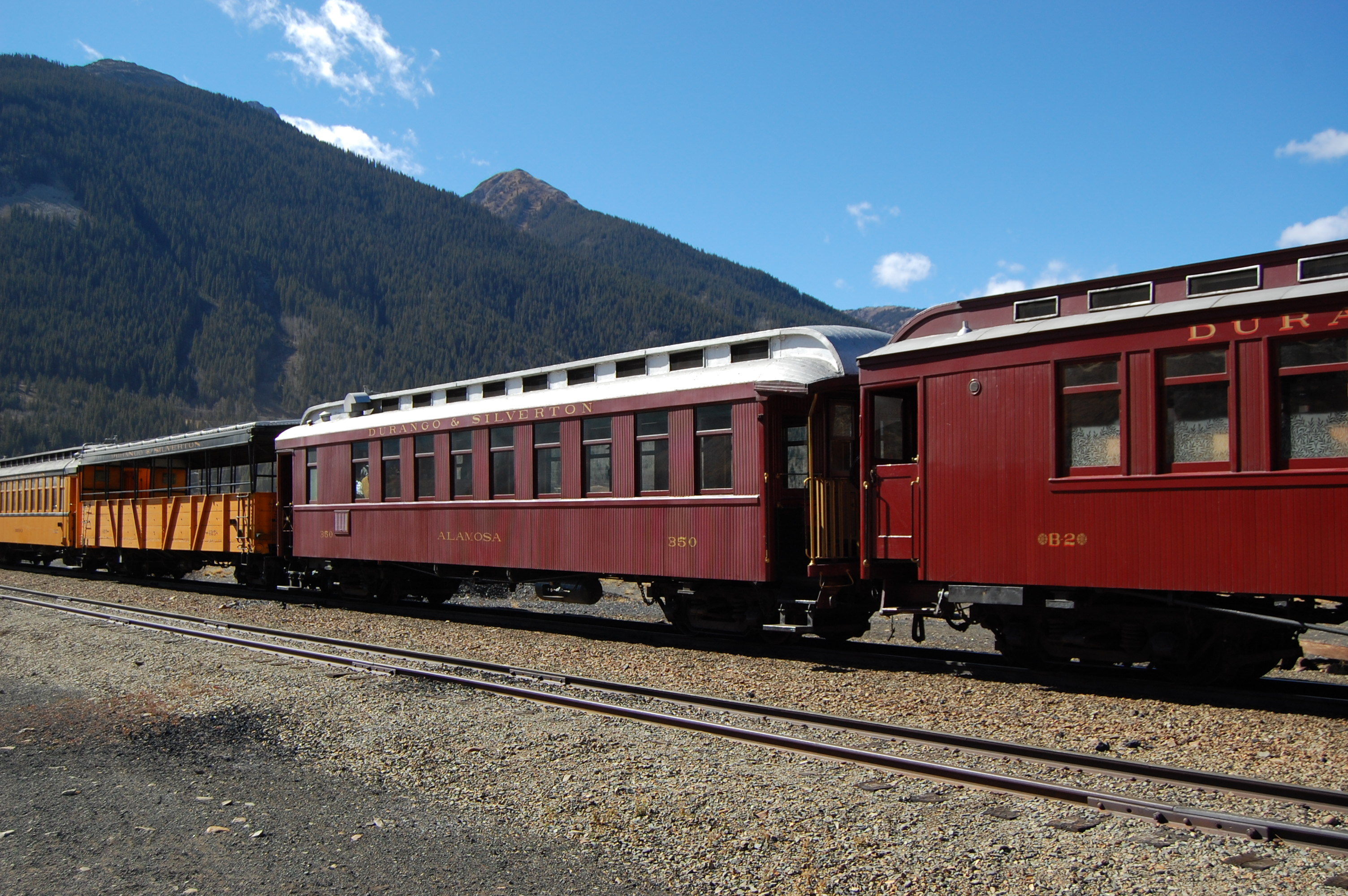
Alamosa 350 in Silverton, October 2012

Built in 1880, it was originally named the Hildago as Horton chair car number 25. It was changed to car 403 in 1885. It was then rebuilt into an office living car for members of the Valuation Survey in 1919. Valuation Survey was inventorying the entire railroad property after it was returned to the D&RGW after World War 1. In 1924 it was converted into a parlor-smoker car. After a rebuild in 1937 it became a parlor-buffet car named Alamosa. The car had a closed vestibule, with steam heat, electric lights and seats for fourteen passengers. In 1957 it was converted for coach service. It was renumbered 350 in 1959. In 1981 it was purchased by the D&SNG and converted to a parlor car and seats twenty-five people. There was another car with the same name that was destroyed in a derailment on the Rio Grande Southern Railroad. It runs daily throughout the summer.

==== Prospector 630 ====
Was built in 1984 as a coach and was named Hunt. In 2009 it became a family upscale coach. The Prospector features comfortable table and chair style seating. The ceiling of the Prospector features an enlarged route map, making it easy for passengers to follow the train's progress along the route.

==== Tall Timber Legend 631 & Tall Timber Legacy 632 ====
631 was built in 1985 and named the North Star. 632 was built in 1986 and named Teft. Both cars were built as general passenger cars to help with the increase in passengers. In 2009 the cars were converted with overstuffed seats. They are used mainly to take passengers to Tall Timber to go zip lining.

=== Open observation gondolas ===
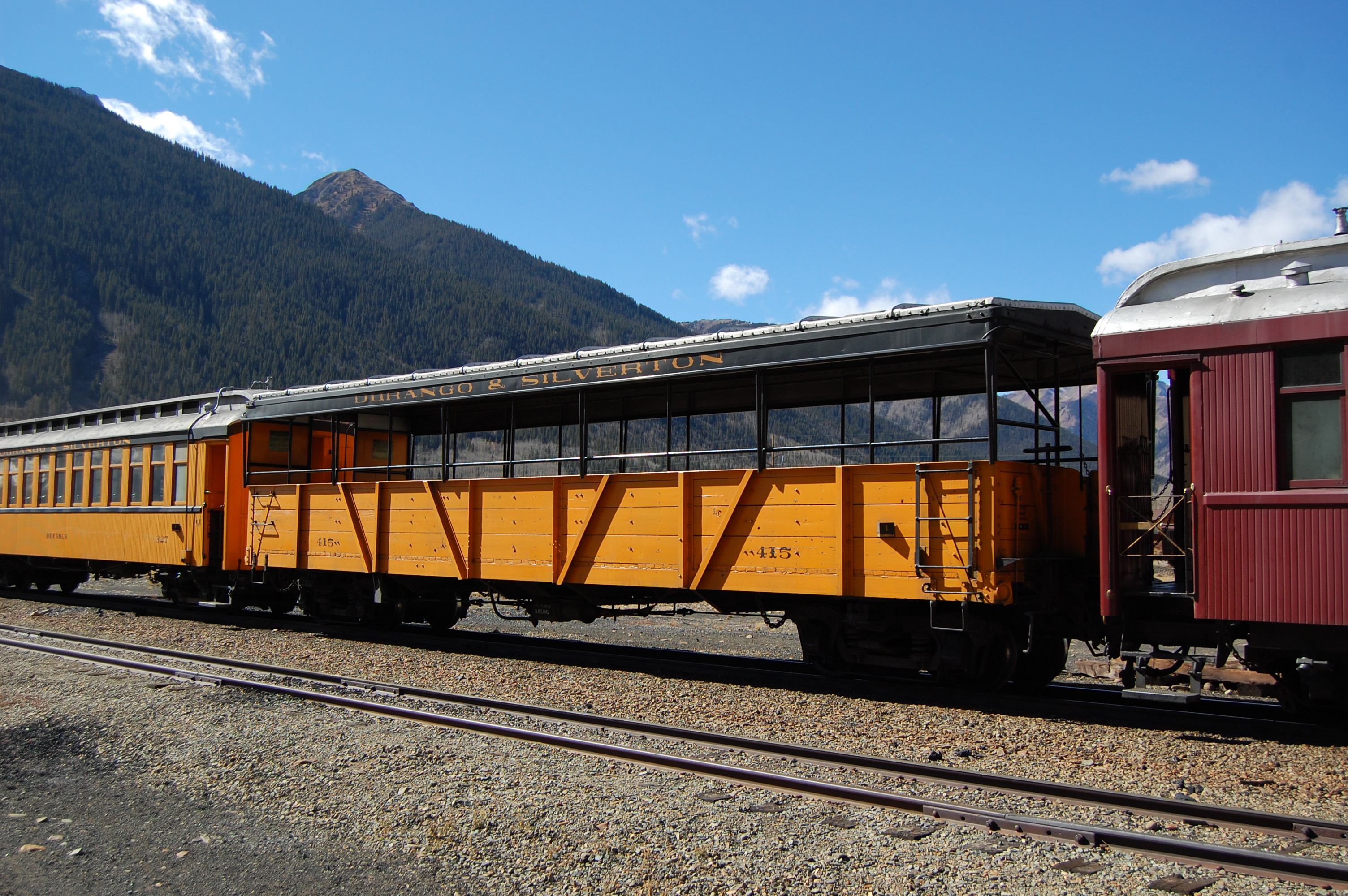
Open observation car#415 in Silverton, October 2012

Open observation gondolas 400–402 were built in 1963, equipped with passenger car trucks, steel roofs, tile floors and tramway seats. Gondolas 403–405 were built for the 1967 season on the Silverton. Between 1982 and 1985, the D&SNG built Open Observation cars 411 and 412. Open Observation cars 406–409 and 413–416 were built between 1982 and 1986.

- Cars 400–405 and 411–412 are former standard gauge boxcars, built in 1916.
- Cars 406–409 and 413–416 are former standard gauge stock cars, built in 1937.

==== Silver Vista 313 ====
The original Silver Vista was built in 1947 by the D&RGW. It was a popular glass-topped observation car and the only one of its kind. The original Silver Vista was destroyed by a fire in Alamosa in 1953. Because of its popularity, there has been speculation that the D&RGW destroyed it on purpose to drive revenue down so they could abandon the line from Silverton to Antonito. The recreation of the Silver Vista was built in 2006. It runs daily throughout the summer.

Original Silver Vista 313

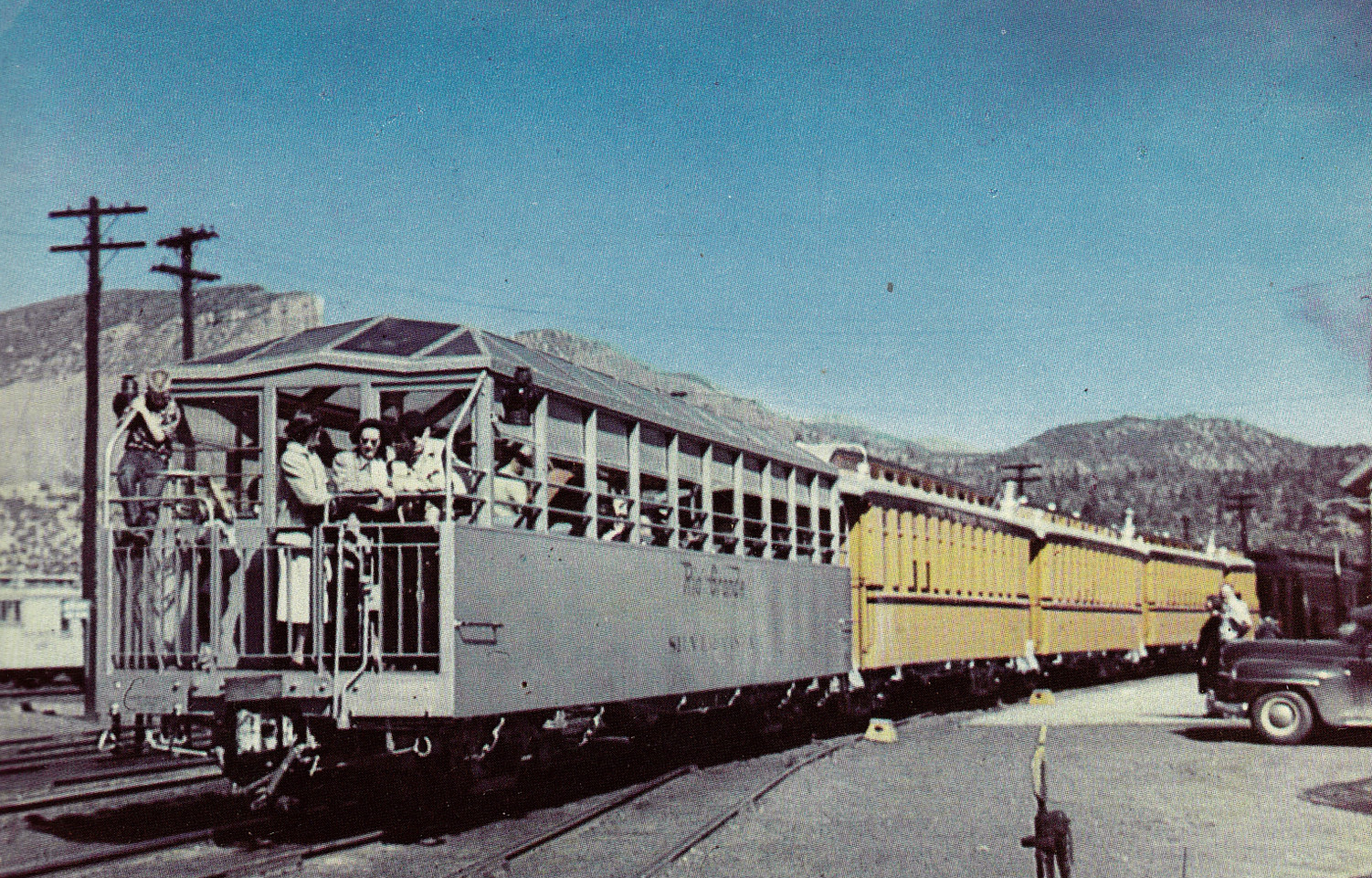
The original D&RG Silver Vista car

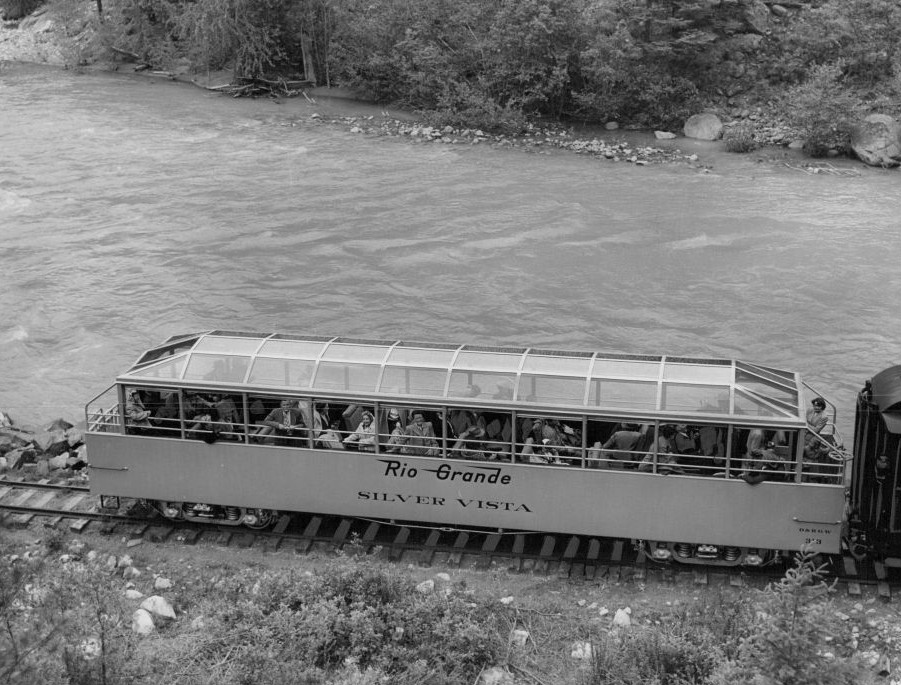
Side view of the car in 1951

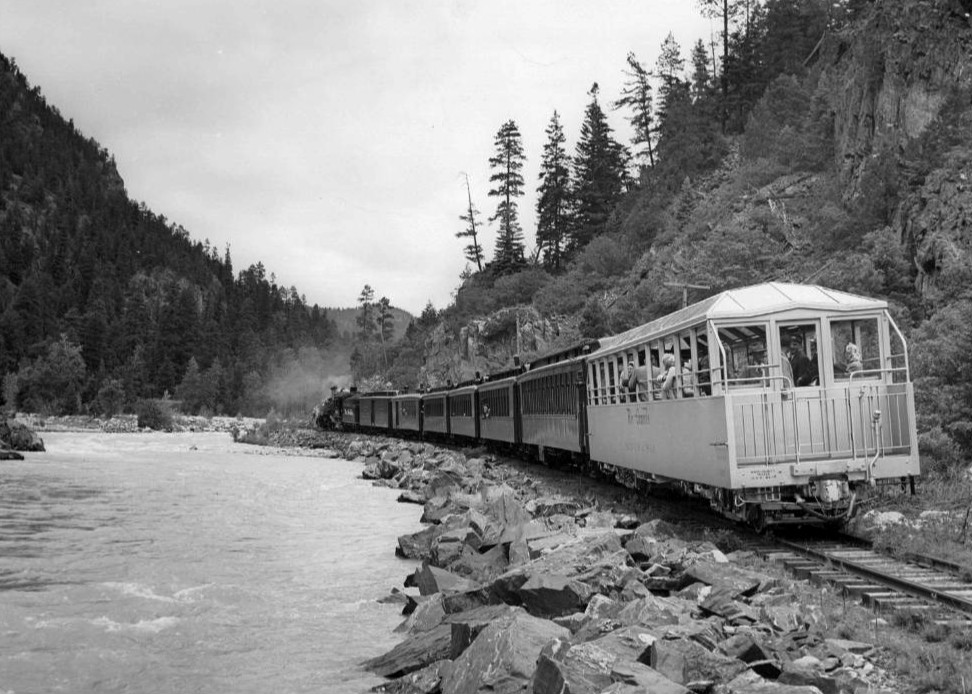
The observation car on the Silverton route in 1951

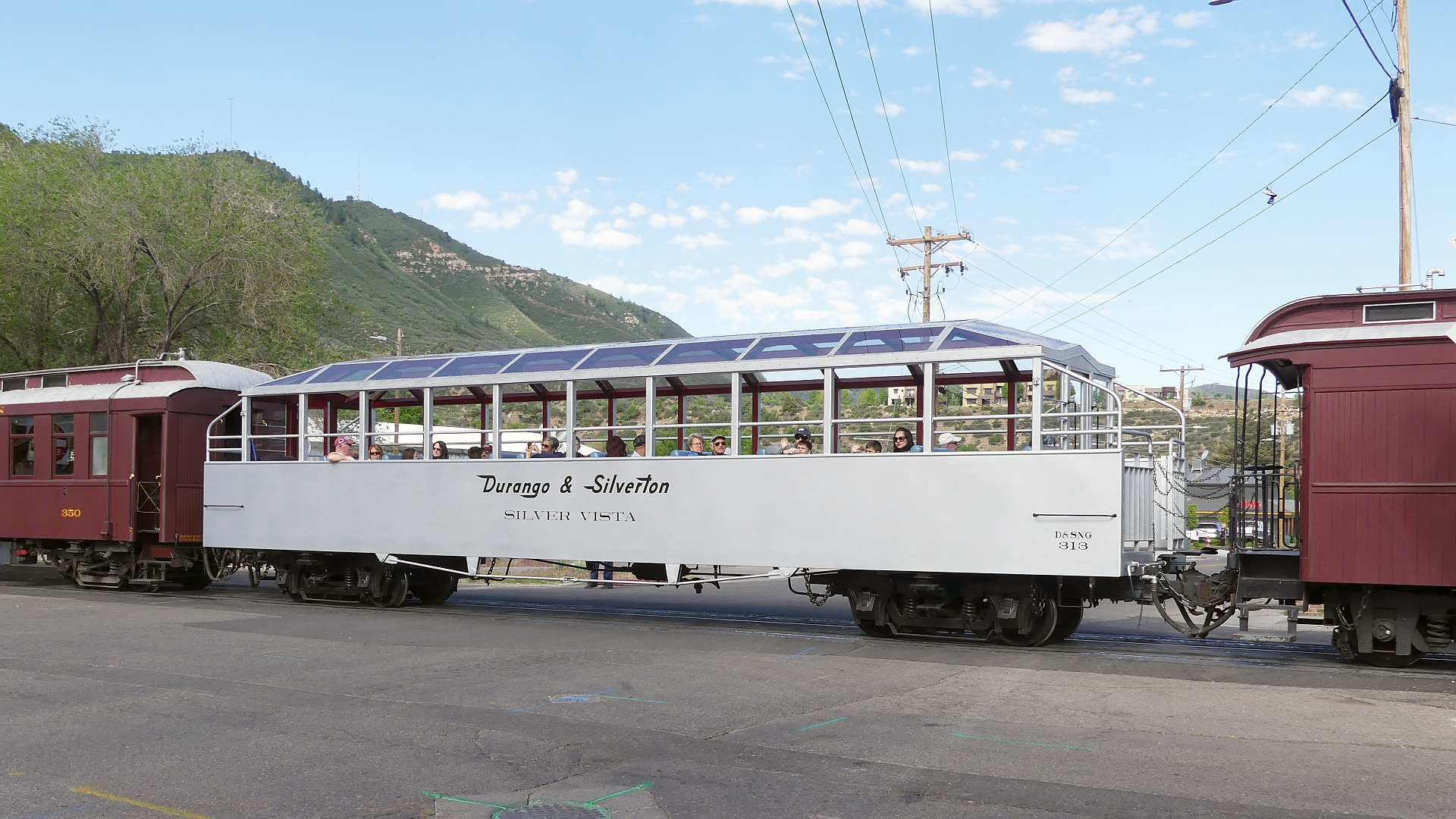
The current Silver Vista in 2024

==== Rio Grande No. 410 ====
Built in the winter of 1987–1988, the Rio Grande was originally railbus trailer 1002 and was painted red. It was used with the Animas Canyon Railway Diesel-powered rail-bus. It was stored from 1992 to 1997, until it was rebuilt as an open observation car 313. It was given number 313, because it resembled the Silver Vista. After the Silver Vista was built in 2006, it became open observation car 410. In the winter of 2006–2007 it was again rebuilt into an open air observation car with comfortable and large overstuffed seats for a more expansive view. It runs daily during the summer.

=== Cabooses ===
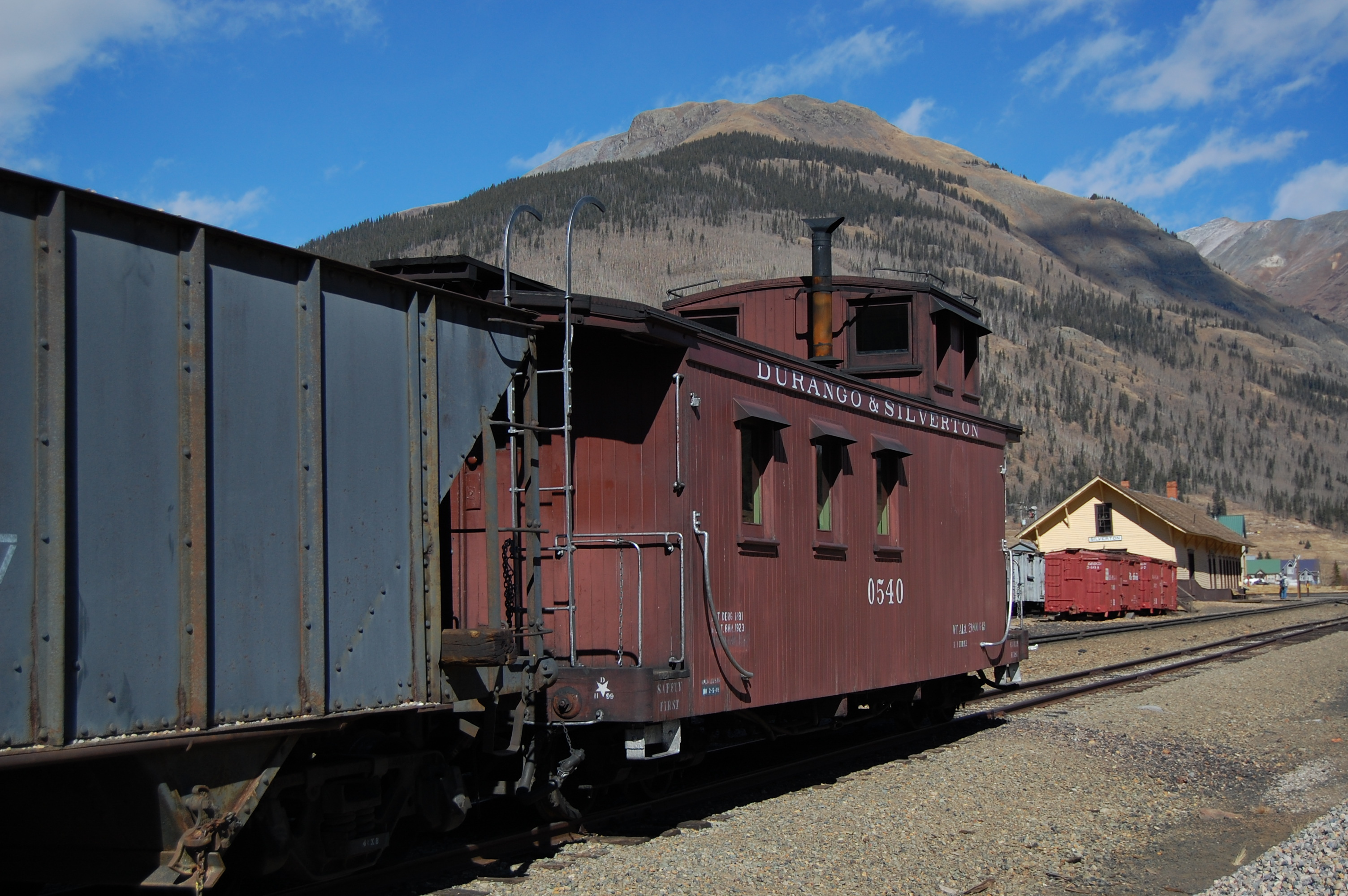
Caboose #0540 in Silverton Yard

Caboose No. 0505 was built in 1886 and is stocked with provisions to provide shelter and food. It is currently out of service.

Caboose No. 0540 was built in 1881 and is a mini-warehouse, carrying the most common tools and supplies. It is used by Maintenance of Way.

==== Caboose No. 0500 ====
Caboose No. 0500 is 17 feet (5.2 m) long, and was built in 1886. It was originally known as D&RG No. 1. In 1950 it was sold to Bob Richardson, then again in 1987 to a business in Cripple Creek. In 1993 it was acquired by the D&SNG and was restored to its original condition. It is available for charter and can hold up to eight people. It is on display in the museum, out of service.

=== Rail Camp Car No. 3681 ===
Rail camp car No. 3681 is an ex-D&RGW boxcar. It was rebuilt by the D&SNG in 1984 with a kitchen, a bathroom and beds. It is pulled to Cascade Canyon Wye for elegant camping. It can hold a group of up to eight people. It is currently out of service.

=== Coaches Not in Service ===
- Mail baggage car No. 66 was built in 1887. For some years it was the base of operations for the Animas River Railway in Rockwood, Colorado. Car No. 66 served as the office, ticket window, and waiting room for the railway. It was then moved to Hermosa, Colorado as the maintenance of way office.
- Mail baggage car No. 119 was built in 1882. Sold to private individual in 2020 for eventual restoration.
- Coach No. 460 is the only 3 ft (914 mm) narrow-gauge tourist sleeper remaining from a group built in 1886 for the D&RG. In the early 1900s it was assigned to work service and was used on a D&RGW wrecking train as late as 1957. Then it was sold to the Black Hills Central Railroad in South Dakota. Then in 1983, the D&SNG purchased coach No. 460. It has been chosen to be preserved as is and has no plans to enter service.
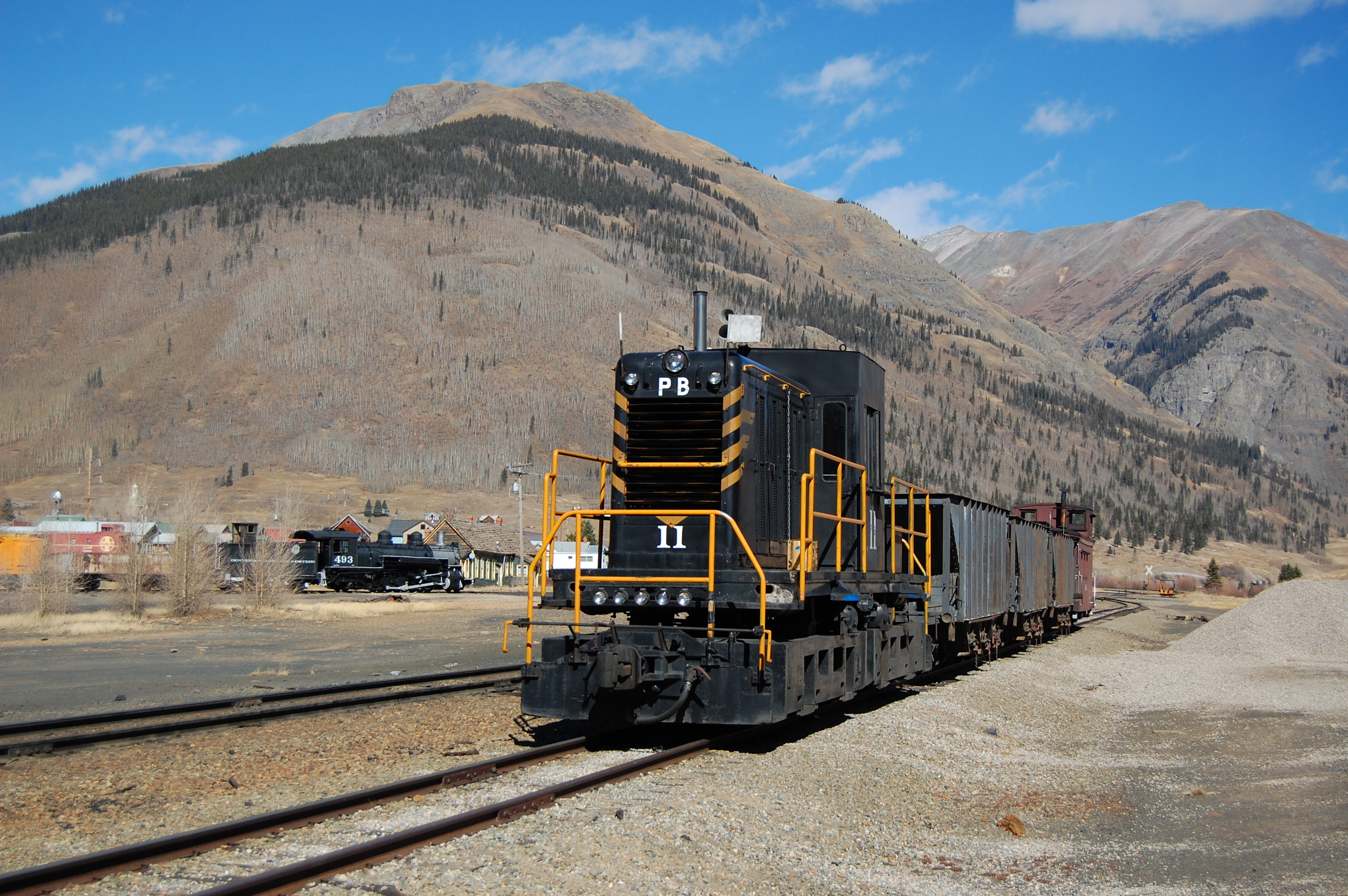
Maintenance of way train in Silverton on October 25, 2012

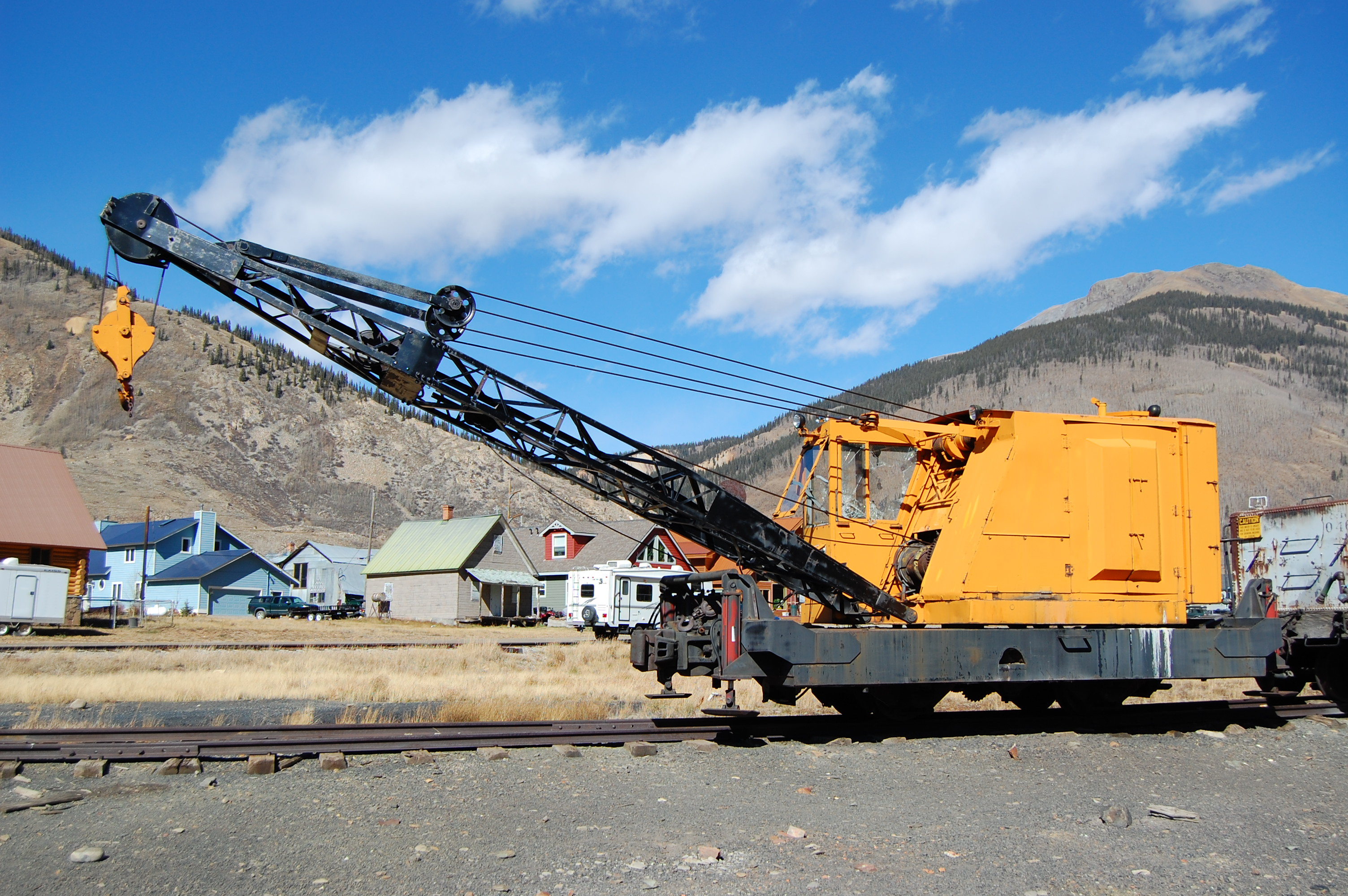
Maintenance crane in Silverton on October 25, 2012

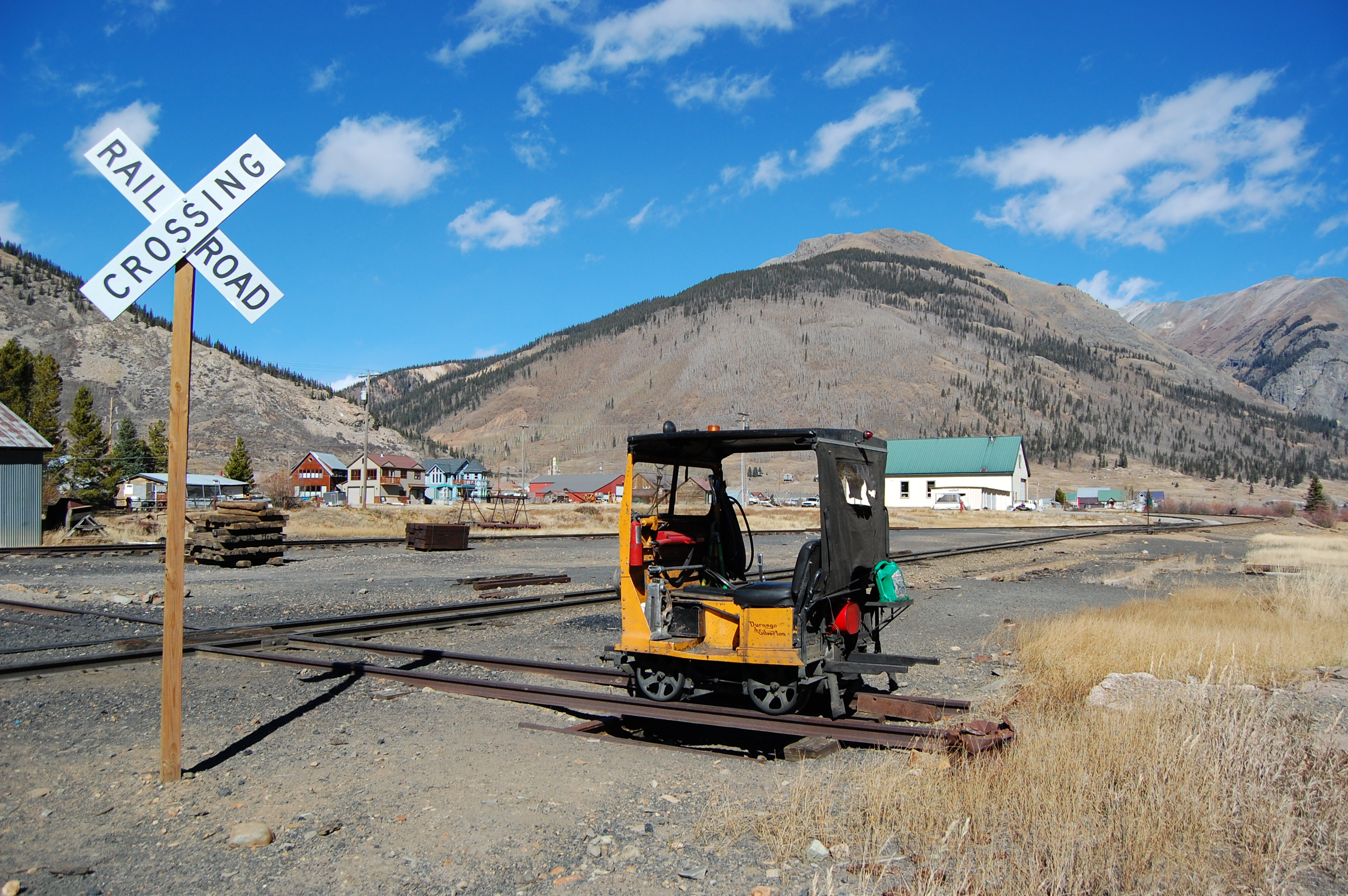
Speeder #9002 in Silverton on October 25, 2012

== Visiting equipment ==
Just as narrow-gauge equipment and parts are rare, narrow-gauge railroads are rare these days too. When narrow-gauge pieces of equipment come back to life there are very few places in the United States where they can run. Many of these pieces run during the railroad's annual Railfest held every August. Below are some pieces of 3 ft (914 mm) narrow-gauge equipment that visit the D&SNG railroad.

=== D&RGW No. 315 ===
D&RGW No. 315 is a C-18 locomotive, built in 1895 by Baldwin Locomotive Works. It originally was owned by the Florence and Cripple Creek Railroad as No. 3. It was then bought by D&RG and became No. 425 and, after the railroad was reorganized into D&RGW in 1924, it became No. 315. Around 1941, 315 made its way to Durango and became a yard switcher. It worked around Durango until 1949. To save it from being scrapped, it was leased by the City of Durango as a display. When the D&RGW abandoned the line to Durango, 315 was donated to the Chamber of Commerce in 1968. In 1986 it was put on display at Santa Rita Park. Ownership of 315 was changed from the Chamber of Commerce to the City of Durango. It was restored to operating condition from 1998 to 2007 by the Durango Railroad Historical Society with some assistance from the D&SNG. It was first steamed up and moved under its own power after 58 years on August 24, 2007, at the D&SNG roundhouse during a photography event. Since then the DRHS has operated the locomotive occasionally on the D&SNG and on the Cumbres and Toltec Scenic Railroad. Since 2016, No. 315 has been operating on special excursions and charters at the C&TSRR on loan by the DRHS until at least 2025. In October 2021, it was temporarily taken out of service for its Federal Railroad Administration (FRA) federally mandated 1,472-day inspection and overhaul, but later returned to service on March 8, 2023.

=== E&P No. 4 ===
Eureka and Palisade No. 4 is a Class 8/18 C 4-4-0 locomotive, built in 1875 by Baldwin Locomotive Works. It originally was owned by the Eureka and Palisade Railroad, and was later sold to the Sierra Nevada Wood and Lumber Company. In 1938, it was sold to Warner Bros. and was used in many films. Eventually, the engine went to the Old Vegas amusement park in Henderson, Nevada, where it became badly damaged by a fire. Finally, it was bought by Dan Markoff and restored to operating condition. Dan privately owns the engine, and on occasion brings it to various railroads to operate, including the D&SNG.

=== Casey Jones ===
The Casey Jones railbus was built in 1915 out of a Model T and is a debatable predecessor of the Galloping Goose. It was originally designed to be an ambulance servicing the Sunnyside Mine in Eureka, Colorado, and was often used by mine officials to commute to Silverton on the Silverton Northern Railroad. It has room for 11 passengers. The Casey Jones was restored and is owned by the San Juan Historical Society in Silverton Colorado. It has run on the D&SNG just a handful of times in the past during special events. It is on display at the Silverton Northern Engine House in the Summer, where D&RGW No. 315 is also stored when it is not visiting another railroad.

=== Galloping Goose Railbusses ===
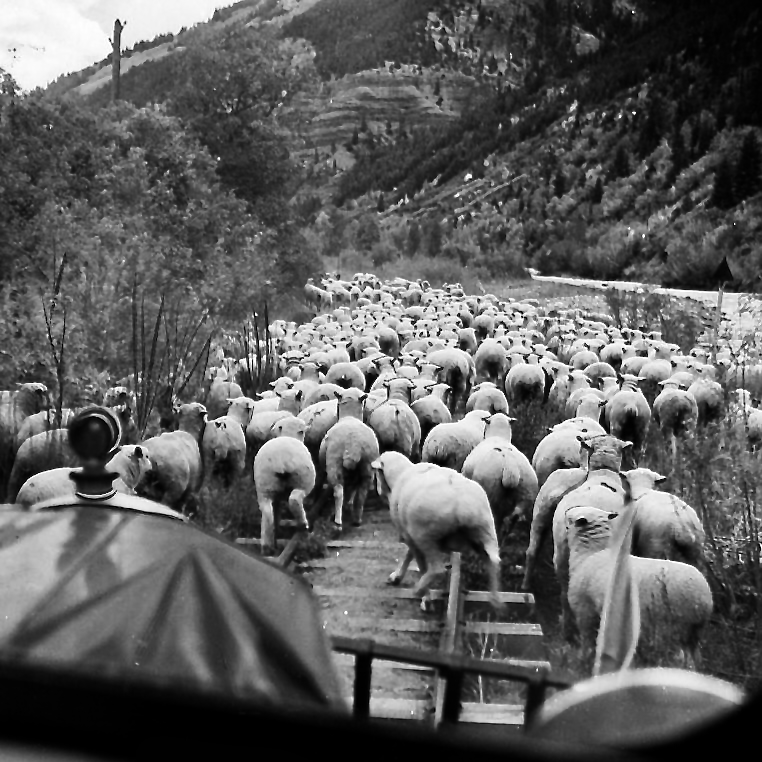
Slow ride on the Galloping Goose, 1951

The Galloping Goose railcars are products of the Rio Grande Southern Railroad, a fleet of seven homemade vehicles used to haul the US mail and some passengers during the Great Depression. Despite the overall demise of the RGS, 6 of the 7 "Geese" have survived today, and a couple of them have visited the D&SNG a few different times, most notably No. 5. Galloping Goose No. 5 was built with a 1928 Pierce-Arrow limousine body and running gear, and was rebuilt in 1946–47 using a World War II surplus GMC gasoline truck engine and a Wayne Corporation school bus body. In 1950, the freight/mail compartment was converted to carry 20 additional passengers for sightseeing trips. After RGS was scrapped in 1953, Galloping Goose No. 5 came to rest in Dolores, Colorado. Galloping Goose No. 5 was completely restored to operating condition in 1998 by the Galloping Goose Historical Society in Dolores, Colorado.

=== Southern Pacific No. 18 ===
SP No. 18 is a narrow-gauge 4-6-0 "Ten Wheeler" type locomotive built in 1911 by Baldwin Locomotive Works. It was restored by the Eastern California Museum from 2009 to 2017, with some help from members of the D&S Shop crew. No. 18 later arrived to Durango on lease from the Eastern California Museum in November 2018 and it stayed until October, 2019. During that time, it was used for oil-fired training in preparation for the D&SNG's conversion of their steam locomotives from coal to oil for fuel. On April 8, 2021, it was announced that No. 18 was to return to the D&SNG from April 2021 to October 2021, and on April 11, it departed for Durango, Colorado via truck. In the 2021 summer season the locomotive has been in helper service for the 15-car Silverton Train, doubleheading from Hermosa to Rockwood, and then from Tank Creek all the way to Silverton. As the D&SNG works to convert more of its locomotives to oil, No. 18 has been a vital resource serving as a helper.

=== Rio Grande Southern 20 ===
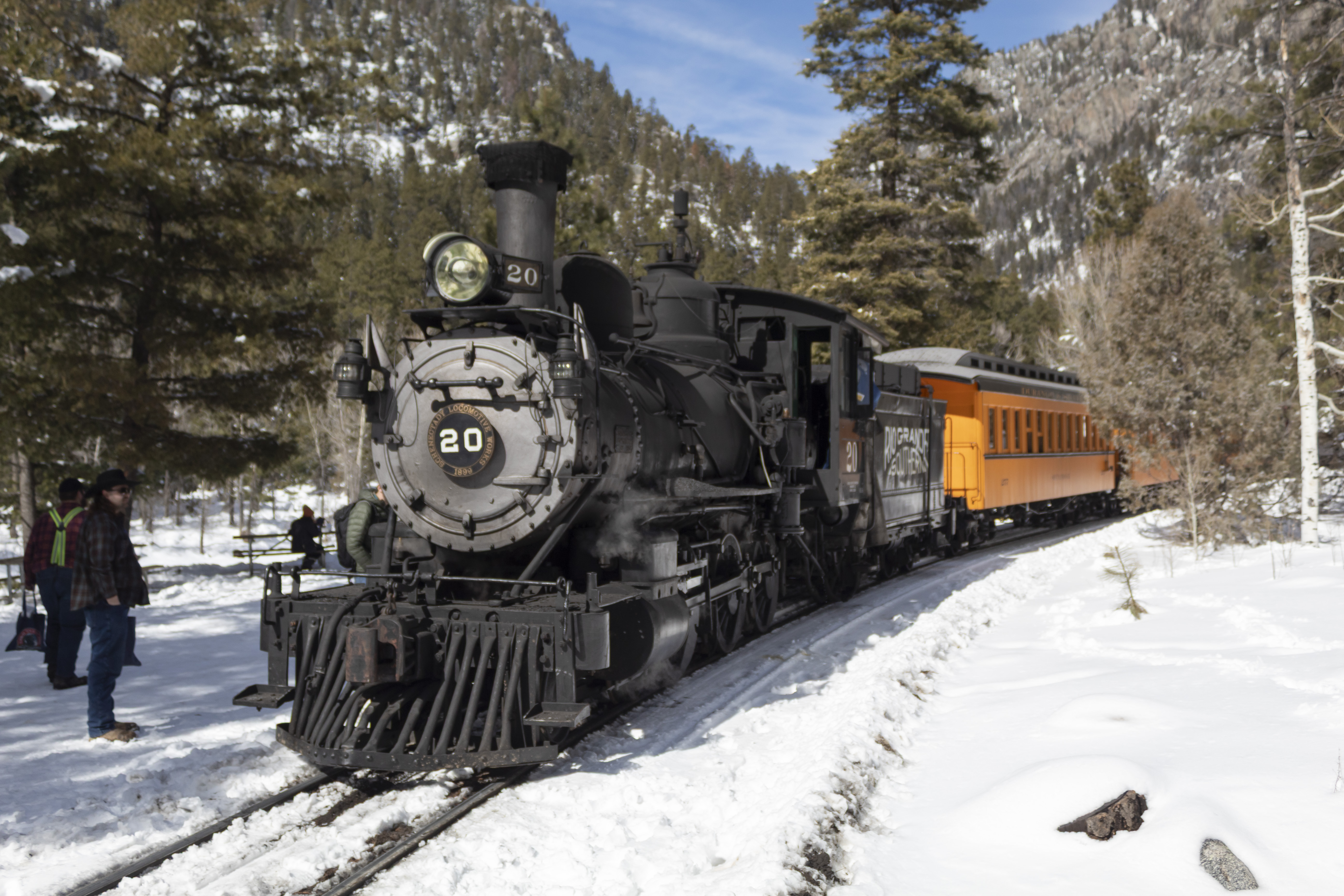
RGS 20 at the Cascade Canyon wye during the Hyce Charter on the Durango & Silverton Narrow Gauge Railroad.

Rio Grande Southern No. 20 is a 4-6-0 operated by the Colorado Railroad Museum. The locomotive came to the Durango & Silverton for an extended residency in the winter of 2025-2026, and was the first coal burning locomotive to operate again on the line since the D&SNG's own locomotives were converted to oil firing. The locomotive participated in a series of three sequential photo charter events in February 2026 from the 18th to 22nd, organized by Lerro Photography, the D&SNG, and Colorado Railroad Museum volunteer & YouTuber Mark Huber respectively.

=== Denver & Rio Grande Western 340 ===
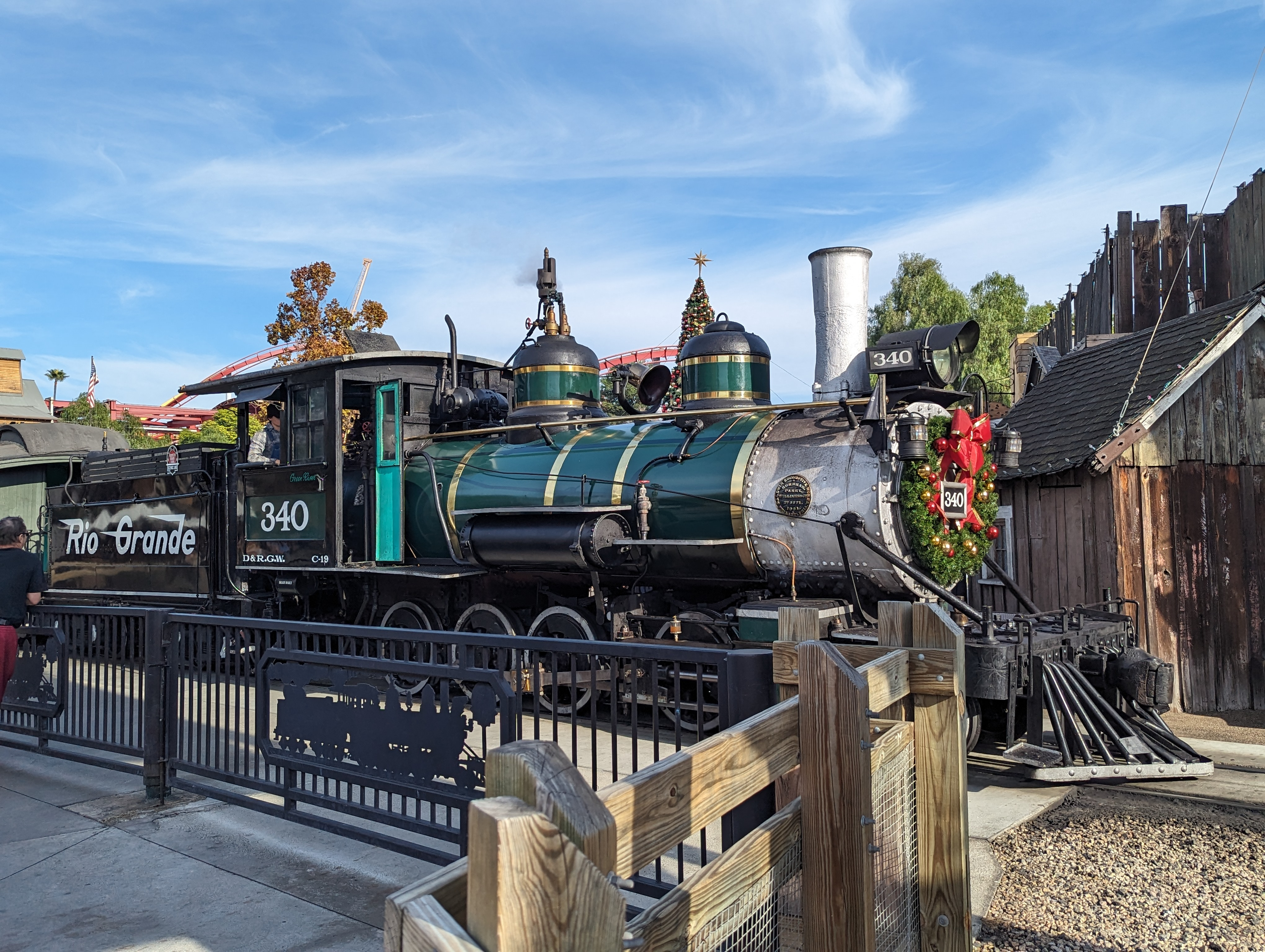
DR&GW No. 340 at Knott's Berry Farm, December 2023; prior to its rebuild and runs in Durango.

D&RGW 340, which has spent most of its preserved life operating on the Ghost Town & Calico Railroad at Knott's Berry Farm came to Durango for a rebuild, following the D&SNG's work on Rio Grande Southern 41 a few years prior which also operates at Knott's. Following the rebuild of 340, the D&SNG hosted a series of runs with the engine in June 2026 marking the locomotive's first trip on former Rio Grande rails in over 70 years before the locomotive returns to California.
