= White Pass and Yukon Route Class DL-535E =

Six-axle diesel locomotive used by the WP&YR since 1969

White Pass and Yukon Route Class DL-535E MLW-Worthington Model Series C-14
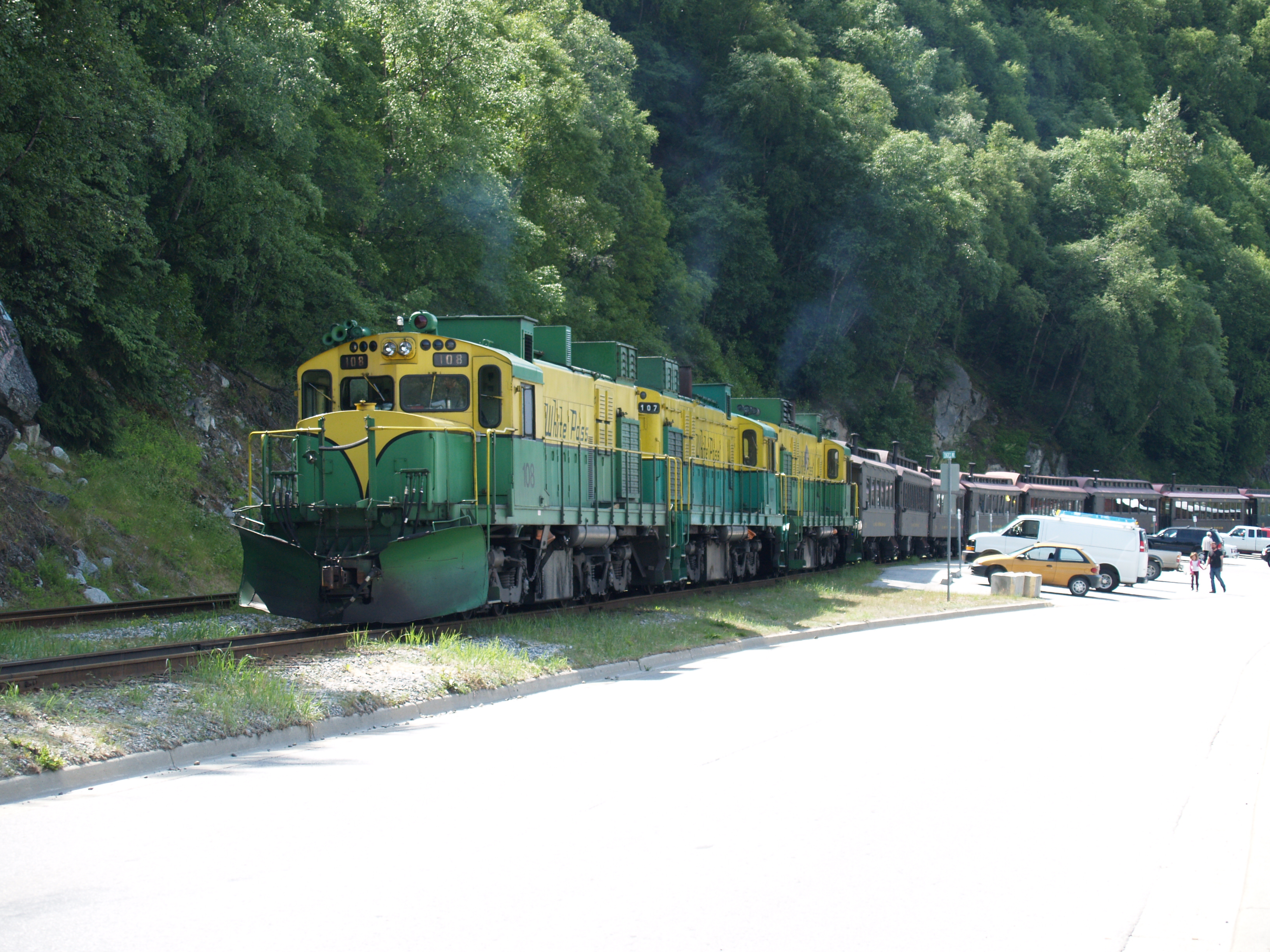
- A trio of DL-535E locomotives haul a White Pass and Yukon train in 2009
Type and origin
- Power type: Diesel-electric
- Builder: Montreal Locomotive Works (10); Bombardier Transportation (4)
- Serial number: 6023-01, 6023-02, 6023-03, 6023-04, 6023-05, 6023-06, 6023-07, 6054-01, 6054-02, 6054-03, 6123-01, 6123-02, 6123-03, 6123-04
- Build date: 1969-1971, 1982
- Total produced: 14
Specifications
- Configuration
  - AAR: C-C
- Gauge: 3 ft (914 mm)
- Loco weight: 216,000 lb (98 t; 98,000 kg)
- Prime mover: ALCO 6-251D
- RPM
  - Maximum RPM: 1100 RPM
- Traction motors: GE 764pc2
- Cylinders: 6
- Cylinder size: 9 in × 10.5 in (230 mm × 270 mm)
- Gear ratio: 90:17
Performance figures
- Power output: 1,200 hp (895 kW; 0.895 MW)
- Tractive effort
  - Starting: 43,200 lbf (192.16 kN) @25%
  - Continuous: 64,200 lbf (285.58 kN) @25 mph (40 km/h)
Career
- Operators: White Pass and Yukon Route; Durango and Silverton Narrow Gauge Railroad; USG Corporation
- Numbers: 101-114
- Disposition: Eleven preserved, three scrapped

The White Pass and Yukon Route Class DL-535E (sometimes known as the MLW-Worthington Model Series C-14) is a series of narrow-gauge diesel locomotives that were custom-built by the Montreal Locomotive Works of Montreal, Quebec in Canada between 1969 and 1971 for the White Pass and Yukon Route (WP&Y) in Skagway, Alaska.

== History ==
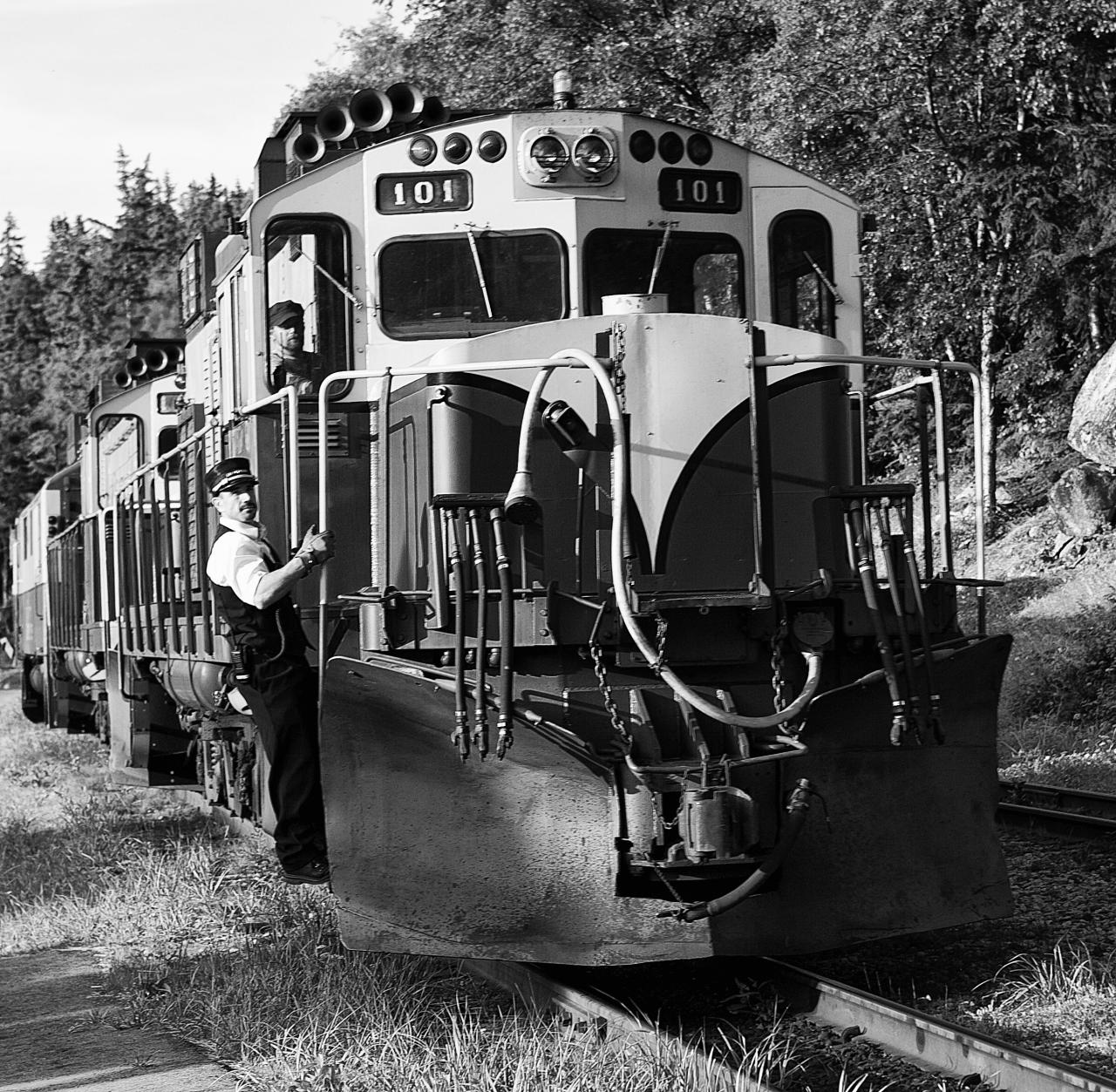
White Pass and Yukon Route #101 at Skagway, Alaska.

Units 101-107 were built in May 1969 while units 108-110 were built in December 1971. They are powered by an American Locomotive Company (ALCO) model 6-251D prime mover. In July 1982, the White Pass and Yukon Route (WP&Y) ordered an additional four units, those being units 111-114, built by the Bombardier Transportation, complete with a wide cab instead of the traditional standard cab at the time, but all but one of these new units were ultimately never delivered to them and eventually placed in storage, 114 being the only one to ever operate on the White Pass and Yukon Route after being sold to the railroad in 1995.

In 1969, Units #102 and #105 were both severely damaged and burned beyond repair in a roundhouse fire in Skagway, Alaska and later scrapped as a result. In 1992, Nos. 101, 103, 104, 106, and 107 were sold to Sociedad Colombiana de Transport Ferroviaro in South America until later being sold back to the White Pass and Yukon Route in 1999 for tourist excursion service.

In April 2020, Nos. 101, 103, 106, and 107 were sold again to the Durango and Silverton Narrow Gauge Railroad (D&SNG) in Durango, Colorado, with Nos. 101 and 107 both arriving at the D&SNG in August and September of that year respectively and Nos. 103 and 106 both arriving at the D&SNG in September 2021. This was due to the late delivery of D&SNG MP2000NG type diesels Nos. 1201 and 1202, which were both custom-built by the now-defunct Motive Power and Equipment Solutions, Inc. (MP&ES) of Greenville, South Carolina sometime between 2018 and 2020, having both been rebuilt from two former Tri-Rail EMD F40PHL-2 type diesels.

From 1982 to 1991, Nos. 111, 112, 113, and 114 were stored at Soulanges Industries, Les Cèdres, Quebec. Nos. 111, 112, and 113 were eventually sold in 1991 to the United States Gypsum Corporation in Plaster City, California while No. 114 was eventually sold to the WP&Y in 1995 for tourist excursion service.

In 1992, No. 113 was destroyed in an accident and later scrapped as a result. As of 2020, No. 114 remains at the WP&Y where it is currently stored out of service, having last operated sometime in the late 2010s. On November 11, 2023, the Cumbres and Toltec Scenic Railroad (C&TS) announced in a commission meeting that they would acquire No. 114 for $120,000.
