= Galloping Goose (railcar) =

Improvised railcars of the Rio Grande Southern Railroad

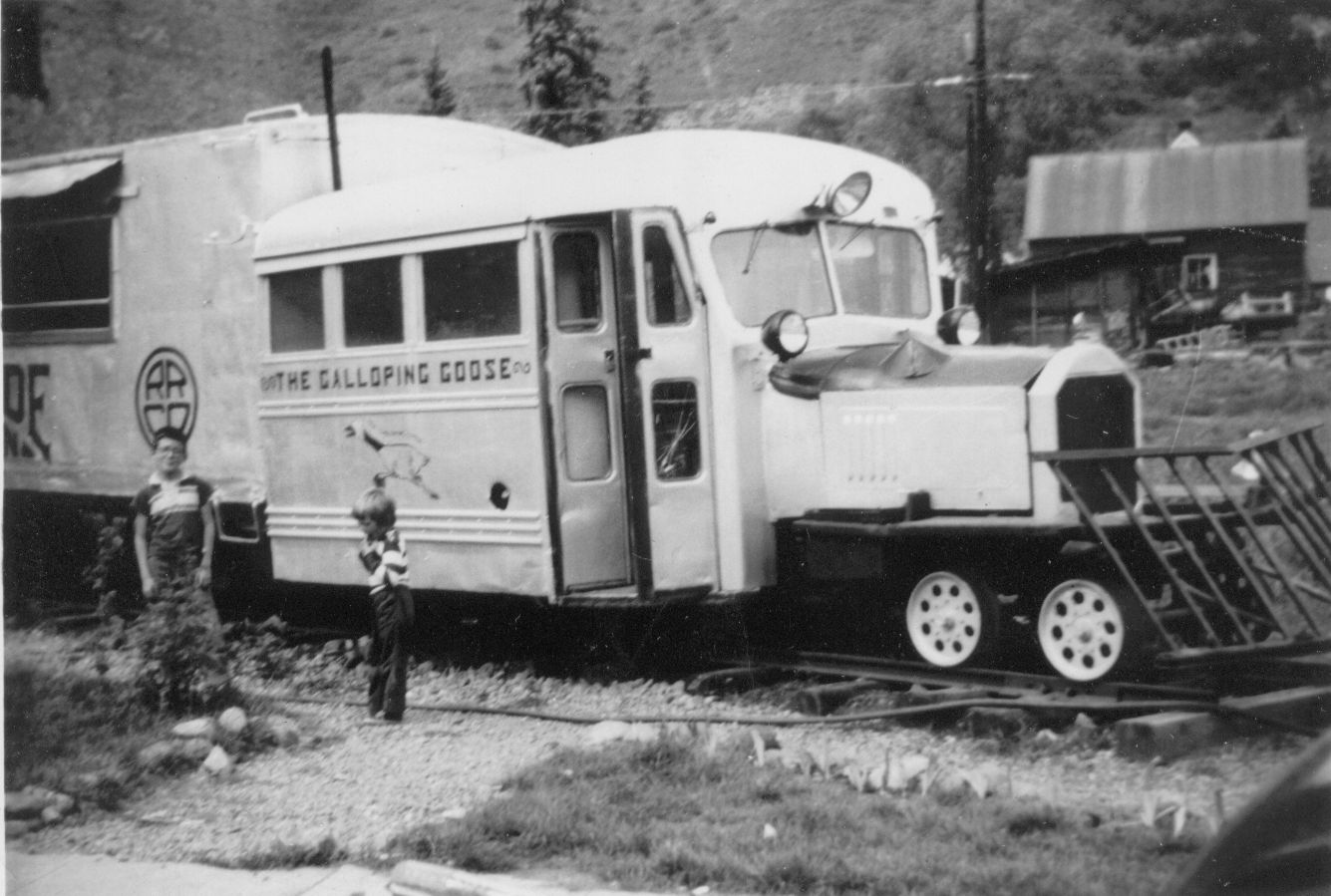
Galloping Goose, Telluride, Colorado, 1952

Galloping Goose is the popular name given to a series of seven railcars (officially designated as "motors" by the railroad), built in the 1930s by the Rio Grande Southern Railroad (RGS) and operated until the end of service on the line in the early 1950s. They were derived from full-sized automobiles.

Originally running steam locomotives on narrow gauge railways, the perpetually struggling RGS developed the first of the "geese" as a way to keep its contract to run mail into towns in the Rocky Mountains in Colorado. There was not enough passenger or cargo income to justify continuing the expensive steam train service at then-current levels, but it was believed that a downsized railway would return to profitability. The steam trains would transport heavy cargo and peak passenger loads, but motors would handle lighter loads.

Motors were not only less expensive to operate, but were also significantly lighter, thus reducing impact on the rails and roadbeds. This cost saving meant that the first Goose was paid off and making a profit within three weeks of going into service. RGS built more Geese, and operated them until the company abandoned their right-of-way in 1952.

== History ==
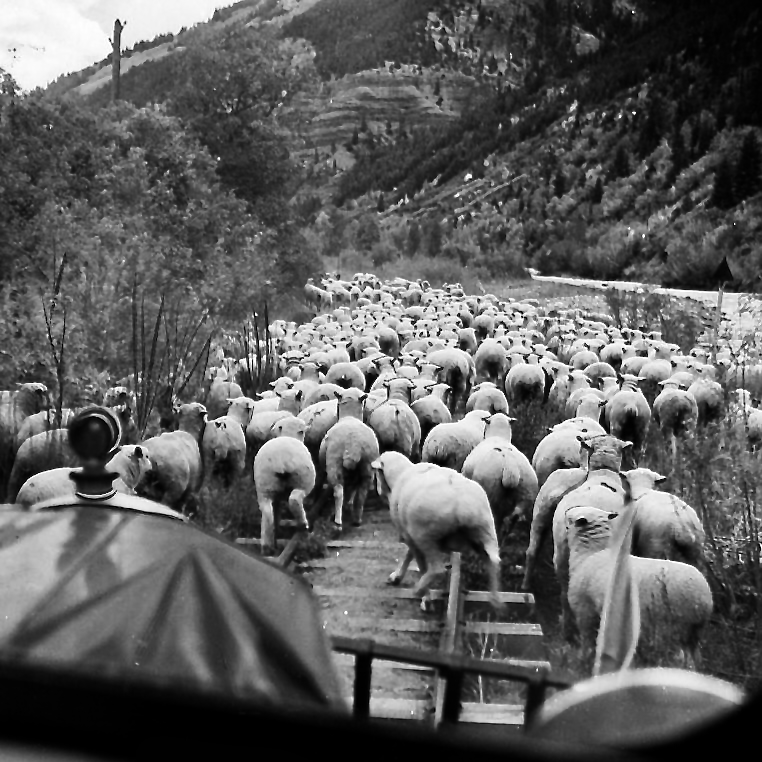
Galloping Goose blocked by sheep, 1951.

The RGS built its first motor in 1913, as a track maintenance crew vehicle. This was wrecked in 1925, but inspired the idea of using motors for scheduled service.

All of the "geese" were built in the railroad's shops at Ridgway, Colorado. The first was built in 1931 from the body of a Buick "Master Six" four-door sedan. It was more conventional in its construction than the later geese, though it had a two-axle truck in place of the front axle. Part of the rear of the car was replaced by a truck stake-bed for carrying freight and mail; this was later enclosed and partially fitted with seating. It was used for two years to carry passengers, US Mail, and light freight before being scrapped. A second "goose" was built in the same year from another Buick, but later versions used Pierce-Arrow bodies except for #6, which was constructed partly out of parts taken from the scrapped #1.

No. 2 and No. 6 were constructed with two trucks, with the rear truck powered on both axles. #2 had an enclosed freight compartment (like a very short boxcar), while #6 had an open bed similar to #1 (but larger). It was used only for work train service. The other four had three trucks and were articulated in the same manner as a tractor-trailer truck. In these, the second truck was powered, and the freight compartment was essentially a conventional boxcar.

Initially, the "geese" were painted in black and dark green. In 1935 they were all painted in a silver scheme which they retain to this day, though the style of lettering and heralds changed over the years. In 1945, #3, #4, and #5 were rebuilt with Wayne bus bodies (at least the front half) replacing the old Pierce-Arrow bodies. This provided more passenger seating and comfort. A year later they also received new war surplus GMC engines.

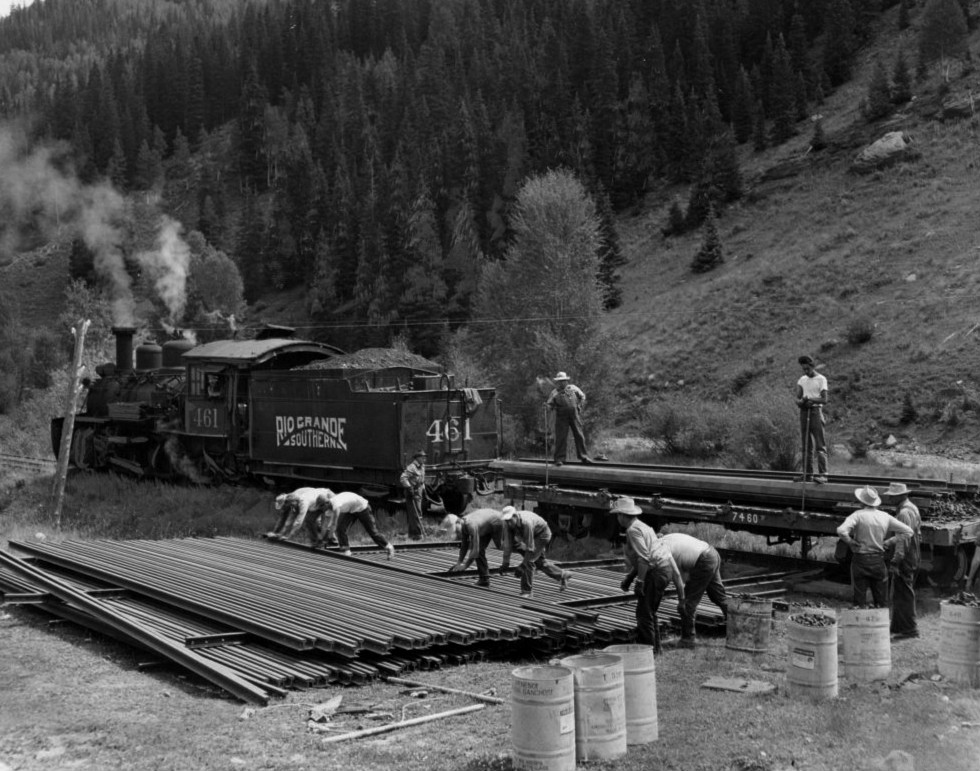
Crews taking up the narrow-gauge rails on which the Geese ran, September 1952

In 1950, when the railroad finally lost its mail contract (in favor of highway mail carriers), #3, #4, #5, and #7 were converted for tourist operations, and the "Galloping Goose" name was officially recognized by the railroad. Large windows were cut in the sides of the freight compartments, and seating was added. A figure of a running goose and the words "Galloping Goose" were added to the carbody doors. This service lasted only two years, and the last work of the "geese" on their home line was to take up the rails.

It is unclear exactly where the name "Galloping Goose" comes from. It is mostly commonly suggested that it referred to the way the carbody and the freight compartment tended to rock back and forth on the line's sometimes precarious track. It is also suggested, though, that the name arose because the "geese" were equipped with air horns rather than the whistles of the steam locomotives. The name was used informally for years before the tourist operations, though the railroad officially referred to the units as "motors".

A similar unit was built for the San Cristobal Railroad, and was rebuilt by RGS in 1934–35. When the San Christobal folded in 1939, this unit was returned to the RGS railroad and dismantled, with some parts going to rebuild and maintain Goose No. 2.

The Galloping Goose Regional Trail on Vancouver Island was named after a similar unit that ran on the Vancouver Island section of the Canadian National Railway from 1922 to 1931.

Galloping Goose #5 (along with many local landmarks) was popularized in C. W. McCall's song, "Gallopin' Goose".

== Surviving units ==
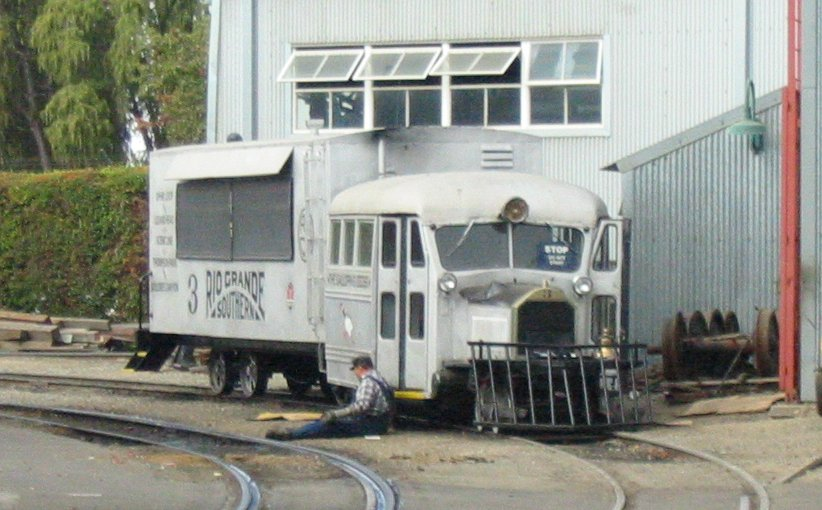
Weekly maintenance of Goose number 3 at Knott's Berry Farm

Of the seven "geese", only #1 does not survive; it was scrapped in 1933. However, a replica was built in 2000 for the Ridgway Railroad Museum and is operational today. The other six are located as follows:

- Geese #2, #6, and #7 are preserved at the Colorado Railroad Museum in Golden and are operational.
- Goose #3 was sold to Knott's Berry Farm and is operated on the Ghost Town & Calico Railroad regularly during off-season periods when park attendance is low.
- Goose #4 was on static display in Telluride, Colorado. It was restored to operation in Ridgway, Colorado, as of June 2012. With the restoration of Goose #4, all of the Geese are now operational.
- Goose #5 was bought by the city of Dolores, Colorado. After restoration in 1998 it is now operated from time to time on the Cumbres and Toltec and Durango and Silverton tourist railroads, as well as at the Colorado Railroad Museum.

== Gallery ==
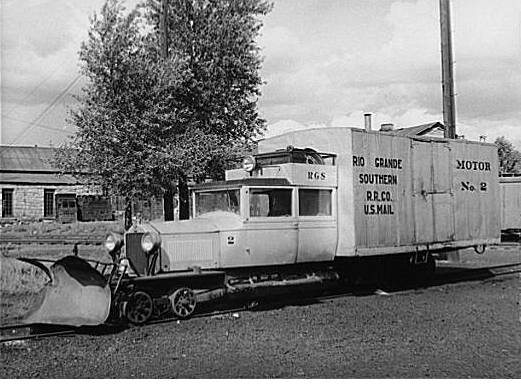
Goose number 2, 1940

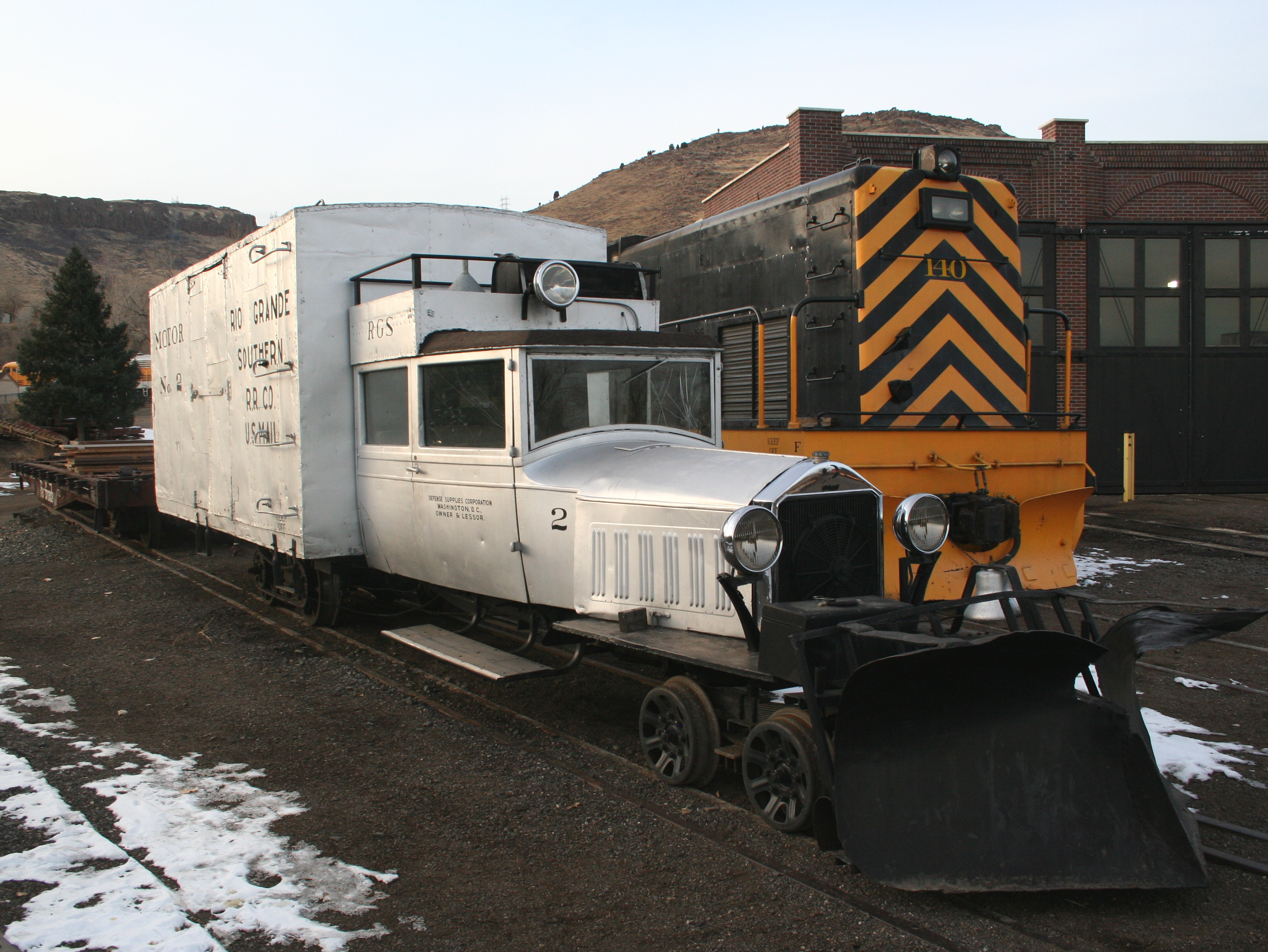
Goose number 2 at the Colorado Railroad Museum

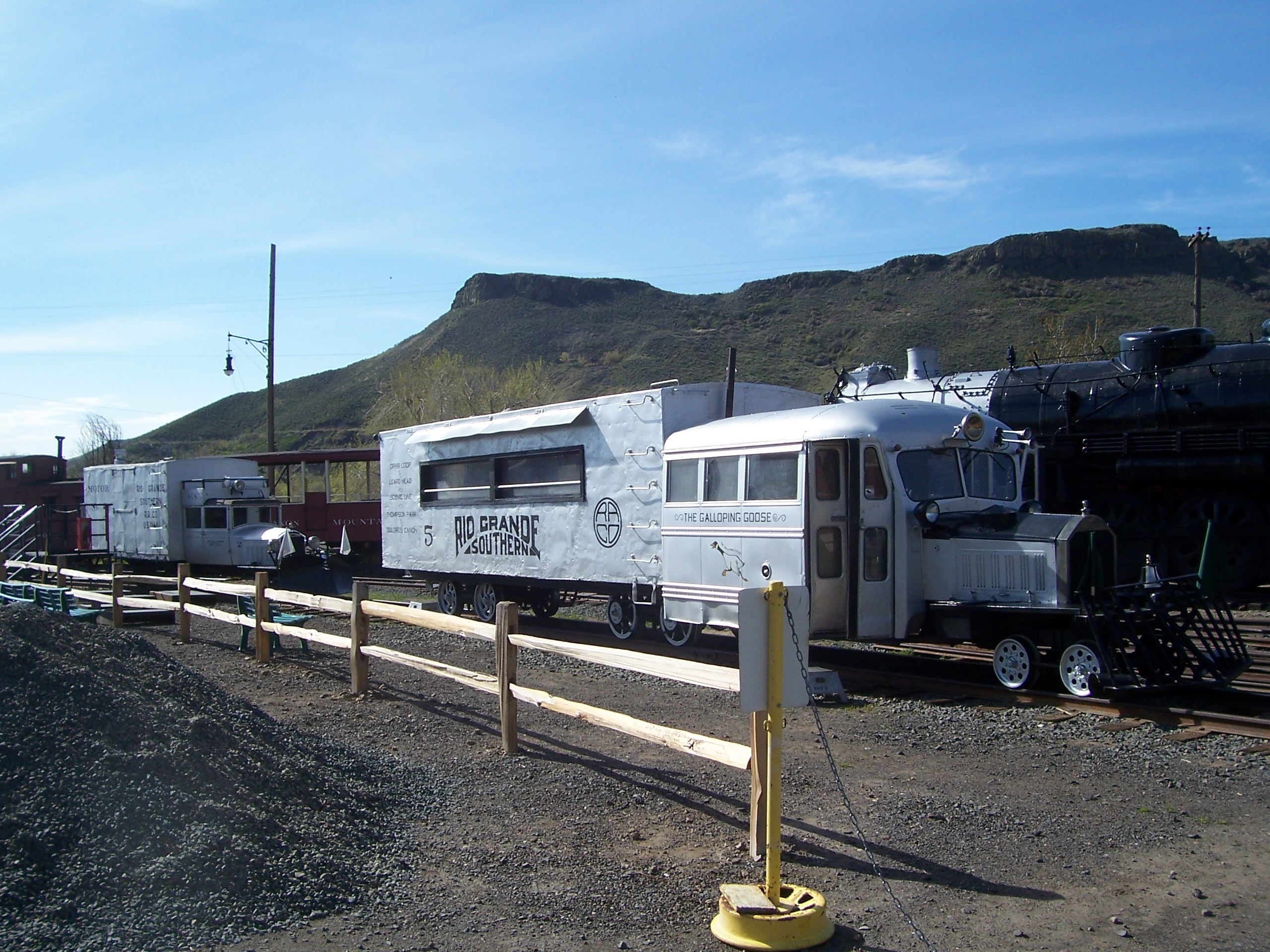
Goose 5 and Goose 2 at the Colorado Railroad Museum

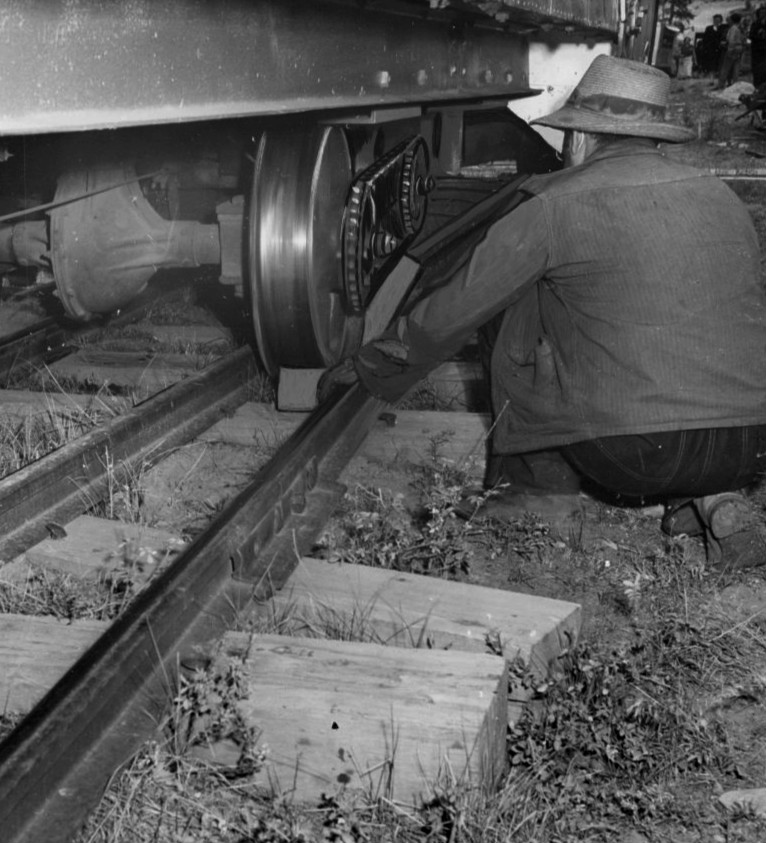
Re-railing a Goose after a derailment.

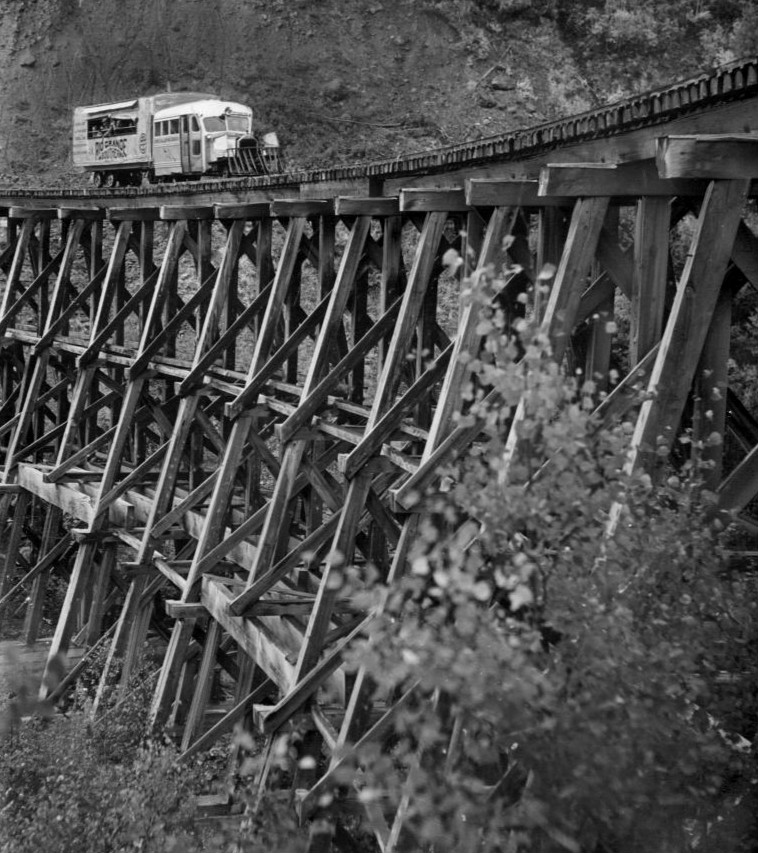
Galloping Goose #3 climbing a trestle that was part of the route

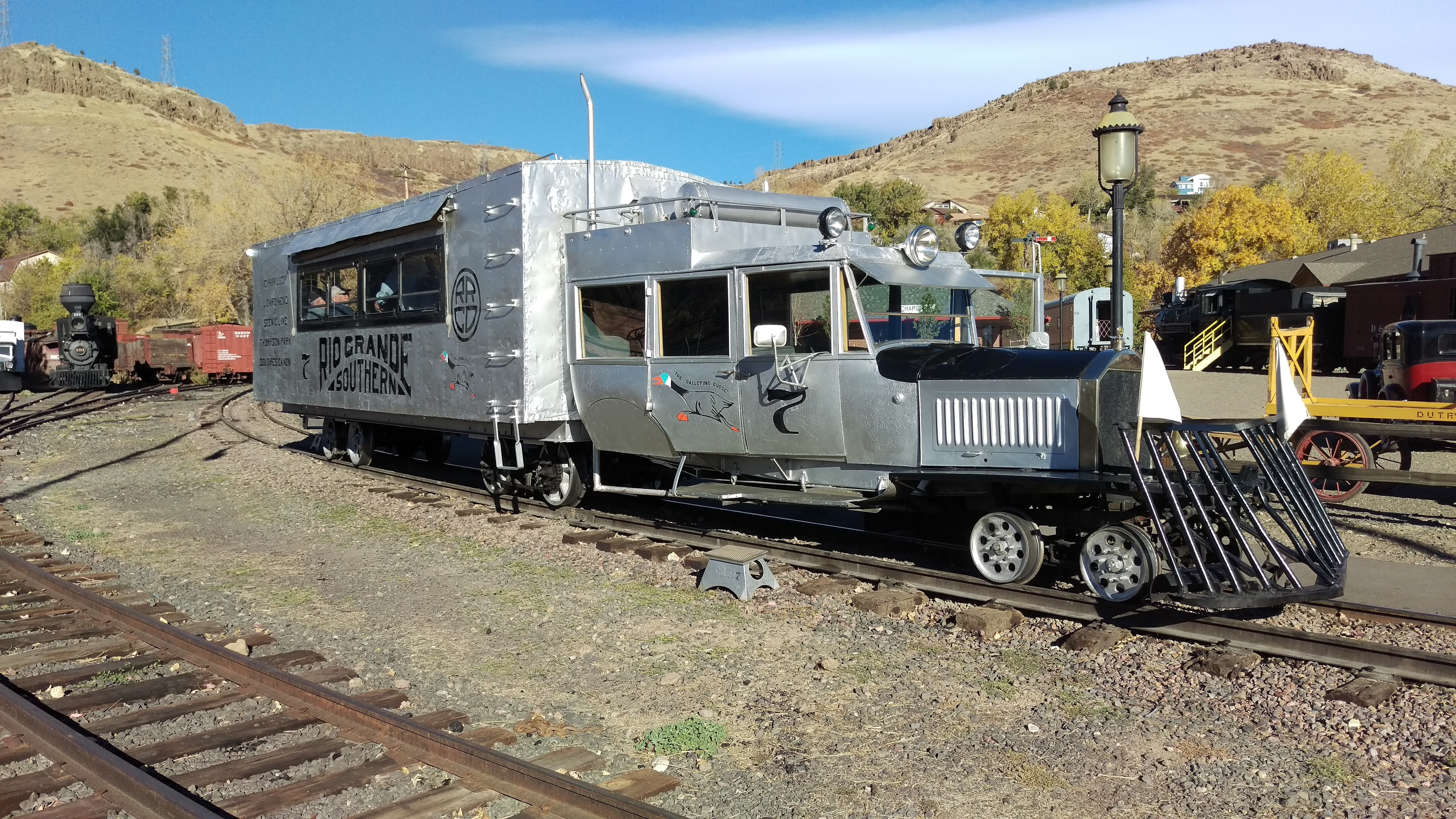
Galloping Goose #7 waits on a siding at the Colorado Railroad Museum.

== See also ==
- Railbus
