= Colorado Railroad Museum =

Coordinates: 39°46′19″N 105°11′35″W

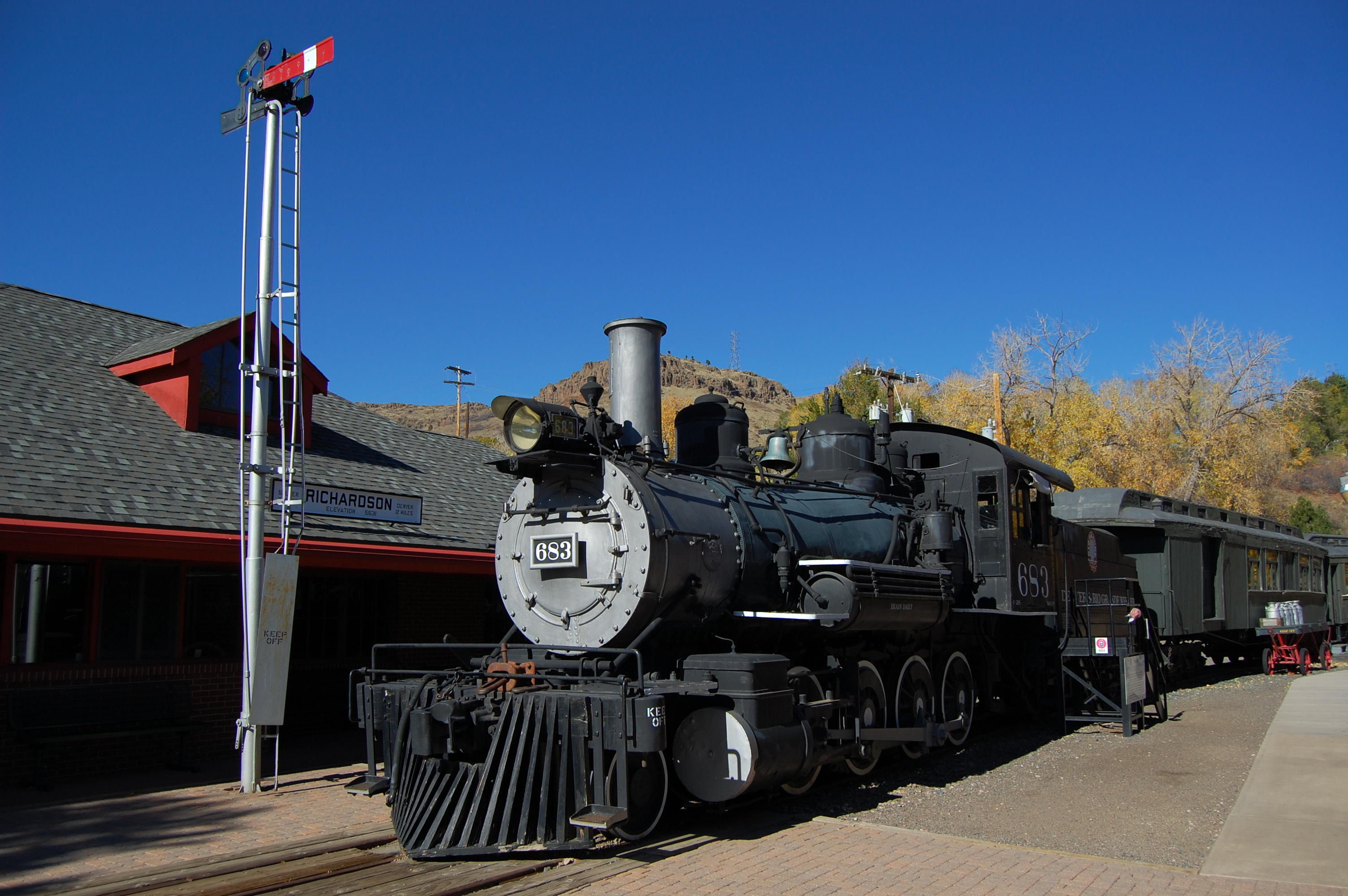
- Steam locomotive D&RGW #683 at a mock-up train station.
- Established: 1959
- Location: 17155 W 44th Ave; Golden, Colorado 80403
- Type: Railroad Museum
- Director: Paul Hammond
- Public transit access: None
- Website: coloradorailroadmuseum.org

The Colorado Railroad Museum is a non-profit railroad museum. The museum is located along the former Colorado and Southern Railway line on 19.5 acres (7.9 ha) at a point where Clear Creek flows between North and South Table Mountains in Golden, Colorado.

The museum was established in 1959 to preserve a record of Colorado's flamboyant railroad era, particularly the state's pioneering narrow-gauge mountain railroads.

== Facilities ==
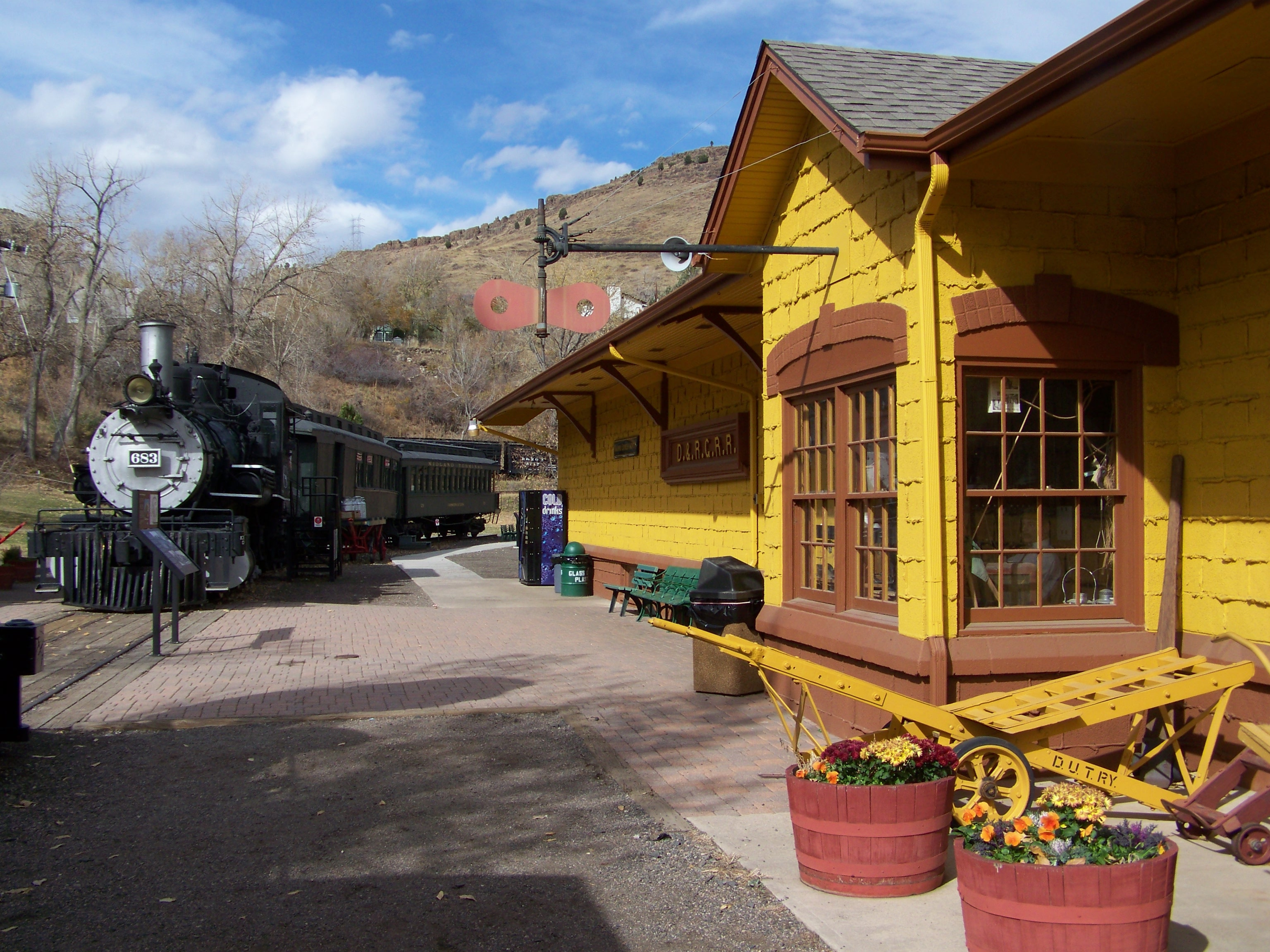
Main museum building

The museum building is a replica of an 1880s-style railroad depot. Exhibits feature original photographs by pioneer photographers such as William Henry Jackson and Louis Charles McClure, as well as paintings by Howard L Fogg, Otto Kuhler, Ted Rose and other artists. Locomotives and railroad cars modeled in the one inch scale by Herb Votaw are also displayed. A bay window contains a reconstructed depot telegrapher's office, complete with a working telegraph sounder.

The lower level of the museum building contains an exhibition hall which features seasonal and traveling displays on railroading history. The lower level also contains the Denver HO Model Railroad Club's "Denver and Western" operating HO and HOn3 scale model train layout that represent Colorado's rail history in miniature.

The Robert W. Richardson Library houses over 10,000 rare historic photographs, along with other reference materials such as timetables, maps, employee records and engineering documents about Colorado railroads.

== Collection ==
The museum has a large collection of 3 ft (914 mm) narrow-gauge rolling stock and provides narrow-gauge train rides on special event days known as "Steam Up days".

The museum also has ex-Denver and Rio Grande Western Railroad No. 683, a coal-burning 2-8-0 "Consolidation" type steam locomotive built by the Baldwin Locomotive Works in 1890, builders number 11207. It is the only surviving 4 ft 8 1/2 in (1,435 mm) standard gauge steam locomotive from the Denver & Rio Grande Western Railroad.

All of the railroad equipment is displayed outdoors. Display tracks are complete with a rare three-way stub switch, dual gauge track and switches and century-old switch stands. These tracks hold over 100 historic narrow and standard gauge locomotives and cars. The 1/3 mile (0.54 km) oval of 3 ft (914 mm) gauge track is used by trains on operating days.

The museum's roster contains the following notable pieces of rolling stock:

=== Steam locomotives ===
Name	Year built	Status	Description
Chicago, Burlington and Quincy Railroad No. 5629	1940	Display	Chicago, Burlington & Quincy or Burlington Route No. 5629 is a 4-8-4 "Northern" type O-5B class standard gauge, oil-fired, steam locomotive built by the railroad in their West Burlington, Iowa shops. Retired in 1956 in Lincoln, Nebraska, the locomotive came to the Colorado Railroad Museum in 1963, and remains the largest steam locomotive in the museum. It is one of four surviving Burlington Route Northerns.
Denver and Rio Grande Western No. 491	1928	Operational	Denver & Rio Grande Western Railroad No. 491 is a 2-8-2 Rio Grande class K-37 "Mikado" type narrow-gauge steam locomotive, one of 10 built by the D&RGW itself at its Burnham shops in Denver. It was placed on display at the Colorado Railroad Museum in 2000. It was then restored to operating condition in August 2014. No. 491 is still currently operational at the museum as of 2022.
Denver and Rio Grande Western No. 346	July 1881	Out of Service	D&RGW No. 346 (originally numbered D&RG 406) is a Rio Grande class C-19 2-8-0 "Consolidation" type narrow-gauge steam locomotive built by the Baldwin Locomotive Works of Philadelphia, Pennsylvania. No. 346 is currently undergoing a rebuild as of 2022.
Denver and Rio Grande Western No. 318	1896	Display	D&RGW No. 318 is a 2-8-0 "Consolidation" type narrow-gauge steam locomotive built by Baldwin. Built for the Florence and Cripple Creek Railroad as #8 "Goldfield", sold to the D&RG in 1917 as their No. 428, and later renumbered as 318 in 1921.
Manitou and Pikes Peak Cog Railway No. 1	1890	Display	Manitou and Pikes Peak Cog Railway No. 1 is a 0-4-2 cog railway steam locomotive built by Baldwin. Originally named "John Hulbert", No. 1 operated on the Pikes Peak Cog Railway from 1891 into the 1960s. No. 1 was rebuilt as a Vauclain compound and numbered #1 in 3/1893.
Rio Grande Southern No. 20	1899	Operational	Rio Grande Southern No. 20 is a 4-6-0 "Ten Wheeler" type narrow-gauge steam locomotive built by the Schenectady Locomotive Works of Schenectady, New York. This locomotive has recently been restored to operating condition as of 2021. No. 20 made its first run under its own power for the first time on July 2, 2020, and made its public debut at the Colorado Railroad Museum on August 1, 2020. No. 20 is currently operational as of May 2022.
Denver Leadville & Gunnison No. 191	1880	Display	Denver Leadville & Gunnison No. 191 is a 2-8-0 "Consolidation" type narrow-gauge steam locomotive built by Baldwin Locomotive Works. Originally built as Denver, South Park and Pacific Railroad No. 51, renumbered No. 191 with the DSP&P's subsequent reorganization into the Denver, Leadville and Gunnison Railroad, renumbered again to No. 31 on the Colorado and Southern Railway, and was later sold to the Edward Hines Lumber Company, and again to A. A. Bigelow Lumber Co. of Washburn, Wisconsin, where it was purchased in 1904 by the Robbins Railroad Company, operating as Thunder Lake Lumber Company No. 7. No. 191 was purchased by the Colorado Railroad Museum in 1973 and returned to its home state, later receiving a cosmetic restoration for public display. Currently lettered for the Denver Leadville & Gunnison Railroad, No. 191 is the oldest locomotive in the state of Colorado.
Denver & Rio Grande Western No. 683	1890	Display	D&RGW No. 683 is a 2-8-0 "Consolidation" type standard gauge steam Locomotive. No. 683 entered service as the Rio Grande completed its very first standard gauge line between Denver and Salt Lake City. It was retired in 1955 and is the last surviving standard gauge locomotive from the Denver and Rio Grande Western.
Denver & Rio Grande Western 315	1895	Operational, On loan from DRHS	D&RGW No. 315 is a C-18 class 2-8-0 "Consolidation" type narrow-gauge steam locomotive that was originally built for the Florence and Cripple Creek Railroad by the Baldwin Locomotive Works in 1895 as number 425. It was purchased by the Denver and Rio Grande Railroad (D&RG) in 1917 and later became known as No. 315. It was retired in 1949 and had been on display at City of Durango parks until the Durango Railroad Historical Society restored the locomotive from 2001 to August 2007. On loan to the CRRM to help power the Polar Express Train Ride while 20 is in Durango, expected to stay in golden until at least May, 2026 to participate in events in Golden.

=== Diesel locomotives ===
- Denver & Rio Grande Western Davenport Locomotive Works 0-4-0 No. 50
- Denver & Rio Grande Western F9A No. 5771 & F9B No. 5762
- Denver & Rio Grande Western GP30 No. 3011
- Denver & Rio Grande Western SD40T-2 No. 5401. Donated to the museum in 2018.

=== Passenger cars ===
- Atchison Topeka & Santa Fe Observation car Navajo
- Chicago Burlington & Quincy Business Car No. 96
- Chicago, Burlington & Qunicy dome coach No. 4720 Silver Rifle
- Colorado Midland Observation car No. 111
- Denver & Rio Grande Western Coach No. 284
- Denver & Rio Grande Western Railway Post Office Car No. 60
- Union Pacific Coach No. 5442
- Union Pacific Dining car No. 4801
- Uintah Railway Combination Coach No. 50

=== Special equipment ===
- Chicago Burlington & Quincy snow plow No. 205065
- Colorado & Southern Rotary snowplow No. 99201
- Rio Grande Southern "Galloping Goose" No. 2
- Rio Grande Southern "Galloping Goose" No. 6
- Rio Grande Southern "Galloping Goose" No. 7

== See also ==
- List of heritage railroads in the United States
