= Rio Grande Southern Railroad =

Former narrow-gauge railway in Colorado, US

Overview
- Headquarters: Ridgway
- Reporting mark: R.G.S.
- Locale: Colorado
- Dates of operation: 1889–1953

Technical
- Track gauge: 3 ft (914 mm)
- Length: 161.8 Miles (260.3919 km)

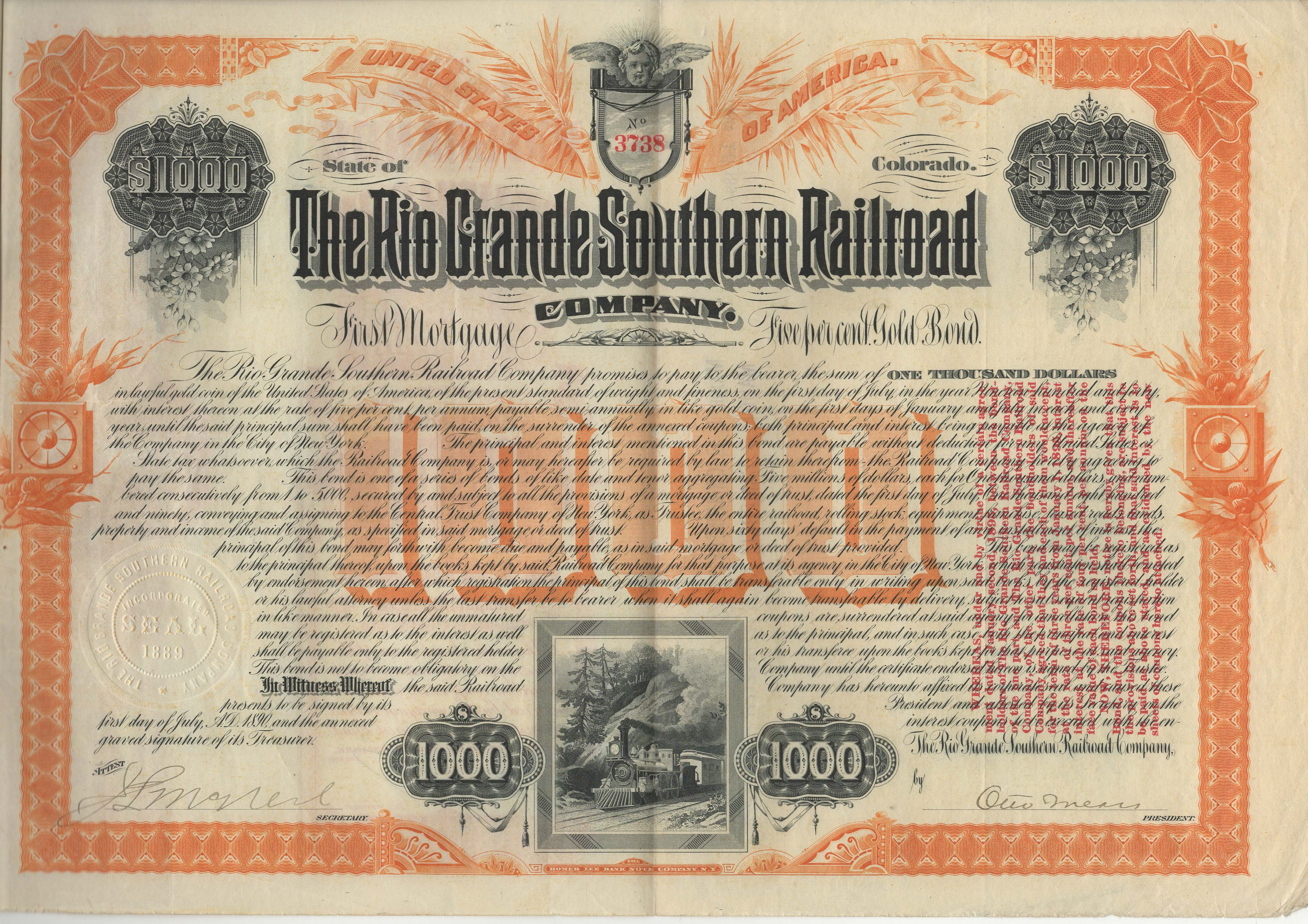
Gold Bond of the Rio Grande Southern Railroad, issued 1. July 1890

The Rio Grande Southern Railroad (reporting mark RGS, also referred to as "The Southern") was a 3 ft (914 mm) narrow-gauge railroad which ran in the southwestern region of the US state of Colorado, from the towns of Durango to Ridgway, routed via Lizard Head Pass. Built by German immigrant and Colorado toll road builder Otto Mears, the RGS operated from 1891 through 1951 and was built with the intent to transport immense amounts of silver mineral traffic that were being produced by the mining communities of Rico and Telluride. On both ends of the railroad, there were interchanges with The Denver and Rio Grande Railroad (reporting mark D&RG(W), later known as the Denver and Rio Grande Western), which would ship the traffic the RGS hauled elsewhere like the San Juan Smelter in Durango.

For the first few years of its life, the RGS would have fallen under the definition of a "Bonanza Railroad" which meant it was an instant success, quickly generating more than enough money for the investors and covering costs spent to build the railroad, but their wealth would not last long due to the Silver Panic of 1893, which would permanently cripple the railroad's finances.

The RGS closed down and was dismantled in 1952–1953, but it is well known as one of the most rugged and iconic narrow-gauge mountain railroads in the history of Colorado.

== History ==
=== Background ===
The D&RG had built a narrow-gauge route from Denver in 1870, making its way to the Animas Valley from the town of Alamosa (Known as the San Juan Extension) and establishing the city of Durango in 1881, and then built to the town of Silverton in 1882. The D&RG would later build a route from Salida to Montrose, and then south to where they established the town of Ridgway (named after D&RG superintendent Robert M. Ridgway) and reached the mining town of Ouray in 1887. The D&RG had surveyed possible routes to access the town of Rico and connect the Ouray branch, one that branched off of the Silverton Branch at Hermosa and another route that Otto Mears' Silverton Railroad would eventually be constructed on, but as far as the D&RG was concerned, both routes were deemed as too formidable for a railroad line to be constructed. It was Otto Mears who decided to take on the task of connecting the D&RG's rail lines that were separated North and South of the central San Juans, and he had been on good terms with the D&RG from building the roadbed for their route to Gunnison, over Poncha and Marshall Pass.

=== The Silverton Railroad ===
Mears' first attempt at doing just that was the Silverton Railroad (reporting mark SRR), which went northwest of Silverton utilizing the survey done by the D&RG, mostly following the route of today's US 550 (also known as the Million Dollar Highway) over Red Mountain Pass. With the help of locating engineer Charles Wingate Gibbs, Mears managed to build the SRR to Ironton, which made it within 8 miles (12.9 km) of Ouray. However, the remaining stretch through the Uncompahgre Gorge to Ouray was considered too difficult, despite the efforts and engineering feats that had been already accomplished by Mears and Gibbs to get the SRR to Ironton in the first place. A cog railway was briefly considered as well as a spiraling tunnel, but the two ideas never made it out of the hypothetical realm. The SRR was able to profit from the also immense mineral traffic coming from the Red Mountain Mining District, but the Silver Panic of 1893 did not do any good to the Railroad, and eventually, the SRR was shut down and removed in 1926.

=== Formation ===
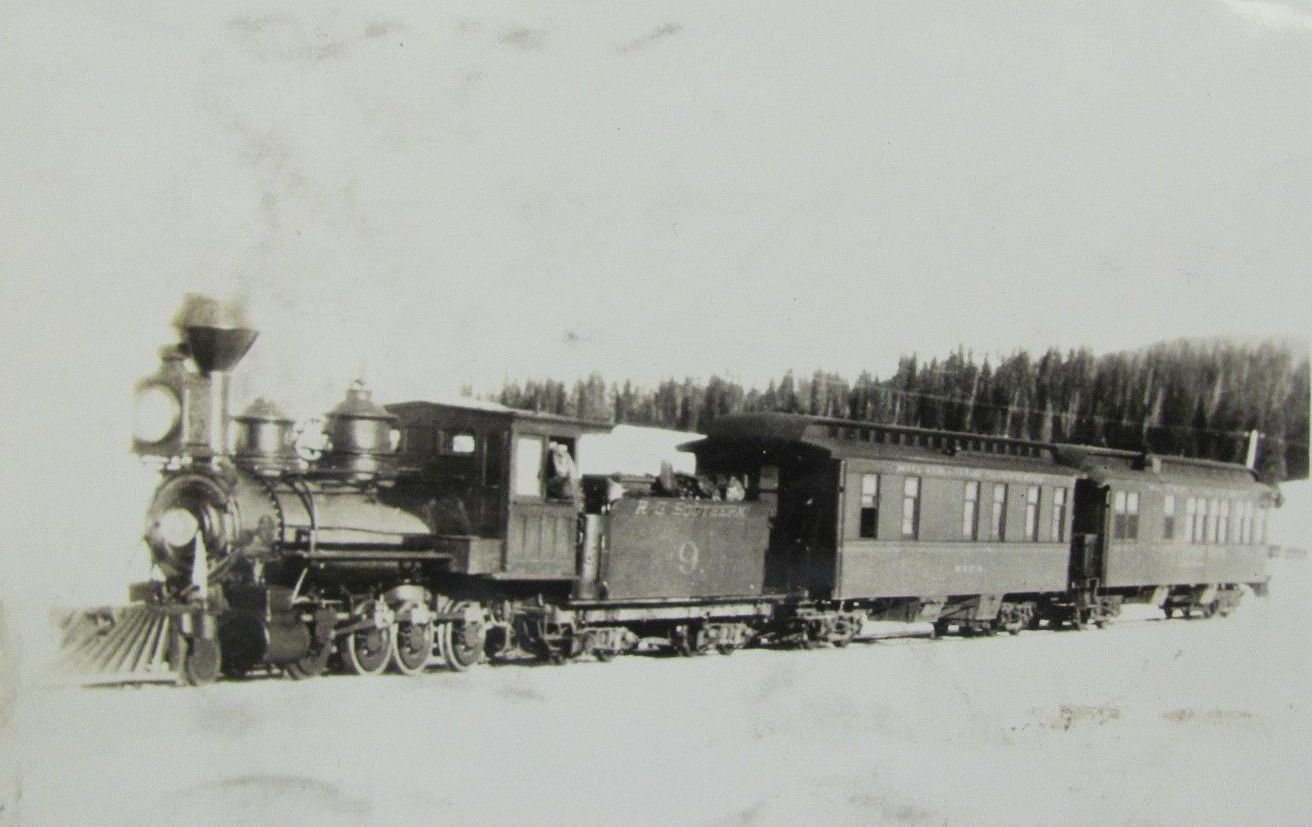
RGS C-16 #9, probably somewhere on Lizard Head Pass

Once it was apparent to Mears that the Silverton Railroad would not be able to access Ouray, he considered a Railroad route heading west of Durango. It would head north following Lost Creek and the Dolores River, accessing the mining community of Rico, then over Lizard Head Pass, following the San Miguel River up to the Dallas Divide, and then into the town of Ridgway. This route would essentially bypass the issues that kept the SRR from completing the line from Ouray and the need for various switchbacks and wyes the SRR required to traverse Red Mountain Pass. So in 1889, he incorporated the Rio Grande Southern. Construction began that year from both Ridgway and Durango. By the end of 1890, before the line was complete, the RGS was already servicing mining companies in Telluride and west of Durango. One of these was the Porter Coal Mine, built by John Porter, who had started other coal mines throughout the Durango Area to fuel the Durango Smelter/San Juan Smelter that he had built as well. The line was completed on 12 December 1891, where the two construction teams met south of Rico. Then the RGS was booming, profitable for the company and investors, and producing higher than average pay for RGS employees. This only lasted for a year and a half, however, as the Silver Panic of 1893 had resulted in most of the mines the railroad serviced closing overnight, and the railroad lost most of its traffic. This would severely affect the finances of the RGS, and the railroad was never able to fully recover from this and it created many characteristics the RGS is known for today. In August 1893, the RGS requested a voluntary receivership, which was received by Edward Turner Jeffery of the D&RG. Otto Mears had lost control of his railroad, and the D&RG was now in charge. By 1895 the receivership had ended, but Ed Jeffery was appointed president, still ensuring D&RG's control of the line. Later on, the RGS was able to pursue other kinds of traffic, such as lumber/logging, livestock, as well as different types of mineral traffic.

=== Difficulties ===
As the railroad attempted to recover from the panic of 1893 slowly, other issues had to be dealt with regarding natural occurrences. The railroad's route followed the Dolores River, which tended to flood many times during the railroad's lifetime. Most of the terrain it went through experienced tons of snow in winter and occasional rock and mudslides in summer. The RGS was able to order two new rotary snowplows specifically for the railroad before the Panic of 1893 and later on built three(?) plow flangers. Still, depending on how bad the snow got, it often caused closures, and the cost to operate trains with their plow equipment was too much for the railroad during specific times as they required two to four locomotives to push them. Many bridges and trestles would be washed out when rivers flooded over, adding more costs to railroad maintenance and closures.

=== Galloping Goose railcars ===
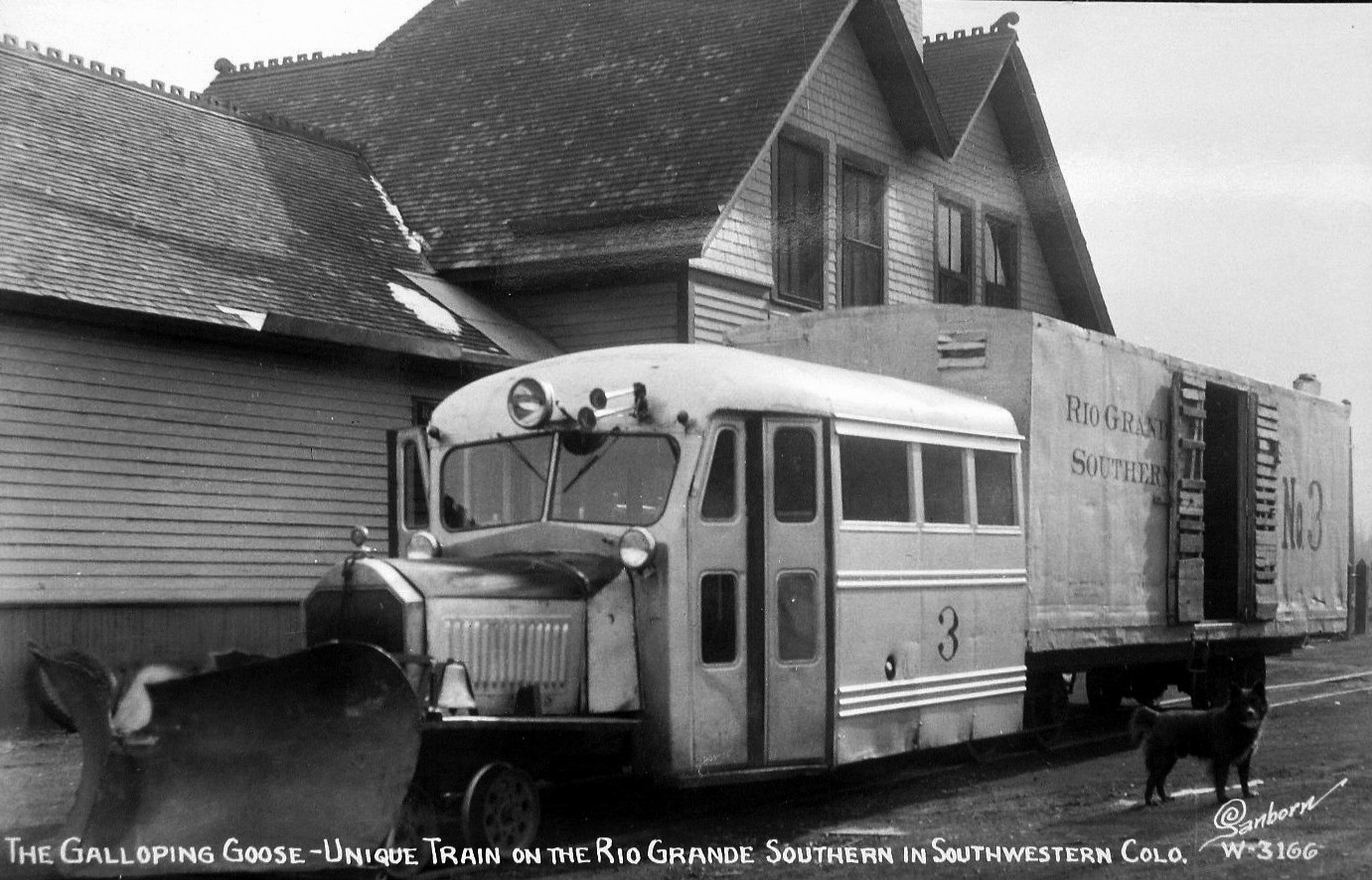
Goose #3 in front of what looks to be the Ridgway Depot, 1949

The Great Depression of 1929 heavily affected the RGS, to the point where the railroad could not afford to operate one single steam locomotive (Paying for Fuel, Paying the Engineer and Fireman to operate the locomotive, etc.). However, they still had the responsibility to ship US Mail, and in 1931, Chief Mechanic Jack Odenbaugh devised a way to construct seven homemade "railcars" that would be cheap to build and operate, capable of transporting US mail and a few passengers. The official names given from the RGS were "Motors", but these railcars would later be unofficially named "Galloping Geese" by Railfans because of how they looked, operated, and sounded.- Waddling down the poorly maintained, unlevel RGS tracks with a silver-painted body and hood covers that looked like goose wings when opened up to prevent the motor from over-heating, and the horn sounding somewhat like a honking goose. These railcars are arguably one of the most iconic aspects of the RGS and are known by most narrow-gauge railfans. The first Goose (RGS Motor #1) was built from a recycled Buick body, frame, and engine, and #2 would be as well, but with a larger and enclosed freight compartment, a requirement to haul US mail. Motors #3 through #5 and #7 were built from Pierce Arrow bodies, but with freight compartments the size of a boxcar. Motor #6 was made from a Buick as well, but it was designated for Maintenance of Way service, and only had a flatbed attached behind the cab. Later on, Motors #3 through #5 would receive replacement Wayne bus bodies. These motor cars indeed were successful and handled daily services until 1940 when the RGS could afford to run regular freight trains. Even after that, the Geese completely replaced revenue-generating passenger trains until abandonment; almost all passenger coaches the RGS owned at the time had been put into MOW service since.

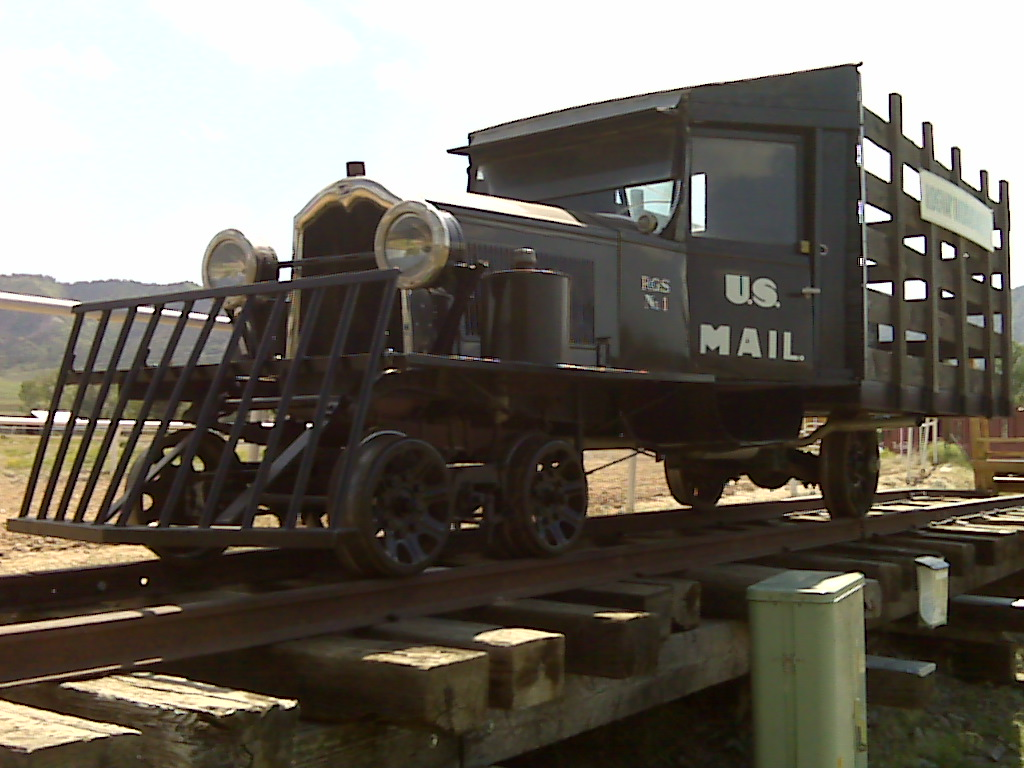
The RGS Motor #1 Replica seen in Ridgway

RGS Motor Roster:
Motor/Goose	Built	Type	Disposition
#1	1931	Buick, Open Air Freight Compartment, later temporarily enclosed	Scrapped 1933; replica built in 2000
#1 Replica	2000	Buick, Open Air Freight Compartment	Operational at the Ridgway Railroad Museum
#2	1931	Buick, Enclosed Freight Compartment	Operational at the Colorado Railroad Museum
#3	1932	Originally a Pierce-Arrow body, replaced with Wayne Bus Body, Long Freight Compartment, converted to larger passenger seating	Operational at Knotts Berry Farm
#4	1932	Originally a Pierce-Arrow body, replaced with Wayne Bus Body, Long Freight Compartment, converted to larger passenger seating	Restored by the Ridgway Railroad Museum, on display in Telluride, Colorado
#5	1933	Originally a Pierce-Arrow body, replaced with Wayne Bus Body, Long Freight Compartment, converted to larger Passenger Seating	Operational, on Display at Dolores, Colorado
#6	1934	Buick, MOW Service, Flatbed	Operational at the Colorado Railroad Museum
#7	1936	Pierce Arrow, Long Freight Compartment	Operational at the Colorado Railroad Museum

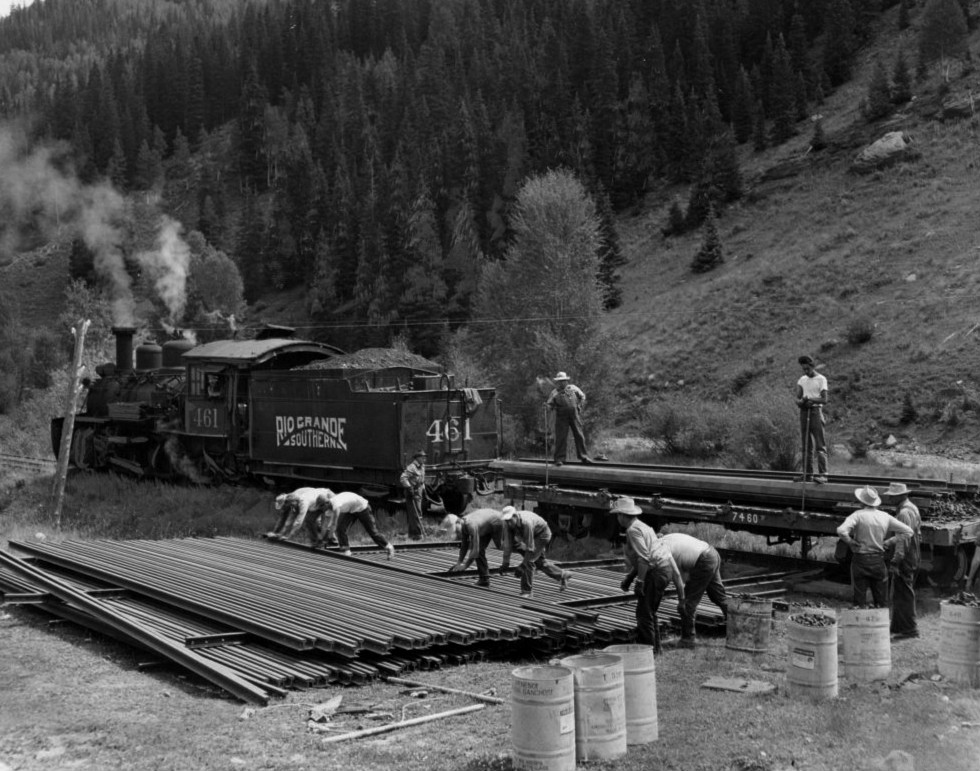
Ex-D&RGW K-27 #461 assisting with scrapping operations, circa 1952

=== Demise ===
The RGS filed with the Interstate Commerce Commission for abandonment on 24 April 1952, after 60 years of operation. The RGS had lost the contract to ship US mail after failing to clear snow to deliver during the winter of 1951–52. This contract was the very last profitable aspect of the RGS. Scrapping operations started after the request for abandonment was approved in April and was completed by March 21st, 1953. Remaining operational equipment such as RGS C-17 #42 on the south end of the line and D&RGW K-27 #461 on the north end as well as various Motors/Geese were used to salvage the rails and other parts of the railroad that were removed.

Most of the RGS equipment had been abandoned, sold, or scrapped. The RGS had many locomotives regardless of whether they were leased or owned, but many were eventually cannibalized for parts that went to similar locomotives of the same class and then scrapped. The RGS was always having financial issues and was usually more than willing to sell worn out or excess locomotives and rolling stock hardware to the scrappers to stay afloat. The D&RGW had to perform similar practices during the Great Depression, causing many typical classes of RGS and D&RG locomotives to almost go extinct.

== Route ==
=== The Main Line ===
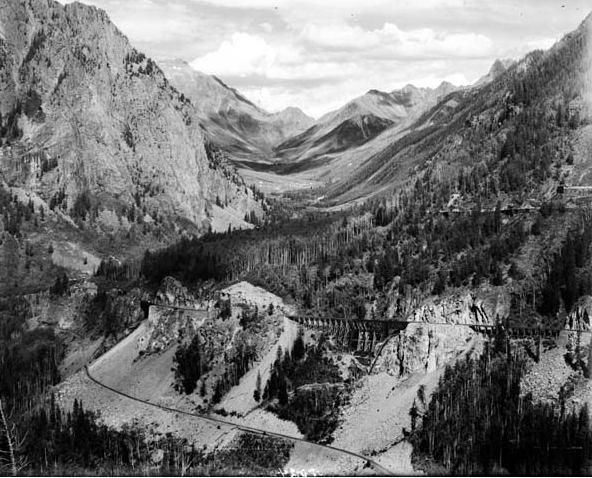
The "Ophir Loop", circa 1910. The tracks above led to Rico, the tracks below lead to Vance Junction.

From the Railroad's headquarters and where the main facilities were in Ridgway, the railroad traversed northwest to the Dallas Divide and then headed southwest following near the present-day Route 62, heading down to the townsite of Placerville. It then continued south toward Telluride following the San Miguel River, to what was called Vance Junction (west of Telluride), where one of two coal topples were located. It then continued southeast, curving around up the side of Yellow Mountain to the Townsite of Ophir with the help of numerous, large trestle bridges. It then looped around to the southwest and continued up the side of Yellow Mountain to Trout Lake, curving around it to the Summit of Lizard Head Pass. It then continued southeast, where it met the Dolores River and looped around it heading southwest into the town of Rico. Rico was considered the center of the Railroad and had some notable engine facilities. From Rico, it followed the Dolores River west into the town of Dolores, where it then curved southeast into Lost Canyon. It followed Lost Creek, and eventually exited the canyon to make its way directly south into the town of Mancos. From Mancos, it traversed east following the East Mancos Creek up Mancos Hill, and then down Cima Hill to the townsite of Hesperus. Then it curved south, passing by Ute Junction, the second coal topple on the line. It then looped back around the east, near the original Fort Lewis campus, heading northeast into Wild Cat Canyon. In the canyon, it passed by the townsite of Porter and the site of the Porter Coal mine, making its way north to Franklin Junction. It then curved east and finally ended close to the San Juan Smelter, where it met up with the D&RGW's San Juan Extension.

=== Branch Lines ===
The RGS had numerous small industry spurs servicing mines and other types of freight traffic, but there were at least four notable branch lines that branched off of the RGS Mainline.

==== Telluride Branch ====
As the name implies, the Telluride branch was a branch line that branched off from Vance Junction facing south and curved around to the north. It then went east into the Downtown Telluride Area. It then extended past Telluride to what was known as Pandora to service more mines in the area.

==== Montezuma Lumber Company ====
The Montezuma Lumber Company operated a railroad line that branched off the RGS Main in a few different places in Dolores. Much information about this railroad is hard to come by if not lost to history. Still, common knowledge suggests that it ran north of Dolores and through where the McPhee Reservoir is now located to transport logs and other resources to the large logging operations in the area.

==== Boston Coal & Fuel Company Railroad ====
The BC&F Railroad was built by George Franklin's Boston Coal mine in 1901. The mine was located on the southwest side of Durango's Perins Peak, and George was interested in building a railroad line to service it. The BC&F Railroad branched off the RGS main at Franklin Junction (presumably named after him) and curved its way 5 and 1/2 miles up the hillside to the mine. The mine had purchased RGS Locomotive No. 35, and renumbered and re-lettered it to BC&F No. 1. The railroad spur started operation on 25 November, of that year, and was noted often pulling seven gondolas down to Franklin Junction and back three times a day. The spur and locomotive were leased to the RGS in 1925, and eventually, the mine ceased operations in 1927. The BC&F Railroad was dismantled later that year. The Franklin Junction site is now known as the Twin Buttes Subdivision, and the BC&F Grade is now a hiking trail.

==== Mayday Branch ====
The Mayday branch serviced the Mayday Mine, just west of Mayday, Colorado (north of Hesperus).

== Equipment ==
As the Rio Grande Southern was not a wealthy railroad for most of its life, the locomotives owned were all second (or more) hand, mostly from the D&RGW. Many RGS locomotives purchased were pretty old and heavily worn, some having been pulled from storage lines that were intended to hold locomotives prepared for scrap. Most of the RGS Rolling stock was leased from the D&RGW for frequent use between Durango and Ridgway. The RGS did however manage to have their own fleet of freight equipment (for a time) and passenger cars, as well as cabooses, all of which were purchased second hand from the defunct Rio Grande Western as well as the D&RG and had to be heavily overhauled. The RGS also managed to have their own snow fighting equipment as mentioned above, and of course, the Galloping Geese Railcars. Later on, they purchased some boxcars from the Colorado and Southern narrow-gauge railroad system for the last few years of the railroad's life.

=== Preserved locomotives ===
While the tracks of the Rio Grande Southern have been torn up, and the of the right of way reclaimed by nature, incorporated into state highway 145, or built over by more recent development, there are still many artifacts from the railroad that still exist today. This includes structures on or along the original right of way, along with equipment and rolling stock. The RGS had many different locomotives that ran on the line throughout its life, but with the exception of locomotives that were leased and the motors/geese, very few remain today.

Surviving steam locomotives that were owned by and/or leased to the Rio Grande Southern railroad:
Locomotive	Type	Disposition
RGS #20	Built for the F&CC as #20 in 1899 by the Schenectady Locomotive Works, a 4-6-0 Ten-wheeler. Sold to the RGS in 1915, Classed as a "T-19" Locomotive in 1921.	Purchased to by the Rocky Mountain Railroad Club in 1951, donated to the Colorado Railroad Museum, and restored from 2006 to 2020, now operational.
RGS #41	Built for the D&RG as #409 "Red Cliff" in 1881 by Baldwin, a 2-8-0 Consolidation Locomotive, Classed as a "Class 70" Locomotive. Sold to the RGS, and Renumbered to #41 in 1916. Classed as a "C-19" Locomotive in 1921.	Purchased by Walter Knott in 1951, Currently operational at the Ghost Town & Calico Railroad at Knotts Berry Farm, Buena Park, CA.
RGS #42	Built for the D&RG as #420 in 1887 by Baldwin, a 2-8-0 Consolidation Locomotive, Classed as a "Class 70" Locomotive. Sold to the RGS, and Renumbered to #42 in 1916, Classed as a "C-17" Locomotive in 1921.	Purchased by Robert Richardson in 1953 for the Narrow Gauge Motel in Alamosa. When the motel was moved to Golden, Colorado, and became the Colorado Railroad Museum, 42 was sold to Magic Mountain to fund the move of equipment to Golden. 42 was later sold to the D&SNG in 1989, and has been on Static Display in their Museum since.
D&RGW #168	Built for the D&RG in 1883 by Baldwin, a 4-6-0 Ten-wheeler, classed as a "Class 47" Locomotive. Classed as a "T-12" Locomotive in 1921. Leased to the RGS in 1891 to pull an inaugural train to celebrate the completion of the RGS, probably leased a few other times as well.	Put on display at the Antlers Park at Colorado Springs in 1939, leased to the C&TS in 2016 and restored in 2019, Currently Operational.
D&RGW #223	Built for the D&RG in 1881 by Grant, a 2-8-0 Consolidation Locomotive, classed as a "Class 60" locomotive. Leased to the RGS from 1907 to 1922. Classed as a "C-16" Locomotive in 1921.	Put on display at Salt Lake City in 1941. Undergoing a restoration since 1992.
D&RGW #315	Built for the F&CC as #3 "Elkton" in 1895 by Baldwin, a 2-8-0 Consolidation Locomotive. Sold to the D&RG in 1917 as #425 and classed as a "Class 72" Locomotive. Renumbered to #315 in 1921 and classed as a "C-18" Locomotive. Leased to the RGS from 1926 to 1927.	Put on display next to Durango Chamber of Commerce Building in 1950, moved to Santa Rita Park in 1990, restored by the Durango Railroad Historical Society from 2000 to 2007. In 2023-24, 315 has finished the rebuild and is operational at the C&TS.
D&RGW #340	Built for the D&RG as #400 "Green River" in 1881 by Baldwin, a 2-8-0 Consolidation Locomotive, classed as a "Class 70" Locomotive. Renumbered to #340 in 1921, and classed a "C-19" Locomotive. (Most likely leased to the RGS at one point in time?)	Purchased by Walter Knott in 1952, Currently Operational on the Ghost Town & Calico Railroad at Knotts Berry Farm in Buena Park, CA.
D&RGW #346	Built for the D&RG as #406 "Cumbres" in 1881 by Baldwin, a 2-8-0 Consolidation Locomotive, Classed as a "Class 70" Locomotive. Renumbered to #346 in 1921, and classed a "C-19" Locomotive. Leased to the RGS at one point in time, leased to the C&S from 1935 to 1937. Sold to the Montezuma Lumber Company railroad in 1947.	Purchased by Robert Richardson in 1950 for the Narrow Gauge Motel in Alamosa, later moved with the motel and the rest of the equipment to Golden, Colorado in 1959 and rebranded as the Colorado Railroad Museum. Previously operational, currently undergoing a rebuild.
D&RGW #463	Built for the D&RG in 1903 by Baldwin, a 2-8-2 Mikado Locomotive, Classed as a "Class 125" Locomotive. Classed as a "K-27" Locomotive in 1921. Leased to the RGS at some point in time.	Sold to Gene Autry in 1955, later donated to the town of Antonito, Colorado. Was restored in 1994 and is operated by the C&TS.
D&RGW #464	Built for the D&RG in 1903 by Baldwin, a 2-8-2 Mikado Locomotive, Classed as a "Class 125" Locomotive. Classed as a "K-27" Locomotive in 1921. Leased to the RGS at some point in time. Out of service from 1959 until sold to Walter Knott in 1973.	Purchased by Walter Knott in 1973, and was restored and operated to Knotts Berry Farm for a time. Later sold to the Huckleberry Railroad where it currently is out of service awaiting a rebuild.
C&S #74	Built for the Colorado & Northwestern Railroad by Brooks, (date???), sold to the C&S in (???), sold to the RGS in 1948.	Donated to the City of Boulder, Colorado, and put on display there, later moved to the Colorado Railroad Museum.

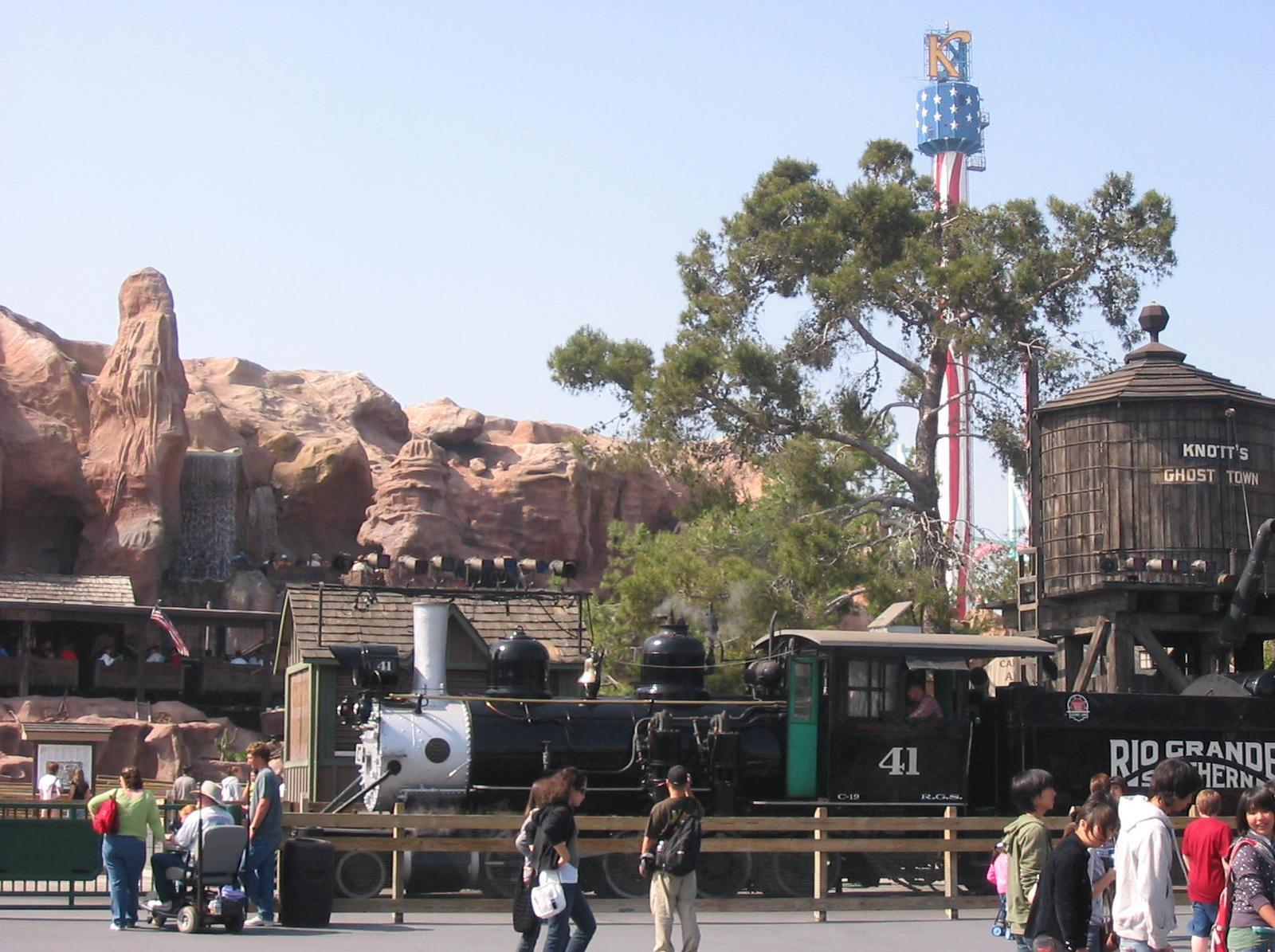
RGS C-19 #41 operating at Knotts Berry Farm

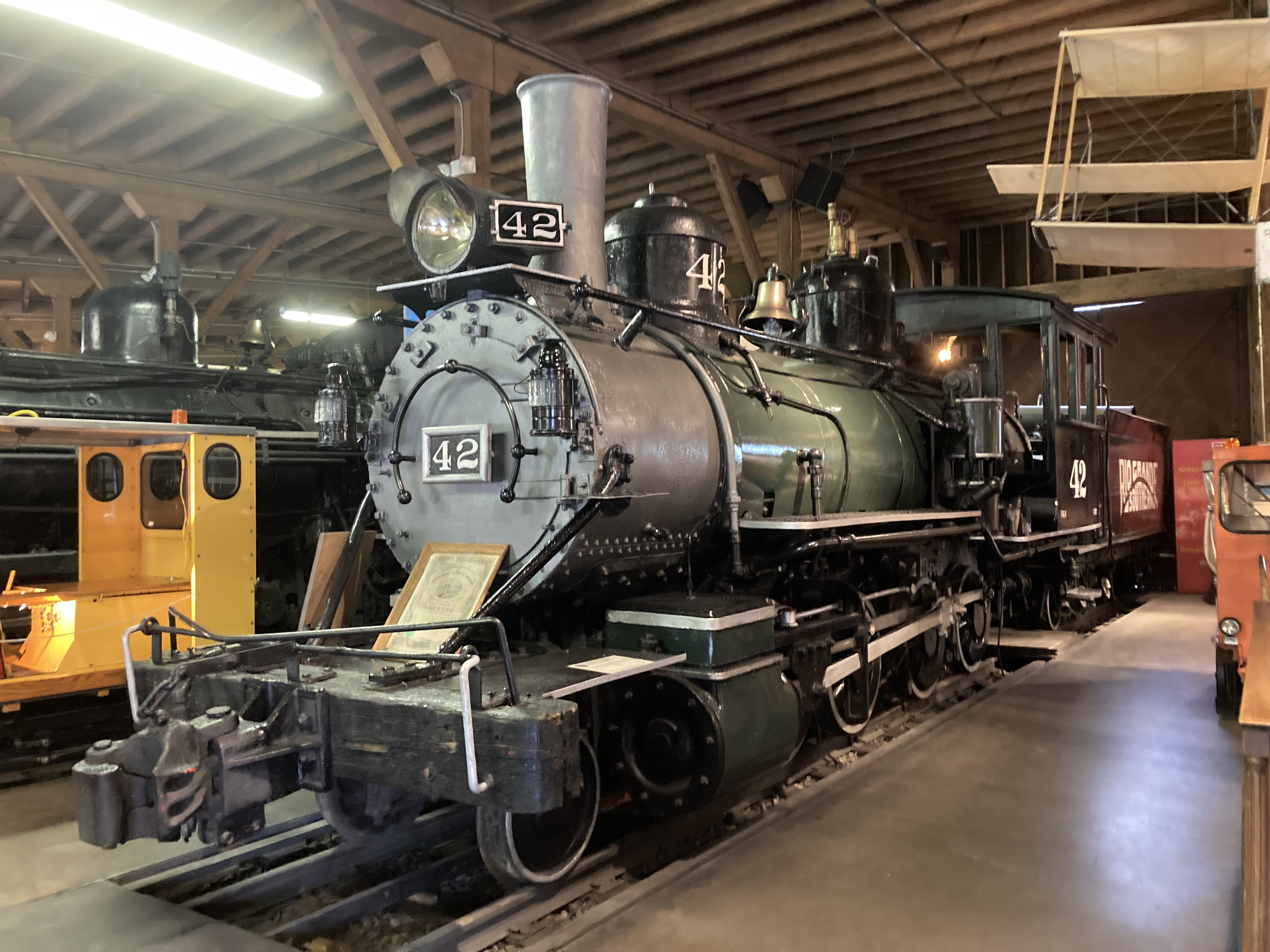
RGS C-17 #42 on display inside the D&SNG Museum

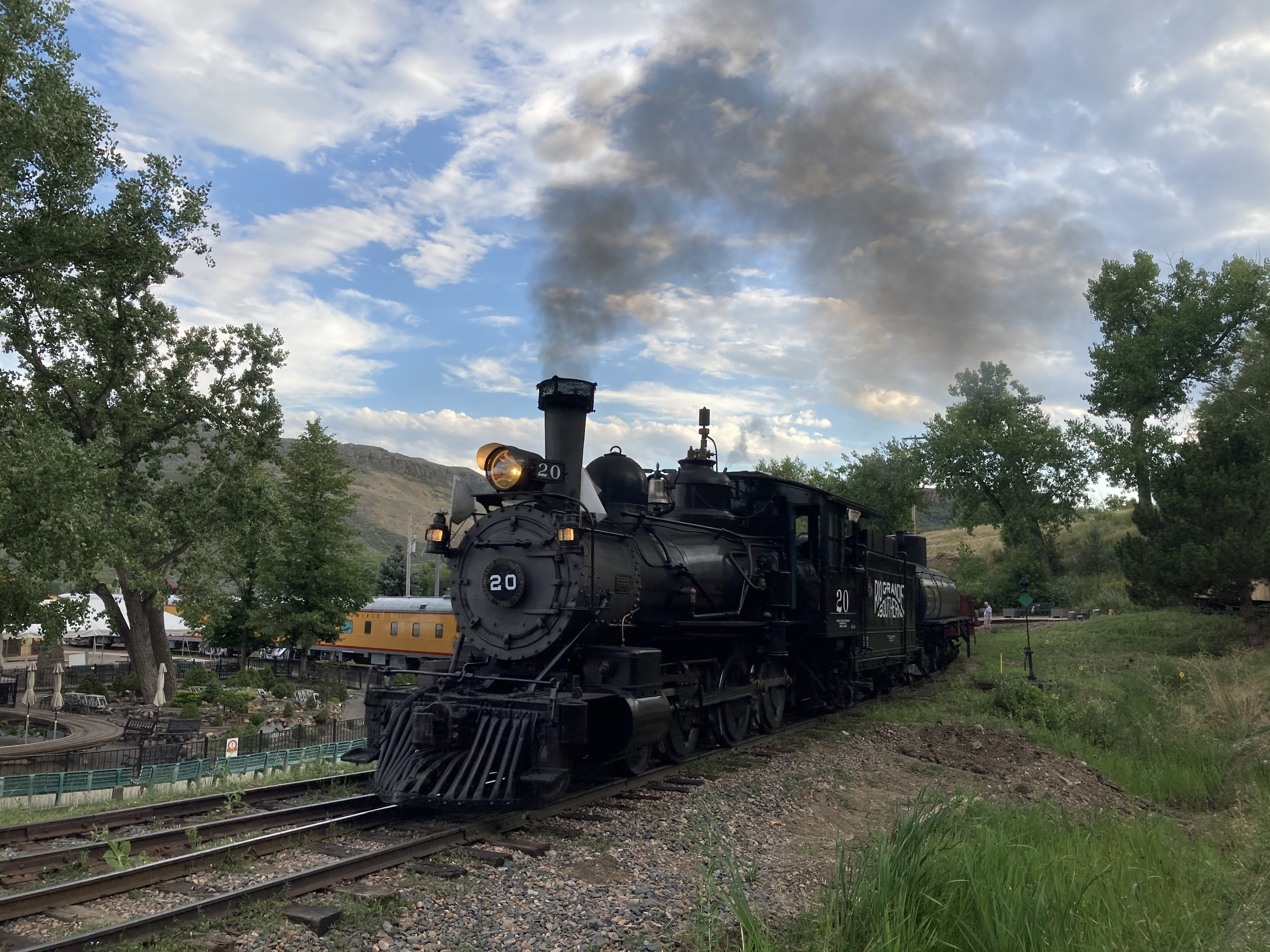
RGS T-19 #20 operating at the Colorado Railroad Museum

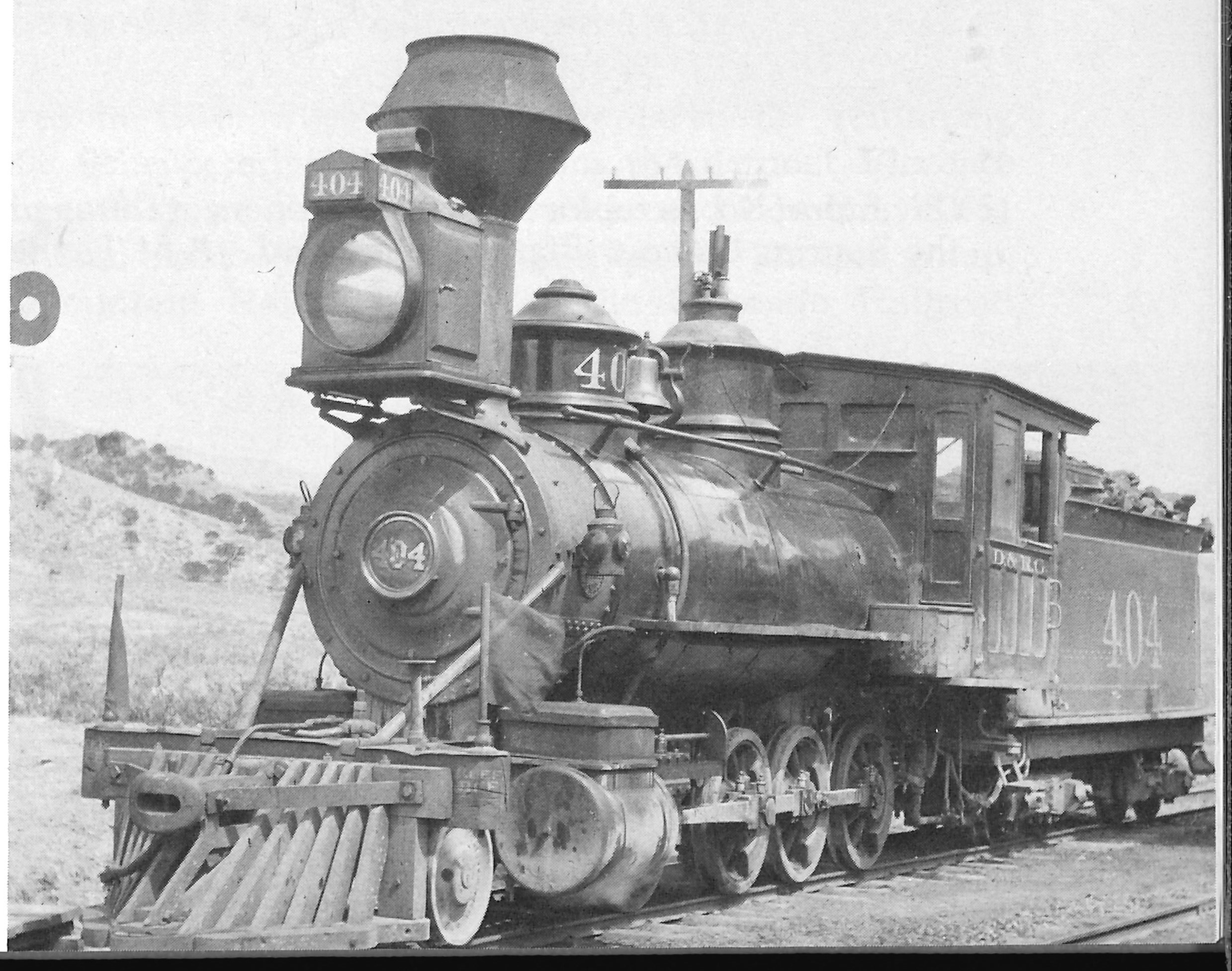
Denver & Rio Grande RR #404, 2-8-0, C-19. This photo shows what D&RG and RGS engines of this type (2-8-0) typically looked like in their original configurations, with diamond stack, box headlight, trim on the domes, and wooden pilot (cowcatcher). Photo courtesy Colorado Railroad Museum, Golden, Colorado.

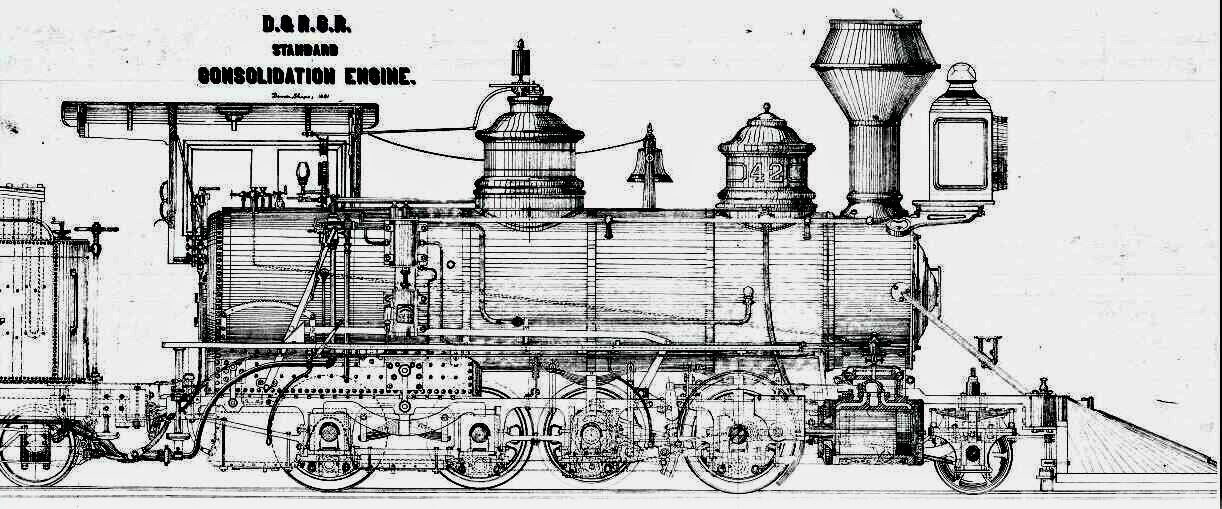
D&RG "Standard Consolidation Engine," 1881. A "consolidation" is a 2-8-0 wheel arrangement.

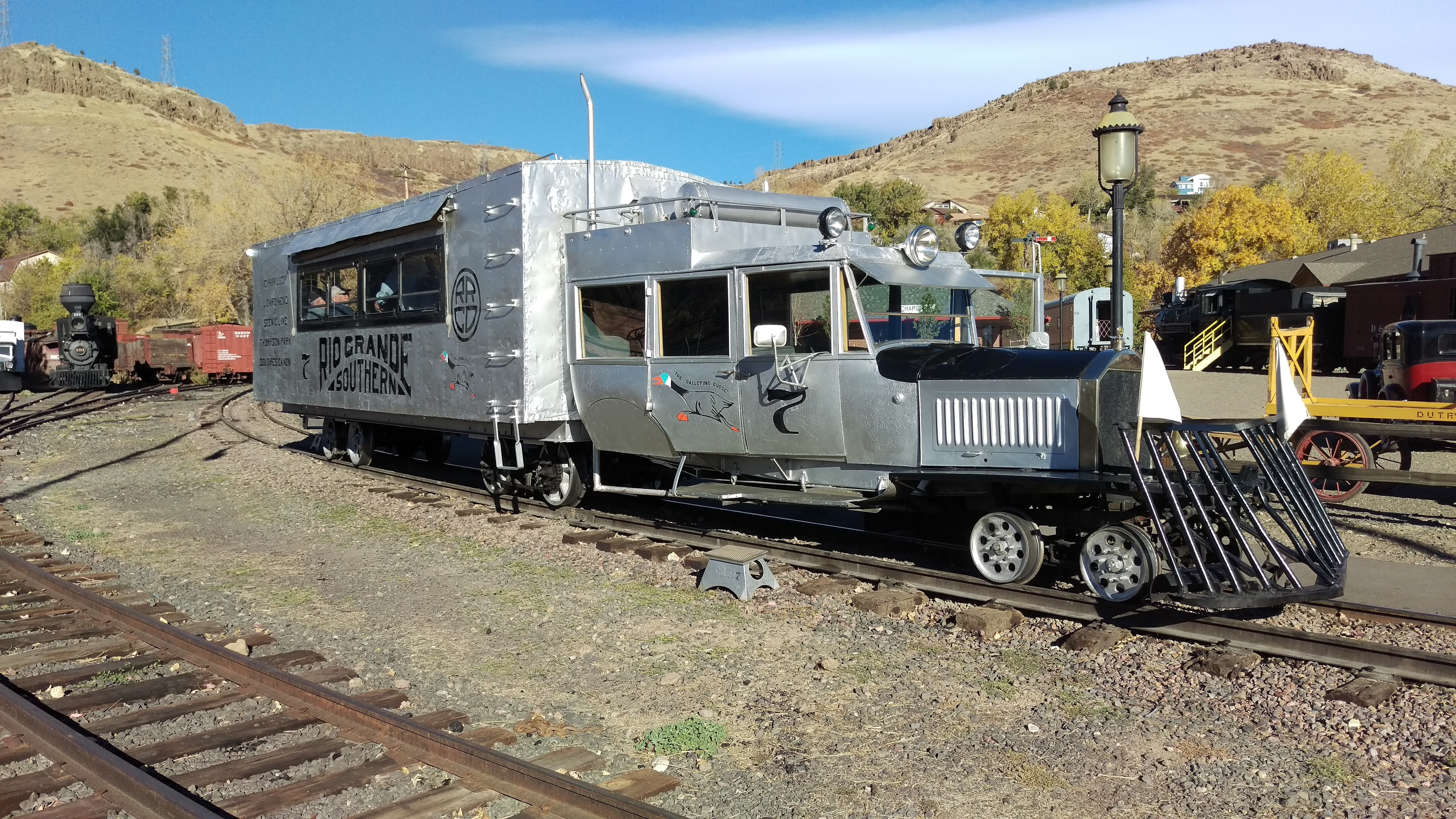
RGS Motor #7 Operating at the Colorado Railroad Museum

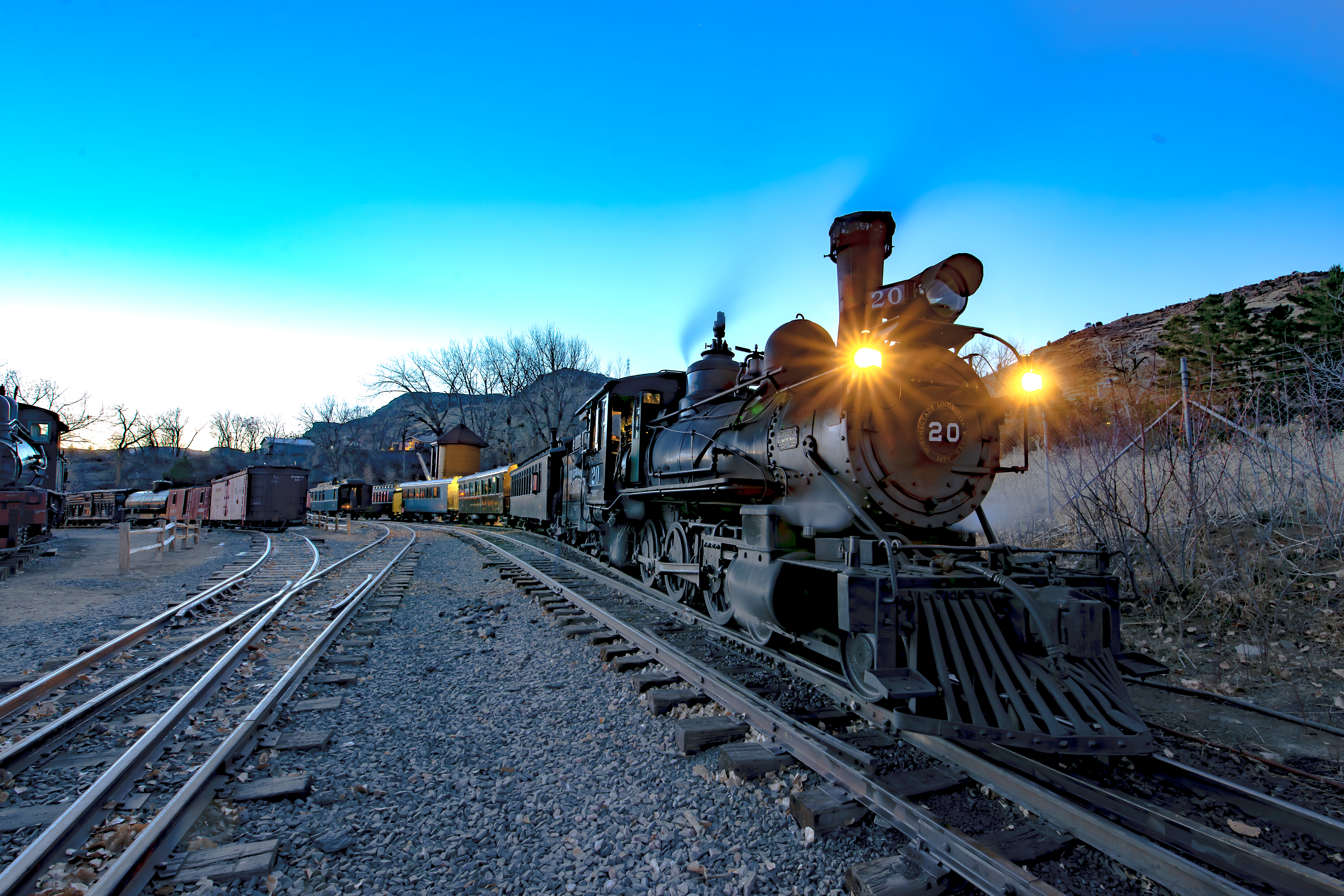
RGS #20 Steam Engine at the Colorado Railroad Museum

Today, much of the former D&RGW and RGS rolling stock has new life in tourism, at places such as the Huckleberry Railroad, Knott's Berry Farm, the Durango & Silverton Railroad, the Cumbres & Toltec Scenic Railroad, and the Colorado Railroad Museum.

The Ridgway Railroad Museum offers in-depth guided tours of the Rio Grande Southern right of way and remains, during their annual Railroad Days events in September, as well as guided hiking tours of the Silverton Railroad right of way.
