= Robert W. Richardson =

American historian

Robert W. Richardson (May 21, 1910, Rochester, Pennsylvania – February 23, 2007, Bellefonte, Pennsylvania) was an American writer and narrow gauge railway preservationist.

== Life ==
Robert W. Richardson was born on May 21, 1910, in Rochester, Pennsylvania. He moved with his parents to Akron, Ohio, in 1915, and attended high school there. As a teenager, he enjoyed watching and photographing trains in Ohio and Pennsylvania: his photographic archiving of soon-to-vanish railroads began in May 1931 when he borrowed a camera to record a day with the Ohio River & Western Railway near Key, Ohio. Diverted from a college education, he worked for a local hardware concern before starting his own small print shop. The Depression years were especially hard for printers, and his shop closed in 1937. A keen philatelist, he then worked for George Linn as the second editor of Linn's Weekly Stamp News.

Fortunately for rail hobbyists and historians, Richardson kept up his interest in railroad operations and history. Journeys to northwestern Pennsylvania during the 1930s and early 1940s took him to the Sheffield and Tionesta Railway, the Tionesta Valley Railway and the Clarion River Railway. Anticipating military service, he quit his job with Linn's. Subsequently, learning that he would not be called up for some time, he took a job as an advertising representative for the Seiberling Rubber Company, which required him to travel extensively through the southern states.

In the summer of 1941, Richardson and a friend came to Colorado for the first time, making an unforgettable circle tour on the narrow gauge. He became completely enamored of the slim gauge railroads of Colorado. After military service during World War II with the Army Signal Corps in Iran, where he studied the Persian railroads and learned to read Persian, he returned to his job with Seiberling, but made repeated vacation trips touring the Colorado's narrow gauge railroads in 1945, 1946 and 1947, eventually deciding to make his home there.

Quitting his job in 1948, Richardson and an Ohio friend pooled their resources to open the Narrow Gauge Motel in Alamosa. The grounds offered a fine place to display some of the narrow gauge equipment he had purchased, along with that saved by the Rocky Mountain Railroad Club. From 1948 to 1958 he sporadically published Narrow Gauge News, a newsletter which later became the Colorado Railroad Museum's Iron Horse News. At Alamosa, Bob Richardson tirelessly railed against the abandonment of the historic narrow gauge lines: his untiring efforts and the publicity he generated were among the primary reasons that the Silverton Train and the Cumbres and Toltec Scenic Railroad were preserved for future generations.

While in Alamosa, Richardson amassed a formidable collection of railroad artifacts and equipment, including famed D&RGW locomotive No. 346, which he purchased with his own funds in 1950. Then Cornelius W. Hauck, another prominent railroad enthusiast from Ohio, acquired D&RGW 2-8-0 No. 318 and placed it at the motel. Bob's friendship with "Corny" Hauck led to the establishment of the Colorado Railroad Museum in Golden. Purchase of the former farm just east of Golden was completed in 1958, and the museum was officially opened to the public in July 1959. Construction of the Iron Horse Motel next door was intended to be an additional source of operating revenue, but instead proved to be overly time-consuming and was sold. Several years down the road, the motel was purchased and razed to make way for the roundhouse restoration facility and to enable completion of a loop of narrow gauge track. Bob served as executive director of the Colorado Railroad Museum until 1991, when he decided to retire and move back to join family in Pennsylvania, where he had been raised. The Robert W. Richardson Railroad Library at the museum was created and named in his honor.

Richardson wrote for both Trains and Railroad magazines, and throughout his life published books chronicling narrow gauge railroads. It is no exaggeration to say that he did more than any other individual to preserve Colorado's unique railroad heritage. Robert W. Richardson died on February 23, 2007, in Bellefonte, Pennsylvania, at the age of 96.

== Works ==
- Chasing trains : the lifetime story of the founder of the Colorado Railroad Museum, 1995
