= Smelter Mountain =

Mountain in the USA

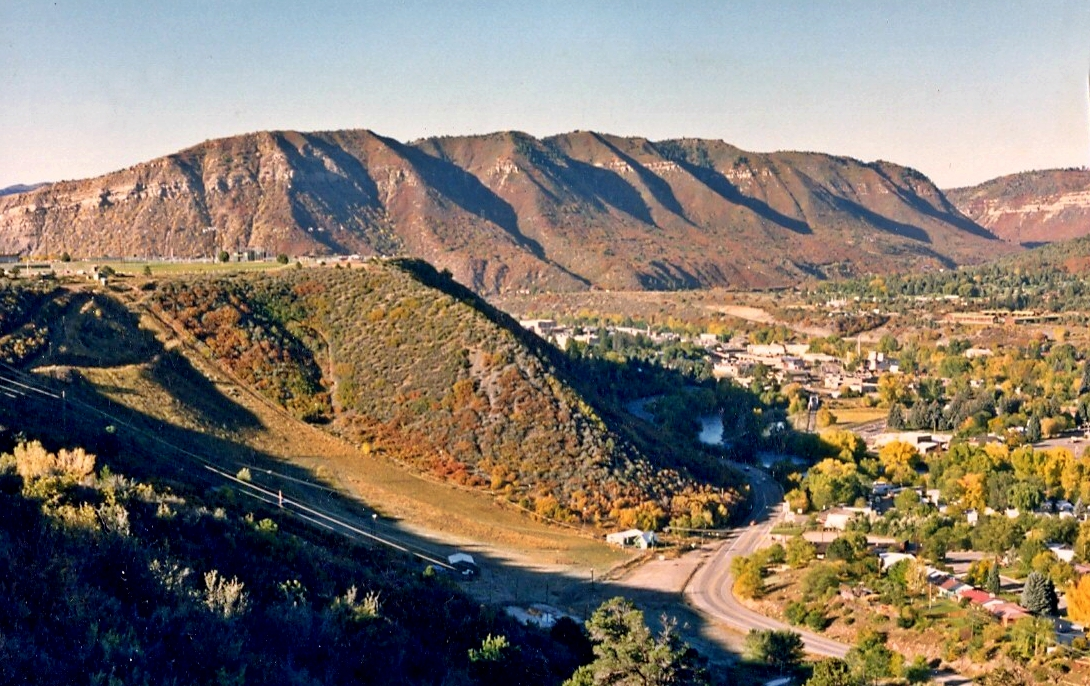
- Smelter Mountain seen from Rim Drive

Highest point
- Elevation: 7,725 ft (2,355 m)
- Prominence: 565 ft (172 m)
- Coordinates: 37°15′44″N 107°54′22″W

Geography
- Location within Colorado Location within the United States
- Location: La Plata County, Colorado, US
- Parent range: La Plata Mountains
- Topo map: USGS Durango West

Climbing
- Easiest route: Hiking trail

Smelter Mountain is part of the La Plata Mountains range which is a subset of the Rocky Mountains of North America. It is located in the Bodo State Wildlife Area, 1.2 miles (2 km) southwest of the downtown area of the community of Durango in La Plata County, Colorado, United States. Smelter Mountain rises over 1,200 ft (370 m) above the town, and the lower slope of the mountain was home to the Durango smelter, hence the name of the mountain. Precipitation runoff from Smelter Mountain drains into the Animas River and its tributaries, chiefly Lightner Creek. A 1.2 mile hiking trail leads to the summit, and other recreational activities include hunting and paragliding.
