= The Durango smelter =

Coordinates: 37.2653°N 107.8827°W

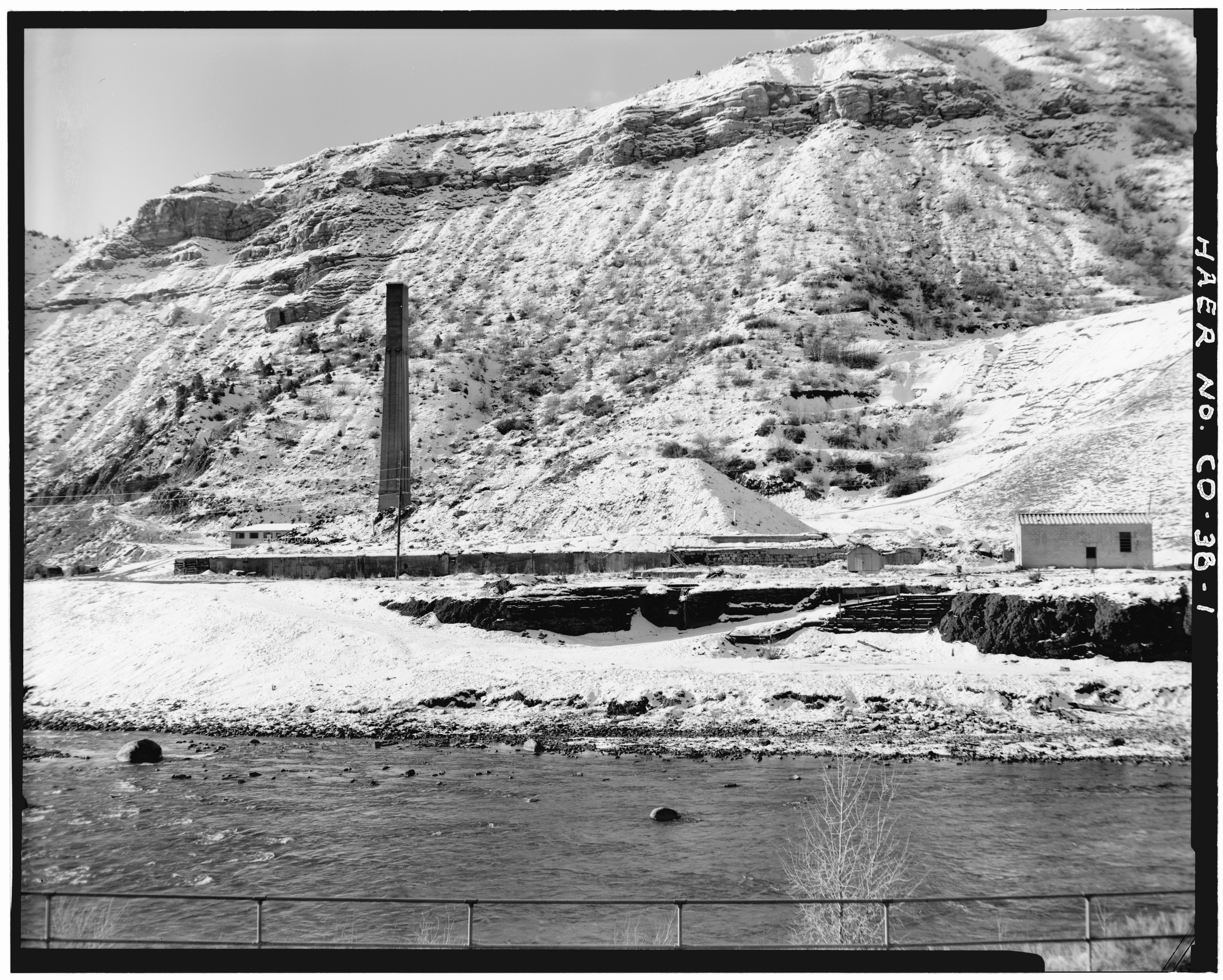
1968 view of the Durango Smelter site taken across the Animas River from the D&RGW Railroad yard (Now the site of US Highway 160/550)

The San Juan and New York Smelting Company, (later on merged into the American Smelting & Refining Company, but commonly referred to as the "Durango Smelter") was a mineral smelter located below Smelter Mountain right in front of Durango, Colorado, operating from 1882 to 1930, processing Coke, Lead, Copper, Silver, and Gold from mines all over La Plata County, San Juan County, and elsewhere in the Southwestern Colorado Region generally serviced by railroad. It was later reinstated during World War II by the U. S. Vanadium Corporation for production of large amounts of Uranium that would be utilized in the Manhattan Project. From 1963 on the smelter sat dormant until the U.S. Department of Energy cleaned up the site from 1985 to 1987 due to concerns regarding toxic mineral tailings/radioactive waste, as well as the Colorado Department of Public Health and Environment suing ASARCO (the successor to the American Smelting and Refining Company) or damages to natural resources in 1983. Today the site is now the City of Durango's dog park and also considered a popular local hike.

== History ==
John Porter, a mining engineer, first came to the Southwestern Colorado area in 1875. Age 30 at the time, the Connecticut-born metallurgist and smelterman established the Greene Smelter in Silverton, Colorado, but then moved on to Eureka, Nevada. In 1881 the Denver & Rio Grande Railroad had made its way into the Animas Valley with its eyes set on serving the mining district of Silverton. Once the railroad established the townsite of Durango, D&RG President William Jackson Palmer with his associate William Bell convinced Porter that Durango would be a more ideal location for a smelter and asked him to return to the area, in order to move the Greene smelter and operate the new smelter location in Durango under their recently incorporated San Juan and New York Smelting Company. Starting operations in 1882, the Durango Smelter prospered under Porter's management; by 1887 it smelted over $1 million in Silver, Lead, Gold and Copper.

John Porter would later go on to start other coal mines around the Durango area to help fuel the Smelter, under the name of his Porter Fuel Company, most notably the Porter Coal Mine, which was located west of Durango in Wild Cat Canyon. His company would later be purchased by the Union Pacific Coal Company on February 1, 1906, and moved the main offices to Omaha, Nebraska.

In 1888 the San Juan and New York Smelting Company had reorganized and leased the Durango Smelter to the Omaha and Grant Smelting and Refining Company. John Porter gave up his position as manager, although he retained a role as "executive adviser" for several years after. Later in 1899 the company had been merged with the American Smelting and Refining Company, operating it with lower production numbers into the 1920s and eventually closing the smelter down in 1930.

From 1903 to 1904 the Durango Smelter played a role in Colorado Labor Wars, when smelter workers went on strike. The strikes around Colorado helped influence Colorado Labor Laws.
