= Rio Grande Southern Railroad, Motor No. 2 =

United States historic railcar

- Rio Grande Southern Motor No. 2
- U.S. National Register of Historic Places
- Colorado State Register of Historic Properties
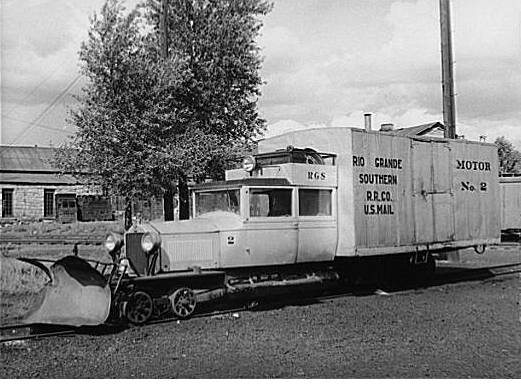
- Rio Grande Southern Railroad Galloping Goose 2, self-propelled rail car equipped with snow plow, Durango, Colorado

- Location within Colorado Location within the United States
- Nearest city: Golden, Colorado
- Coordinates: 39°46′17″N 105°11′36″W
- Area: less than one acre
- Built: 1939
- Built by: Odenbaugh, Jack; White, Forest
- Architectural style: narrow gauge RR motor car
- NRHP reference No.: 97000049
- CSRHP No.: 5JF.1013.1

Significant dates
- Added to NRHP: February 14, 1997
- Designated CSRHP: June 12, 1996

Rio Grande Southern Railroad (RGS), Motor 2 (nicknamed Galloping Goose Number 2) is a gasoline engine-powered narrow gauge railroad motorcar. It was converted on August 12, 1931, from a 1927 Buick Master Six 4-door sedan in a conversion known as a Galloping Goose. The Buick was cut behind the rear doorpost and extended with sheet metal 18 inches (46 cm) to form an enlarged passenger compartment. With no functional use, the steering column was removed. The couch from the RGS office become the back seat as it is shown being requisitioned for Goose No. 2 on the statement covering construction. The front axle was removed and replaced with a swiveling, two-axle lightweight railroad truck with 16 in-diameter (41 cm) wheels that carried and guided the front of the Goose. Ahead of the front truck the pilot (cow catcher) is attached to the frame. There were two small pivoted scrapers attached to the rear of the pilot to keep small objects on the track from derailing the lightweight front truck. During the winter season a small snowplow was attached to the front of the pilot.

The rear of the frame was lengthened using junked truck frame parts to carry the enclosed mail, express, and freight compartment. The compartment box is sixteen feet long, seven feet wide, and six foot ten inches high at the sides. It has a four-foot wide double door, approximately centered, on each side for access to the mail, express, and freight compartment. The roof is bowed upward in the center to shed moisture. The compartment was fabricated from 2 by 2 inches (5.1 by 5.1 cm) wood framing, with 1 by 2 inches (2.5 by 5.1 cm) wood strips running crossways. This is covered with 22 gauge galvanized sheet steel nailed to the 1 in × 2 in (25 mm × 51 mm) strips. The heating of the freight compartment of Goose No. 2 was noted as being considered in September 1931, soon after completion. Goose No. 2's stove is located in a four foot wide by two foot seven inch area added onto the rear of the compartment in the center. Examination shows that it was added on after the compartment box was built, but probably not too long thereafter, as the earliest photographs found show the addition.

The Goose was originally powered by the engine, clutch and transmission that came with the Buick sedan. These powered the rear swiveling two-axle truck assembly mounted under the rear frame and compartment. The drive shaft powers only the forward axle, which was made from a modified Ford truck rear axle. The rearmost axle is driven by roller chains and sprockets mounted outside of the wheels. The rear truck has twenty-four inch diameter cast wheels. The braking is accomplished by brake shoes between the axles on each truck being pushed against the wheel treads. These are actuated by linkage connecting them to the normal foot pedal and parking brake lever. The foot brake is connected to the front truck and the parking brake lever is connected to the rear truck. Goose No. 2 never received air brakes. The original paint scheme of Goose No. 2 is still an item of much discussion. Examination of the paint layers on the rear compartment exterior shows a shade of green on the bottom layer. It is now a light green, probably a faded Pullman dark green paint. Over that is black paint, and then the aluminum paint that was used after 1935. The body on Goose No. 2 was replaced around 1939 with the body from the San Christobal Railroad Goose No. 1 which was built by the RGS for the San Christobal in 1934. This is a Pierce-Arrow Model 80 body and is longer with larger side windows than that of the Buick body. The rear freight compartment was shortened eight inches to allow for the longer body and avoid altering the frame and drive shafts. This is its current configuration as displayed.

== Rio Grande Southern Railroad ==
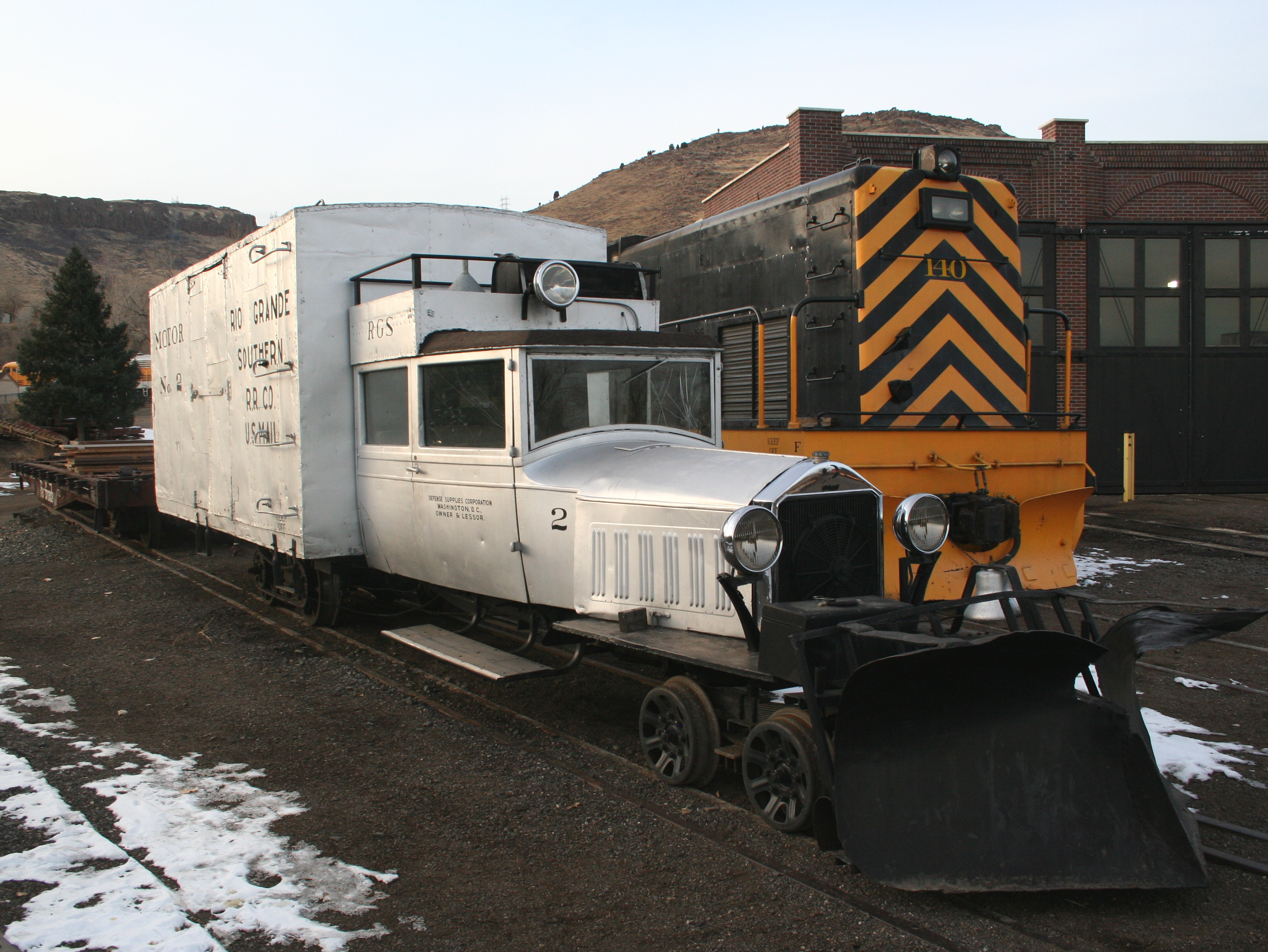
Rio Grande Southern Railroad Galloping Goose No.2 at Colorado Railroad Museum

Galloping Goose No. 2 is the only example of this type of narrow gauge rail car designed for combination passenger and freight service, which maintains this as-used configuration in Colorado and thus is significant at a statewide level. The period of significance is 1931-1943, the period during which Goose No. 2 operated regularly as part of the Rio Grande Southern Railroad.

Otto Mears incorporated the Rio Grande Southern Railroad in November 1889, as another of his many narrow gauge railroads in the San Juan Mountains of Colorado. Narrow gauge railroads operate on rails spaced 3 feet (0.91 m) apart as opposed to the 4 feet 8 1/2 inch spacing used by standard gauge railroads. Mears planned to tap the economic riches of the area—lumber, livestock, and mined ores, particularly silver. The area to be serviced stretched west and northwest of Durango to Ridgway, north of Ouray. The area was already well populated and promised a lucrative source of rail revenue. Construction of the RGS started in 1890 from the Denver and Rio Grande Railroad (D&RG) tracks in Durango towards Dolores and from the D&RG tracks in Ridgway toward Telluride and Ophir. The 162.6 mile railroad was finished in late 1891 with the joining of the two ends south of Rico. The year 1892 was a successful and profitable year for the RGS, but financial success was not long lasting.

== Bibliography ==
- American Railroad Association, Locomotive Cyclopedia of American Practice. Ninth Edition-1930 Simmons-Boardman Publishing Co., New York, N.Y., 1930. Republished 1985 by Newton K. Gregg, Novato California.
- Ferrell, Mallory Hope, Silver San Juan. The Rio Grande Southern Railroad, Pruett Publishing Co., Boulder, Colorado, 1973.
- Rhine, Stanley, Galloping Geese on the Rio Grande Southern. Tin Feathers and Gasoline Fumes. Colorado Railroad Museum, Golden, Colorado, 1971. Reprinted from the Colorado Rail Annual No. 9, Colorado Railroad Museum, Golden, 1971,
- Richardson, Robert W., Narrow Gauge News. Colorado Rail Annual No. 21. Colorado Railroad Museum, Golden, Colorado, 1994.
