= Rio Grande Southern Railroad, Motor No. 6 =

United States historic railcar

- U.S. National Register of Historic Places
- Colorado State Register of Historic Properties
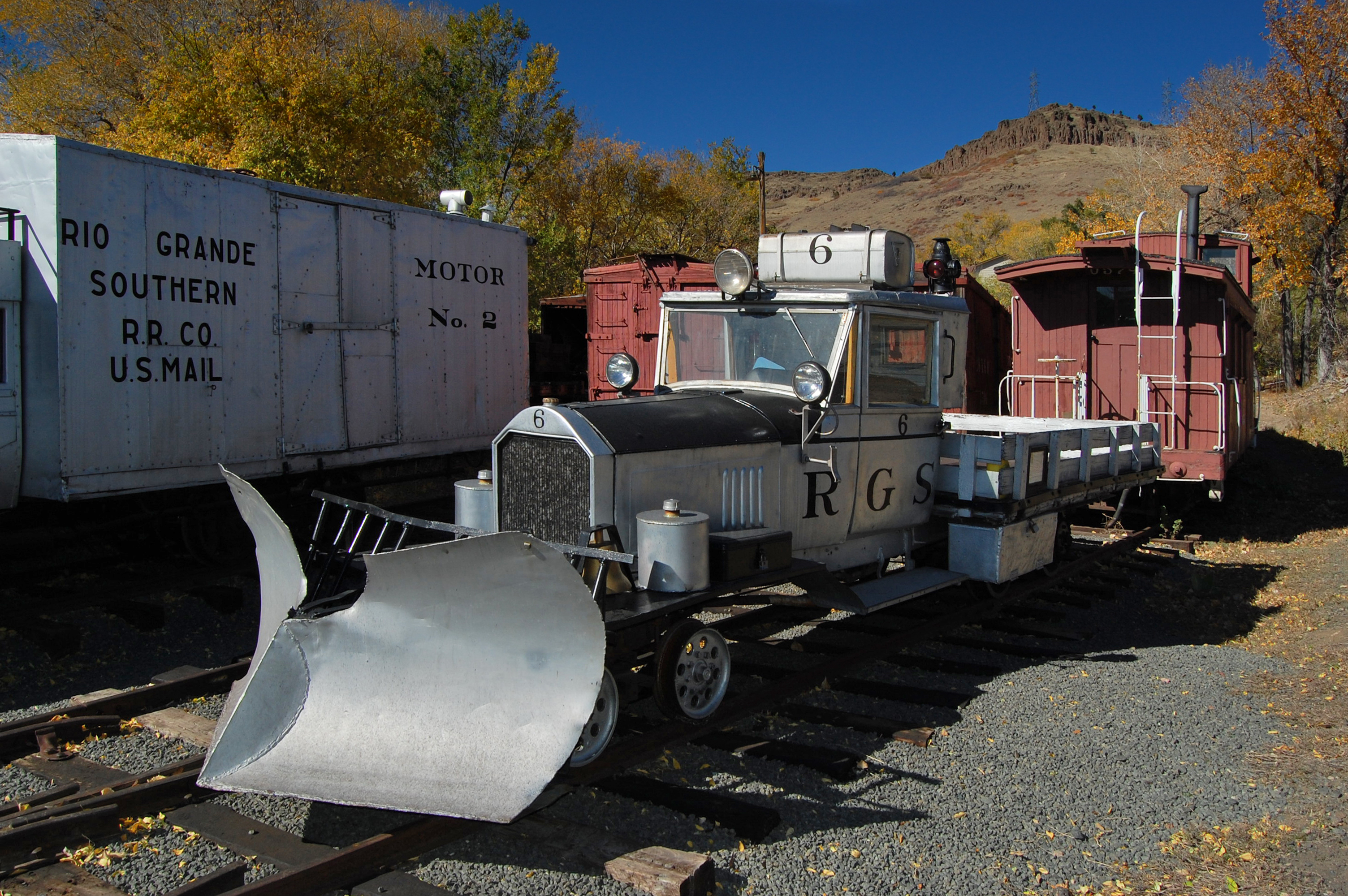
- Rio Grande Southern Railroad Galloping Goose 6, Colorado Railroad Museum, Golden, Colorado

- Location within Colorado Location within the United States
- Nearest city: Golden, Colorado
- Coordinates: 39°46′17″N 105°11′36″W
- Area: less than one acre
- Built: 1942
- Built by: Odenbaugh, Jack; White, Forest
- Architectural style: narrow gauge RR cars
- NRHP reference No.: 97000050
- CSRHP No.: 5JF.1013.2

Significant dates
- Added to NRHP: February 19, 1997
- Designated CSRHP: June 12, 1996

Rio Grande Southern Railroad (RGS), Motor Number 6 (affectionately nicknamed Galloping Goose Number 6) is a gasoline engine powered narrow gauge railroad motor car. The Galloping Goose body and chassis were built from a Buick automobile. The new Buick body was cut off behind the front seat and a new rear wall installed. The steering wheel was removed as it was not needed, but the other controls remained. The front axle was removed and replaced with a swiveling two axle lightweight railroad truck with sixteen inch diameter wheels that carried and guided the front of the Goose. Ahead of the front truck is the pilot (cow catcher) attached to the frame. Two small pivoted scrapers attached to the rear of the pilot slide on the rails to keep small objects on the track from derailing the lightweight front truck. During the winter season a small snow plow (now stored on the car's flatbed) was attached to the front of the pilot. The rear of the car frame was lengthened using steel channel riveted together but welded to the frame to carry the truck type flat-bed platform. The bed has short stake racks around the sides to keep materials from falling off. The Goose was originally powered by the 6-cylinder engine, clutch and transmission that came with the Buick. The drive chain powers the rear swiveling two axle truck assembly mounted under the rear frame and platform bed. The drive shaft turns only the forward axle. The rearmost axle is driven by roller chains and sprockets mounted outside of the wheels on each side. The rear truck has twenty four-inch diameter cast wheels. The braking is accomplished by brake shoes between the axles on each truck being pushed against the wheel treads. These are actuated by linkage connecting them to the normal foot pedal and parking brake lever. The foot brake is connected to the front truck and the parking brake lever is connected to the rear truck. Goose No. 6 received air brakes about 1939. The paint colors of Goose No. 6 early on is still an item of much discussion. Examination of the paint layers on the rear bed revealed only black and then aluminum that was used after 1935.

The Buick body on Goose No. 6 was replaced around 1942 with the body of a Pierce-Arrow automobile, probably a Pierce-Arrow Model 36. The Buick engine was also replaced with the Pierce-Arrow engine. Soon after a small box was attached behind and above the rear seat, probably to carry lunches and small tools. Around 1949 a second gas tank was placed on the cab roof. This was in addition to the other tank under the right front of the bed. Both tanks were hooked up to the engine. The automotive style marker lights were removed from the side of the cab and railroad style markers were placed on top of the cab at the outer edges. This is its current configuration as displayed at the Museum.
