= List of Michigan railroads =

The following railroads operate in the U.S. state of Michigan.

== Common freight carriers ==
- Adrian and Blissfield Rail Road (ADBF)
- Ann Arbor Railroad (AA)
- Canadian National Railway (CN) through subsidiaries Grand Trunk Western Railroad (GTW), Sault Ste. Marie Bridge Company (SSAM), and Wisconsin Central Ltd. (WC)
- Canadian Pacific Railway (CP) through subsidiary Soo Line Railroad (SOO)
- Charlotte Southern Railroad (CHS)
- Conrail Shared Assets Operations (CRSH, CSAO)
- Coopersville and Marne Railway (CPMY)
- CSX Transportation (CSXT)
- Delray Connecting Railroad (DC)
- Detroit Connecting Railroad (DCON)
- Escanaba and Lake Superior Railroad (ELS)
- Grand Elk Railroad (GDLK)
- Grand Rapids Eastern Railroad (GR)
- Great Lakes Central Railroad (GLC)
- Hamilton Northwestern Railroad (HNW)
- Huron and Eastern Railway (HESR)
- Indiana Northeastern Railroad (IN)
- Indiana and Ohio Railway (IORY)
- Jackson and Lansing Railroad (JAIL)
- Lake State Railway (LSRC)
- Lake Superior and Ishpeming Railroad (LSI)
- Lapeer Industrial Railroad (LIRR)
- Marquette Rail, LLC (MQT)
- Michigan Shore Railroad (MS)
- Michigan Southern Railroad (MSO)
- Mid-Michigan Railroad (MMRR)
- Mineral Range Railroad (MRA)
- Norfolk Southern Railway (NS)
- West Michigan Railroad (WMI)

== Private freight carriers ==
- carmeuse Lime & Stone
- Port Inland Railroad

== Passenger carriers ==
- Adrian & Blissfield Railroad (ADBF)
- Amtrak (AMTK)
- Charlotte Southern Railroad (CHS)
- Coopersville and Marne Railway
- Detroit People Mover
- ExpressTram
- Michigan State Trust for Railway Preservation
- QLine
- Southern Michigan Railroad

== Defunct railroads ==
Name	Mark	System (Note: This is one or more of the Class I railroads that the railroad became part of, if any.)	From	To	Successor
Allegan and Holland Railroad		PM	1868	1869	Michigan Lake Shore Railroad
Allegan and Lake Shore Railroad			1883	1889	N/A
Allegan and Southeastern Railroad		NYC	1878	1883	Toledo and Milwaukee Railway
Alpena and Northern Railroad		D&M	1893	1992	Detroit and Mackinac Railway
Amboy, Lansing and Traverse Bay Railroad		NYC	1857	1867	Jackson, Lansing and Saginaw Railroad, Northern Central Michigan Railroad
Ann Arbor Railroad	AA	AA	1895	1976	Consolidated Rail Corporation
Arcadia and Betsey River Railway			1895	1936	N/A
Au Sable and Northwestern Railroad		D&M	1891	1906	Au Sable and Northwestern Railway
Au Sable and Northwestern Railway		D&M	1908	1914	Detroit and Mackinac Railway
Battle Creek and Bay City Railway		NYC	1888	1889	Bay City and Battle Creek Railway
Battle Creek and Sturgis Railway		NYC	1889	1969	Penndel Company
Bay City and Alpena Railroad		D&M	1881	1883	Detroit, Bay City and Alpena Railroad
Bay City and Battle Creek Railway		NYC	1889	1916	Michigan Central Railroad
Bay City Belt Line Railroad		PM	1889	1903	Pere Marquette Railroad
Bay City and East Saginaw Railroad		PM	1864	1872	Flint and Pere Marquette Railway
Bay City Terminal Railway		CN	1910	1928	Grand Trunk Western Railroad
Bay De Noquet and Marquette Railroad		CP	1857	1871	Marquette and Ontonagon Railroad
Bay View, Little Traverse and Mackinaw Railroad		PRR	1879	1887	Grand Rapids and Indiana Railroad
Bear Lake and Eastern Railroad			1882	1902	N/A
Benton Harbor, Coloma and Paw Paw Lake Train Railway		PM	1895	1903	Pere Marquette Railroad
Benton Harbor and South Eastern Railway		PM	1893	1897	Milwaukee, Benton Harbor and Columbus Railway
Benton Harbor Terminal Railway			1901		N/A
Blaney and Southern Railway			1902		N/A
Blissfield Railroad			1935	1937	Ohio and Morenci Railroad
Boyne City Railroad	BCRR		1935	1976	N/A
Boyne City, Gaylord and Alpena Railroad	BCG&A		1905	1935	Boyne City Railroad
Boyne City and South Eastern Railroad			1893	1905	Boyne City, Gaylord and Alpena Railroad
Buchanan and St. Joseph River Railroad		NYC	1894	1912	Michigan Central Railroad
Buckley and Douglas Railroad			1881	1889	N/A
Cadillac and Lake City Railway	CLK		1963	1971	N/A
Canada and St. Louis Railway		NYC	1887	1889	Sturgis, Goshen and St. Louis Railway
Canada Southern Railway		NYC	1874	1882	Michigan Central Railroad
Canada Southern Bridge Company		NYC	1873		N/A
Caro and Lake Huron Railroad		NYC	1901	1908	Detroit and Bay City Railroad
Cass River Railroad		PM	1871	1872	Flint and Pere Marquette Railway
Central Railroad		NYC	1837	1846	Michigan Central Railroad
Central Michigan Railway	CMGN		1987	2003	Huron and Eastern Railway
Chesapeake and Ohio Railway	C&O, CO		1947	1987	CSX Transportation
Chicago and Canada Southern Railway		NYC	1871	1888	Detroit and Chicago Railroad
Chicago, Detroit and Canada Grand Trunk Junction Railroad		CN	1858	1928	Grand Trunk Western Railroad
Chicago and Grand Trunk Railway		CN	1880	1900	Port Huron and Indiana Railway
Chicago, Indiana and Southern Railroad		NYC	1906	1914	New York Central Railroad
Chicago, Kalamazoo and Saginaw Railway	CK&S	NYC	1883	1976	Consolidated Rail Corporation
Chicago and Kalamazoo Terminal Railroad		CN	1895	1928	Grand Trunk Western Railroad
Chicago and Lake Huron Railroad		CN	1873	1879	Michigan Railway, North Western Grand Trunk Railway
Chicago and Michigan Lake Shore Railroad		PM	1869	1878	Chicago and West Michigan Railroad
Chicago, Milwaukee and St. Paul Railway		MILW	1893	1928	Chicago, Milwaukee, St. Paul and Pacific Railroad
Chicago, Milwaukee, St. Paul and Pacific Railroad	MILW	MILW	1927	1984	Escanaba and Lake Superior Railroad
Chicago and North Michigan Railroad		PM	1891	1899	Chicago and West Michigan Railway
Chicago and North Eastern Railroad		CN	1874	1880	Chicago and Grand Trunk Railway
Chicago and North Western Railway	CNW	CNW	1859	1972	Chicago and North Western Transportation Company
Chicago and North Western Transportation Company	CNW	CNW	1972	1995	Union Pacific Railroad
Chicago, Saginaw and Canada Railroad		PM	1873	1883	Saginaw and Western Railroad
Chicago, St. Paul and Fond du Lac Railroad		CNW	1857	1859	Chicago and North Western Railway
Chicago and West Michigan Railroad		PM	1878	1881	Chicago and West Michigan Railway
Chicago and West Michigan Railway		PM	1881	1899	Pere Marquette Railroad
Cincinnati, Jackson and Mackinaw Railroad		NYC	1886	1892	Cincinnati and Michigan Railroad, Michigan and Mackinaw Railroad
Cincinnati, Jackson and Mackinaw Railway		NYC	1892	1897	Cincinnati Northern Railroad, Toledo and Milwaukee Railroad
Cincinnati and Michigan Railroad		NYC	1891	1892	Cincinnati, Jackson and Mackinaw Railway
Cincinnati Northern Railroad		NYC	1898	1938	Cleveland, Cincinnati, Chicago and St. Louis Railway
Cincinnati, Saginaw and Mackinaw Railroad		CN	1889	1943	Grand Trunk Western Railroad
Cincinnati, Wabash and Michigan Railway		NYC	1882	1915	Cleveland, Cincinnati, Chicago and St. Louis Railway
Cleveland, Cincinnati, Chicago and St. Louis Railway		NYC	1891	1976	Consolidated Rail Corporation
Coe Rail, Inc.	CRLE		1984	2006	Michigan Air-Line Railway
Coldwater Train Railway			1905		N/A
Colfax and Big Rapids Railroad			1887	1889	N/A
Connecting Railway		PRR	1956	1976	Consolidated Rail Corporation
Consolidated Rail Corporation	CR		1976	1999	CSX Transportation, Norfolk Southern Railway
Copper Range Railroad	CR, COPR		1899	1972	N/A
Crawford and Manistee River Railway			1885	1904	N/A
Dead River Railroad		CP	1889	1907	Duluth, South Shore and Atlantic Railway
Delray Terminal Railroad			1905		N/A
Detroit and Bay City Railroad		NYC	1881	1916	Michigan Central Railroad
Detroit and Bay City Railway		NYC	1871	1881	Detroit and Bay City Railroad
Detroit, Bay City and Alpena Railroad		D&M	1883	1894	Detroit and Mackinac Railway
Detroit, Bay City and Western Railroad			1907	1925	Detroit, Caro and Sandusky Railway
Detroit Belt Line Railroad		NYC	1909	1916	Michigan Central Railroad
Detroit, Butler and St. Louis Railroad		WAB	1880	1881	Wabash, St. Louis and Pacific Railway
Detroit, Caro and Sandusky Railway			1925	1953	N/A
Detroit and Charlevoix Railroad		NYC	1901	1916	Michigan Central Railroad
Detroit and Chicago Railroad		NYC	1888	1914	New York Central Railroad
Detroit and Cincinnati Railway		DT&I	1896	1897	Detroit and Lima Northern Railway
Detroit, Delray and Dearborn Railroad		NYC	1895	1916	Michigan Central Railroad
Detroit, Grand Haven and Milwaukee Railway		CN	1878	1928	Grand Trunk Western Railroad
Detroit, Grand Rapids and Western Railroad		PM	1896	1899	Pere Marquette Railroad
Detroit, Hillsdale and Indiana Railroad		NYC	1869	1875	Detroit, Hillsdale and South Western Railroad
Detroit, Hillsdale and South Western Railroad		NYC	1875	1960	Michigan Central Railroad
Detroit and Howell Railroad		PM	1864	1870	Detroit, Howell and Lansing Railroad
Detroit, Howell and Lansing Railroad		PM	1870	1871	Detroit, Lansing and Lake Michigan Railroad
Detroit and Huron Railway		CN	1912	1928	Grand Trunk Western Railroad
Detroit and Ironton Railroad		DT&I	1920	1931	Detroit, Toledo and Ironton Railroad
Detroit, Lansing and Lake Michigan Railroad		PM	1871	1876	Detroit, Lansing and Northern Railroad
Detroit, Lansing and Northern Railroad		PM	1876	1896	Detroit, Grand Rapids and Western Railroad
Detroit and Lima Northern Railway		DT&I	1897	1901	Detroit Southern Railroad
Detroit and Mackinac Railway	D&M, DM	D&M	1894	1992	Lake State Railway
Detroit, Mackinac and Marquette Railroad		CP	1879	1886	Mackinaw and Marquette Railroad
Detroit Manufacturers Railroad		NYC	1902	1969	Penndel Company
Detroit and Milwaukee Railroad		CN	1860	1878	Detroit, Grand Haven and Milwaukee Railway
Detroit and Milwaukee Railway		CN	1855	1860	Detroit and Milwaukee Railroad
Detroit, Monroe and Toledo Railroad		NYC	1855	1914	New York Central Railroad
Detroit and Pontiac Railroad		CN	1834	1855	Detroit and Milwaukee Railroad
Detroit River Railroad and Bridge Company		NYC	1872	1873	Canada Southern Bridge Company
Detroit River Bridge Company		NYC	1898	1905	Michigan and Canada Bridge and Tunnel Company
Detroit River Tunnel Company		NYC	1905		
Detroit and St. Joseph Railroad		NYC	1832	1837	Central Railroad
Detroit Southern Railroad		DT&I	1901	1905	Detroit, Toledo and Ironton Railway
Detroit and State Line Railroad		NYC	1872	1872	Toledo, Canada Southern and Detroit Railway
Detroit and State Line Wabash Railroad		WAB	1889	1889	Wabash Railroad
Detroit Terminal Railroad	DT	CN/ NYC	1905	1984	Consolidated Rail Corporation
Detroit Terminal Railway		NYC	1901	1902	Detroit Manufacturers Railroad
Detroit, Toledo and Ironton Railroad	DT&I, DTI	DT&I	1914	1983	Grand Trunk Western Railroad
Detroit, Toledo and Ironton Railway		DT&I	1905	1913	Detroit, Toledo and Ironton Railroad
Detroit, Toledo and Milwaukee Railroad		NYC	1897	1969	Penndel Company
Detroit and Toledo Shore Line Railroad	D&TS, DTS	CN/ NKP	1899	1981	Grand Trunk Western Railroad
Detroit Transit Railway		NYC	1872	1901	Detroit Terminal Railway
Detroit Union Railroad Depot and Station Company		PM/ WAB	1881	1955	Penndel Company
Detroit and Western Railway		WAB	1908	1958	Wabash Railroad
Duluth, South Shore and Atlantic Railroad	DSA	CP	1949	1961	Soo Line Railroad
Duluth, South Shore and Atlantic Railway	DS&A, DSS&A, DSA	CP	1887	1949	Duluth, South Shore and Atlantic Railroad
East Jordan and Southern Railroad	EJ&S		1901	1961	N/A
East Saginaw and St. Clair Railroad		PM	1872	1889	Flint and Pere Marquette Railroad
Elkhart, Niles and Lake Michigan Railroad		NYC	1880	1882	Cincinnati, Wabash and Michigan Railway
Empire and Southeastern Railroad				1920	N/A
Epworth League Railway			1895	1901	Ludington and Northern Railway
Erie and Kalamazoo Railroad		NYC	1833	1976	Consolidated Rail Corporation
Erie and Michigan Railway and Navigation Company	E&M, EM	D&M	1904	1949	Detroit and Mackinac Railway
Escanaba, Frankfort and Southeastern Railroad		AA	1895	1895	Ann Arbor Railroad
Escanaba, Iron Mountain and Western Railroad		CNW	1890	1947	Chicago and North Western Railway
Escanaba and Lake Superior Railway			1898	1901	Escanaba and Lake Superior Railroad
Escanaba and Lake Superior Railway		CNW	1880	1882	Chicago and North Western Railway
Flint Belt Railroad		PM	1921	1955	Chesapeake and Ohio Railway
Flint and Fentonville Railroad		PM	1863	1863	Flint and Holly Railroad
Flint and Holly Railroad		PM	1863	1868	Flint and Pere Marquette Railway
Flint and Pere Marquette Railroad		PM	1880	1899	Pere Marquette Railroad
Flint and Pere Marquette Railway		PM	1857	1880	Flint and Pere Marquette Railroad
Flint River Railroad		PM	1871	1872	Flint and Pere Marquette Railway
Fort Street Union Depot Company	FSUD	PM	1889	1969	Chesapeake and Ohio Railway
Fort Wayne and Jackson Railroad		NYC	1880	1976	Consolidated Rail Corporation
Fort Wayne, Jackson and Saginaw Railroad		NYC	1869	1879	Fort Wayne and Jackson Railroad
Frankfort and Southeastern Railroad		AA	1885	1892	Toledo, Ann Arbor and North Michigan Railway
Garden Bay Railway			1914	1917	N/A
Glencoe, Pinconning and Lake Shore Railroad		NYC	1876	1879	Pinconning Railroad
Gogebic and Montreal River Railroad		CP	1883		
Grand Haven Railroad		PM	1878	1881	Chicago and West Michigan Railway
Grand Rapids, Belding and Saginaw Railroad		PM	1898	1903	Pere Marquette Railroad
Grand Rapids and Holland Railroad		PM	1871	1871	Chicago and Michigan Lake Shore Railroad
Grand Rapids and Indiana Railroad		PRR	1855	1896	Grand Rapids and Indiana Railway
Grand Rapids and Indiana Railway		PRR	1896	1954	Penndel Company
Grand Rapids, Indiana and Mackinaw Railroad		PRR	1881	1884	Grand Rapids and Indiana Railroad
Grand Rapids, Kalkaska and Southeastern Railroad		PM	1897	1920	N/A
Grand Rapids and Lake Shore Railroad		PM	1869	1870	Chicago and Michigan Lake Shore Railroad
Grand Rapids, Lansing and Detroit Railroad		PM	1887	1896	Detroit, Grand Rapids and Western Railroad
Grand Rapids and Mackinaw Railroad		PRR	1857	1857	Grand Rapids and Indiana Railroad
Grand Rapids, Newaygo and Lake Shore Railroad		PM	1869	1881	Chicago and West Michigan Railway
Grand Rapids and Southern Railroad		PRR	1855	1855	Grand Rapids and Indiana Railroad
Grand Rapids Terminal Railroad		CN	1904	1928	Grand Trunk Western Railroad
Grand Rapids Terminal Belt Railway		PM	1905		Pere Marquette Railway
Grand River Valley Railroad		NYC	1846	1916	Michigan Central Railroad
Grand Trunk Railway	GT	CN	1859	1923	Canadian National Railway
Grand Trunk Railway of Michigan		NYC	1867	1868	Michigan Air Line Railroad
Grand Trunk Western Railway		CN	1900	1928	Grand Trunk Western Railroad
Grass Lake and Manistee River Railroad			1886	1892	N/A
Grayling, Twin Lakes and Northeastern Railroad		NYC	1891	1901	Jackson, Lansing and Saginaw Railroad
Hancock and Calumet Railroad		CP	1885	1935	Mineral Range Railroad
Harbor Beach and Port Hope Railroad		PM	1903	1903	Pere Marquette Railroad
Harbor Springs Railway			1901	1912	N/A
Hastings, Lowell and Northern Michigan Railroad		PM	1883	1887	Lowell and Hastings Railroad
Hecla Belt Line Railroad			1902	1913	Bay City and Battle Creek Railway
Hillsdale County Railway	HCRC		1976	1992	Indiana Northeastern Railroad
Hobart and Manistee River Railroad			1879	1890	N/A
Holly, Wayne and Monroe Railway		PM	1865	1872	Flint and Pere Marquette Railway
Houghton and L'Anse Railroad		CP	1881	1883	Marquette, Houghton and Ontonagon Railroad
Houghton and Ontonagon Railroad		CP	1870	1872	Marquette, Houghton and Ontonagon Railroad
Howell and Lansing Railroad		PM	1868	1870	Detroit, Howell and Lansing Railroad
Huron and Western Railroad		PM	1902	1940	N/A
Indiana, Illinois and Iowa Railroad		NYC	1900	1906	Chicago, Indiana and Southern Railroad
Indiana and Lake Michigan Railway		NYC	1887	1898	St. Joseph, South Bend and Southern Railroad
Indiana and Michigan Railroad		PM	1881	1881	Chicago and West Michigan Railway
Ingalls, White Rapids and Northern Railroad			1889	1894	Wisconsin and Michigan Railway
Ingalls, White Rapids and Northern Railway			1886	1889	Ingalls, White Rapids and Northern Railroad
Ionia and Lansing Railroad		PM	1866	1871	Detroit, Lansing and Lake Michigan Railroad
Ionia, Stanton and Northern Railroad		PM	1872	1872	Detroit, Lansing and Lake Michigan Railroad
Iron Mountain Railroad		CP	1855	1859	Bay De Noquet and Marquette Railroad
Iron Mountain Railway		CP	1855	1857	Iron Mountain Railroad
Iron Range and Huron Bay Railroad			1890	1900	N/A
Iron Range Railway		CNW	1887	1889	Chicago and North Western Railway
Iron River Railway		CNW	1886	1889	Chicago and North Western Railway
Ithaca and Alma Railroad		AA	1882	1882	Saginaw Valley and St. Louis Railroad
Jackson and Cincinnati Railway		NYC	1895	1898	Cincinnati Northern Railroad
Jackson, Fort Wayne and Cincinnati Railroad		NYC	1868	1869	Fort Wayne, Jackson and Saginaw Railroad
Jackson, Lansing and Saginaw Railroad		NYC	1865	1916	Michigan Central Railroad
Jackson and Ohio Railroad		NYC	1884	1886	Cincinnati, Jackson and Mackinaw Railroad
Jennings and Northeastern Railroad				1920	
Kalamazoo and Allegan Railroad		NYC	1867	1868	Kalamazoo, Allegan and Grand Rapids Railroad
Kalamazoo, Allegan and Grand Rapids Railroad		NYC	1868	1976	Consolidated Rail Corporation
Kalamazoo and Grand Rapids Railroad		NYC	1868	1868	Kalamazoo, Allegan and Grand Rapids Railroad
Kalamazoo, Lake Shore and Chicago Railroad	KLSC		1987	1995	West Michigan Railroad
Kalamazoo, Lake Shore and Chicago Railway	KLS		1905	1925	N/A
Kalamazoo, Lowell and Northern Michigan Railroad		PM	1871	1883	Hastings, Lowell and Northern Michigan Railroad
Kalamazoo and Schoolcraft Railroad		NYC	1866	1869	Kalamazoo and White Pigeon Railroad
Kalamazoo and South Haven Railroad		NYC	1869	1916	Michigan Central Railroad
Kalamazoo and White Pigeon Railroad		NYC	1869	1914	New York Central Railroad
Keweenaw Central Railroad	KCRR		1905		
Lac La Belle and Calumet Railroad			1883	1888	Keweenaw Central Railroad
Lake George and Muskegon River Railroad		AA	1876	1886	Toledo, Ann Arbor and Cadillac Railway
Lake Huron and Southwestern Railway		D&M	1879	1879	Tawas and Bay County Railroad
Lake Michigan Division of the Toledo and South Haven Railroad		PM	1884	1886	Toledo and South Haven Railroad
Lake Shore Railroad of Western Michigan		PM	1869	1869	Chicago and Michigan Lake Shore Railroad
Lake Shore and Michigan Southern Railway		NYC	1869	1914	New York Central Railroad
Lake Superior Iron Mountain Railroad		CP	1862	1878	Marquette, Houghton and Ontonagon Railroad
Lake Superior and Ishpeming Railway		LSI	1893	1923	Lake Superior and Ishpeming Railroad
Lansing, Alma, Mount Pleasant and Northern Railroad		AA	1884	1886	Toledo, Ann Arbor and Mount Pleasant Railway
Lansing Connecting Railroad			1914		
Lansing and Jackson Railroad		NYC	1864	1865	Jackson, Lansing and Saginaw Railroad
Lansing Manufacturers Railroad		NYC	1904	1969	Penndel Company
Lansing Transit Railway		NYC	1886	1969	Penndel Company
Lapeer and Northern Railroad			1872	1880	N/A
Leelanau Transit Company	LTCR	PM	1919	1973	N/A
Lenawee County Railroad	LCRC		1977	1990	Adrian and Blissfield Rail Road
Lewiston and Southeastern Railroad			1896	1910	N/A
Lima Northern Railway		DT&I	1895	1897	Detroit and Lima Northern Railway
Lowell and Hastings Railroad		PM	1887	1899	Grand Rapids, Belding and Saginaw Railroad
Ludington and Northern Railway	LUN		1901	1982	N/A
Mackinaw and Marquette Railroad		CP	1886	1887	Duluth, South Shore and Atlantic Railway
Manistee Railroad		PM	1880	1889	Flint and Pere Marquette Railroad
Manistee and Grand Rapids Railroad			1889	1913	Michigan East and West Railway
Manistee and Luther Railroad			1886	1914	N/A
Manistee and North-Eastern Railroad	M&NE		1887	1926	Manistee and Northeastern Railway
Manistee and Northeastern Railway	M&NE	PM	1926	1955	Chesapeake and Ohio Railway
Manistique and Lake Superior Railroad	M&LS, MLS	AA	1909	1968	N/A
Manistique and Northern Railroad		AA	1908	1909	Manistique and Lake Superior Railroad
Manistique and Northwestern Railway		AA	1891	1902	Manistique, Marquette and Northern Railroad
Manistique, Marquette and Northern Railroad		AA	1902	1908	Manistique and Northern Railroad
Manistique Railway			1886	1910	N/A
Mansfield, Coldwater and Lake Michigan Railroad		NYC	1871	1877	Allegan and Southeastern Railroad
Marquette, Houghton and Ontonagon Railroad		CP	1872	1890	Duluth, South Shore and Atlantic Railway
Marquette and Huron Mountain Railroad	MHCO		1963	1985	N/A
Marquette and Ontonagon Railroad		CP	1863	1872	Marquette, Houghton and Ontonagon Railroad
Marquette and Ontonagon Railway		CP	1857	1863	Marquette and Ontonagon Railroad
Marquette and Southeastern Railway		LSI	1900	1911	Munising, Marquette and Southeastern Railway
Marquette and State Line Railroad		CNW	1857	1857	Chicago, St. Paul and Fond du Lac Railroad
Marquette and Western Railroad		CP	1883	1885	Marquette, Houghton and Ontonagon Railroad
Mason and Oceana Railroad			1886	1909	N/A
Mecosta Railroad			1882	1888	N/A
Menominee Branch Railroad		MILW	1883	1887	Milwaukee and Northern Railroad
Menominee and Northern Railroad			1893	1895	Wisconsin and Michigan Railway
Menominee River Railroad		CNW	1875	1882	Chicago and North Western Railway
Menominee and St. Paul Railway		AA	1899	1958	N/A
Menominee and Sault Ste. Marie Railway		CP	1885	1888	Minneapolis, Sault Ste. Marie and Atlantic Railway
Michigan Railway		CN	1880	1880	Chicago and Grand Trunk Railway
Michigan Air Line Railroad		NYC	1868	1916	Michigan Central Railroad
Michigan Air Line Railway		CN	1875	1928	Grand Trunk Western Railroad
Michigan Air-Line Railway	MAL		2006	2011	
Michigan and Canada Bridge and Tunnel Company		NYC	1905	1905	Detroit River Tunnel Company
Michigan Central Railroad		NYC	1846	1976	Consolidated Rail Corporation
Michigan Central Bridge Company		NYC	1896	1898	Detroit River Bridge Company
Michigan East and West Railway			1914	1918	N/A
Michigan Interstate Railway			1977	1988	Ann Arbor Railroad
Michigan Lake Shore Railroad		PM	1869	1878	Grand Haven Railroad
Michigan and Mackinaw Railroad		NYC	1891	1892	Cincinnati, Jackson and Mackinaw Railway
Michigan Midland Railroad		NYC	1870	1873	Michigan Midland and Canada Railroad
Michigan Midland and Canada Railroad		NYC	1872	1906	St. Clair and Western Railroad
Michigan Northern Railway	MIGN		1976	1986	Tuscola and Saginaw Bay Railway
Michigan and Ohio Railroad		NYC	1883	1887	Cincinnati, Jackson and Mackinaw Railroad
Michigan, Ohio and Indiana Railroad		DT&I	1905	1906	Toledo, Ann Arbor and Detroit Railroad
Michigan Southern Railroad		NYC	1846	1855	Michigan Southern and Northern Indiana Railroad
Michigan Southern and Northern Indiana Railroad		NYC	1855	1869	Lake Shore and Michigan Southern Railway
Milwaukee, Benton Harbor and Columbus Railway		PM	1897	1903	Pere Marquette Railroad
Milwaukee, Lake Shore and Western Railroad		CNW	1872	1875	Milwaukee, Lake Shore and Western Railway
Milwaukee, Lake Shore and Western Railway		CNW	1875	1893	Chicago and North Western Railway
Milwaukee and Northern Railroad		MILW	1887	1893	Chicago, Milwaukee and St. Paul Railway
Mineral Range Railroad	MLR	CP	1872	1949	Duluth, South Shore and Atlantic Railroad
Mineral Range and L'Anse Bay Railroad		CP	1871	1872	Mineral Range Railroad
Minneapolis, St. Paul and Sault Ste. Marie Railroad	SOO	CP	1944	1961	Soo Line Railroad
Minneapolis, St. Paul and Sault Ste. Marie Railway	SOO	CP	1888	1944	Minneapolis, St. Paul and Sault Ste. Marie Railroad
Minneapolis, Sault Ste. Marie and Atlantic Railway		CP	1888	1888	Minneapolis, St. Paul and Sault Ste. Marie Railroad
Miscauno and North-Western Railway			1905	1905	Wisconsin and Michigan Railway
Monroe and Toledo Railway		PM	1893	1897	Flint and Pere Marquette Railroad
Montague, Pentwater and Manistee Railroad		PM	1871	1871	Chicago and Michigan Lake Shore Railroad
Munising Railway		LSI	1895	1911	Munising, Marquette and Southeastern Railway
Munising, Marquette and Southeastern Railway		LSI	1911	1923	Lake Superior and Ishpeming Railroad
Muskegon Railway and Navigation Company		CN	1918	1955	Grand Trunk Western Railroad
Muskegon and Big Rapids Railroad		PM	1871	1872	Chicago and Michigan Lake Shore Railroad
Muskegon and Ferrysburg Railroad		PM	1869	1869	Michigan Lake Shore Railroad
Muskegon, Grand Rapids and Indiana Railroad		PRR	1886	1917	Grand Rapids and Indiana Railroad
Muskegon Lake Railroad		PM	1879	1900	Pere Marquette Railroad
Muskegon River and Rose Lake Railway			1878	1881	N/A
Negaunee and Palmer Railroad		CP	1888	1890	Duluth, South Shore and Atlantic Railway
New York Central Railroad	NYC	NYC	1914	1968	Penn Central Transportation Company
Norfolk and Western Railway	N&W, NW		1964	1998	Norfolk Southern Railway
Northern Central Michigan Railroad		NYC	1866	1914	New York Central Railroad
Northern Michigan Railroad			1888	1899	Copper Range Railroad
North Western Grand Trunk Railway		CN	1879	1880	Chicago and Grand Trunk Railway
Oakland and Ottawa Railroad		CN	1848	1855	Detroit and Milwaukee Railroad
Ohio and Michigan Railway		NYC	1870	1871	Mansfield, Coldwater and Lake Michigan Railroad
Ohio and Michigan Traction Company		DT&I	1903	1904	Toledo, Ann Arbor and Detroit Railroad
Ohio and Morenci Railroad			1933	1954	N/A
Onaway and North Michigan Railway			1901		N/A
Ontonagon Railroad		MILW	1904	1932	Chicago, Milwaukee, St. Paul and Pacific Railroad
Ontonagon and Brule River Railroad		MILW	1880	1890	Milwaukee and Northern Railroad
Ontonagon and State Line Railroad		CNW	1856	1857	Chicago, St. Paul and Fond du Lac Railroad
Owosso and Big Rapids Railroad		AA	1869	1871	Owosso and North Western Railroad
Owosso and North Western Railroad		AA	1871	1883	Toledo, Ann Arbor and North Michigan Railway
Oxford and Port Austin Railroad		CN	1879	1880	Pontiac, Oxford and Port Austin Railroad
Paint River Railway		CNW	1890	1891	Chicago and North Western Railway
Palmyra and Jacksonburgh Railroad		NYC	1836	1844	Southern Railroad
Paris and Pere Marquette River Railroad			1882	1889	N/A
Patterson Railroad		PM	1870	1872	Detroit, Lansing and Lake Michigan Railroad
Paw Paw Railroad		PM	1857	1886	Toledo and South Haven Railroad
Peninsula Railroad of Michigan		CNW	1862	1865	Chicago and North Western Railway
Peninsular Railway		CN	1865	1868	Peninsular Railway
Peninsular Railway		CN	1868	1870	Peninsular Railway
Peninsular Railway		CN	1870	1873	Chicago and Lake Huron Railroad
Peninsular Railway Extension Company		CN	1868	1868	Peninsular Railway
Penn Central Transportation Company	PC		1968	1976	Consolidated Rail Corporation
Penndel Company		PRR	1954	1976	Consolidated Rail Corporation
Pensalt Railroad			1901	1908	Wyandotte Southern Railroad
Pennsylvania Railroad	PRR	PRR	1921	1968	Penn Central Transportation Company
Pennsylvania–Detroit Railroad		PRR	1917	1926	Pennsylvania, Ohio and Detroit Railroad
Pennsylvania, Ohio and Detroit Railroad		PRR	1926	1956	Connecting Railway
Penokee Railroad		CP	1886	1888	Wisconsin Central Company
Pere Marquette Railroad		PM	1899	1917	Pere Marquette Railway
Pere Marquette Railway	PM	PM	1917	1947	Chesapeake and Ohio Railway
Pere Marquette Railroad of Indiana		PM	1903	1907	Pere Marquette Railroad
Pinconning Railroad		NYC	1879	1880	Saginaw Bay and Northwestern Railroad
Pleasant Bay Railway		CN/ NKP	1898	1899	Detroit and Toledo Shore Line Railroad
Pontiac, Oxford and Northern Railroad		CN	1889	1928	Grand Trunk Western Railroad
Pontiac, Oxford and Port Austin Railroad		CN	1880	1889	Pontiac, Oxford and Northern Railroad
Port Huron Railroad Tunnel Company		CN	1886	1886	St. Clair Tunnel Company
Port Huron and Detroit Railroad	PH&D, PHD		1917	1990	CSX Transportation
Port Huron and Indiana Railway		CN	1900	1900	Grand Trunk Western Railway
Port Huron and Lake Michigan Railroad		CN	1847	1873	Chicago and Lake Huron Railroad
Port Huron and Milwaukee Railway		CN	1855	1863	Port Huron and Lake Michigan Railroad
Port Huron and Northwestern Railway		PM	1878	1889	Flint and Pere Marquette Railroad
Port Huron Southern Railroad			1900	1917	Port Huron and Detroit Railroad
Port Huron and South Western Railway		PM	1882	1882	Port Huron and Northwestern Railway
Potts Logging Railway		D&M	1887	1891	Au Sable and Northwestern Railroad
Quincy & Torch Lake Railroad			1890	1945	N/A
Quinnesec and Western Railway			1905	1905	Wisconsin and Michigan Railway
Republic Branch Railroad		MILW	1881	1887	Milwaukee and Northern Railroad
River Raisin and Lake Erie Railroad		NYC	1836	1840	Southern Railroad
Saginaw Bay and Northwestern Railroad		NYC	1880	1901	Jackson, Lansing and Saginaw Railroad
Saginaw Bay Southern Railway	SBS		2005	2012	Lake State Railway
Saginaw and Clare County Railroad		PM	1877	1889	Flint and Pere Marquette Railroad
Saginaw and Grand Rapids Railroad		PM	1878	1896	Detroit, Grand Rapids and Western Railroad
Saginaw and Mount Pleasant Railroad		PM	1879	1889	Flint and Pere Marquette Railroad
Saginaw, Tuscola and Huron Railroad		PM	1881	1903	Pere Marquette Railroad
Saginaw Valley and St. Louis Railroad		PM	1871	1896	Detroit, Grand Rapids and Western Railroad
Saginaw and Western Railroad		PM	1883	1896	Detroit, Grand Rapids and Western Railroad
St. Clair and Chicago Air Line Railroad		CN	1872	1875	Michigan Air Line Railway
St. Clair River, Pontiac and Jackson Railroad		CN	1872	1872	St. Clair and Chicago Air Line Railroad
St. Clair Tunnel Company		CN	1886	2008	Grand Trunk Western Railroad
St. Clair and Western Railroad		NYC	1906	1932	N/A
St. Joseph, South Bend and Southern Railroad		NYC	1899	1943	New York Central Railroad
St. Joseph Valley Railroad		NYC	1848	1869	Schoolcraft and Three Rivers Railroad
St. Joseph Valley Railroad		PM	1880	1889	St. Joseph Valley Railway
St. Joseph Valley Railway		PM	1889	1897	Milwaukee, Benton Harbor and Columbus Railway
St. Lawrence and Hudson Railway	STLH	CP	1996	2001	Canadian Pacific Railway
St. Louis, Sturgis and Battle Creek Railroad		NYC	1884	1889	Battle Creek and Sturgis Railway
Ste. Marie Union Depot Company		CP	1900	1952	Duluth, South Shore and Atlantic Railroad, Minneapolis, St. Paul and Sault Ste. Marie Railroad
Sanilac Railroad		PM	1901	1903	Pere Marquette Railroad
Sault Ste. Marie and Marquette Railroad		CP	1880	1887	Duluth, South Shore and Atlantic Railway
Schoolcraft and Three Rivers Railroad		NYC	1855	1869	Kalamazoo and White Pigeon Railroad
Shelby and Detroit Railroad			1834	1844	N/A
South Bend and St. Joseph Railroad		PM	1884	1884	St. Joseph Valley Railroad
South Haven and Eastern Railroad		PM	1894	1903	Pere Marquette Railroad
South Eastern Michigan Railway		NYC	1871	1871	Chicago and Canada Southern Railway
Southern Railroad		NYC	1837	1846	Michigan Southern Railroad
Sturgis, Goshen and St. Louis Railway		NYC	1890	1915	New York Central Railroad
Sturgis and State Line Railway		NYC	1886	1887	Canada and St. Louis Railway
Tawas and Bay County Railroad		D&M	1880	1883	Detroit, Bay City and Alpena Railroad
Tecumseh Branch Connecting Railroad (TCBY)	TCBY	ADBF	2001	2009	Adrian and Blissfield Rail Road
Toledo and Ann Arbor Railroad		AA	1877	1880	Toledo, Ann Arbor and Grand Trunk Railway
Toledo, Ann Arbor and Cadillac Railway		AA	1886	1888	Toledo, Ann Arbor and North Michigan Railway
Toledo, Ann Arbor and Detroit Railroad		DT&I	1904	1912	Toledo, Ann Arbor and Jackson Railroad
Toledo, Ann Arbor and Grand Trunk Railway		AA	1880	1884	Toledo, Ann Arbor and North Michigan Railway
Toledo, Ann Arbor and Jackson Railroad		DT&I	1911	1915	Toledo–Detroit Railroad
Toledo, Ann Arbor and Lake Michigan Railway		AA	1888	1890	Toledo, Ann Arbor and North Michigan Railway
Toledo, Ann Arbor and Mount Pleasant Railway		AA	1886	1887	Toledo, Ann Arbor and North Michigan Railway
Toledo, Ann Arbor and North Michigan Railway		AA	1882	1895	Ann Arbor Railroad, Escanaba, Frankfort and Southeastern Railroad
Toledo, Ann Arbor and Northeastern Railroad		AA	1878	1880	Toledo, Ann Arbor and Grand Trunk Railway
Toledo, Ann Arbor and Northern Railroad		AA	1869	1875	Toledo and Ann Arbor Railroad
Toledo, Canada Southern and Detroit Railway		NYC	1872	1916	Michigan Central Railroad
Toledo–Detroit Railroad		DT&I	1915	1931	Detroit, Toledo and Ironton Railroad
Toledo and Milwaukee Railroad		NYC	1897	1897	Detroit, Toledo and Milwaukee Railroad
Toledo and Milwaukee Railway		NYC	1879	1883	Michigan and Ohio Railroad
Toledo, Saginaw and Mackinaw Railroad		CN	1887	1890	Cincinnati, Saginaw and Mackinaw Railroad
Toledo, Saginaw and Muskegon Railway		CN	1886	1928	Grand Trunk Western Railroad
Toledo and South Haven Railroad		PM	1876	1894	South Haven and Eastern Railroad
Traverse City Railroad		PRR	1871	1917	Grand Rapids and Indiana Railroad
Traverse City, Leelanau, and Manistique Railroad		PM	1901	1907	Traverse City, Leelanau and Manistique Railway
Traverse City, Leelanau and Manistique Railway		PM	1908	1919	Leelanau Transit Company
Tuscola and Saginaw Bay Railway	TSBY		1977	2006	Great Lakes Central Railroad
Union Pacific Railroad	UP		1995	1997	Sault Ste. Marie Bridge Company
Vieux Desert and Lake Superior Railroad		CNW	1881	1883	Milwaukee, Lake Shore and Western Railway
Wabash Railroad	WAB	WAB	1937	1991	Norfolk and Western Railway
Wabash Railroad		WAB	1889	1915	Wabash Railway
Wabash Railway		WAB	1915	1941	Wabash Railroad
Wabash, St. Louis and Pacific Railway		WAB	1881	1886	Detroit and State Line Wabash Railroad
Wabash Western Railway		WAB	1889	1889	Wabash Railroad
West Jersey Railroad	WJ		1995	1995	West Michigan Railroad
White River Railroad		PM	1879	1884	Chicago and West Michigan Railway
Wisconsin Central Company		CP	1888	1899	Wisconsin Central Railway
Wisconsin Central Railroad		CP	1954	1961	Soo Line Railroad
Wisconsin Central Railway		CP	1897	1954	Wisconsin Central Railroad
Wisconsin and Michigan Railway	WAND		1992	1995	N/A
Wisconsin and Michigan Railway			1893	1938	N/A
Wisconsin, Michigan and Northern Railway			1898	1902	Wisconsin and Michigan Railway
Wisconsin, Sault Ste. Marie and Mackinac Railway		CP	1886	1887	Duluth, South Shore and Atlantic Railway
Wyandotte Southern Railroad	WYS		1908	1986	N/A
Wyandotte Terminal Railroad	WYT		1904	1982	N/A

Passenger carriers

- Alanson and Petoskey Railroad
- Baltimore and Ohio Railroad (B&O, BO): trackage rights to Detroit for passenger trains only
- Boyne Valley Railroad
- Western State Normal Railroad

Electric

- Adrian Electric Street Railway
- Adrian Street Railway
- Ann Arbor and Ypsilanti Electric Railway
- Ann Arbor and Ypsilanti Street Railway
- Bay Cities Consolidated Railway
- Benton Harbor and St. Joseph Electric Railway
- Citizens' Street Railway (Battle Creek)
- Citizens' Street Railway (Kalamazoo)
- City Electric Railway (Detroit)
- City Electric Railway (Port Huron)
- Consolidated Street Railway
- Crystal Lake Railway
- Detroit Railway
- Detroit and Chicago Traction Company
- Detroit Citizens' Street Railway
- Detroit Electric Railway
- Detroit and Flint Railway
- Detroit, Fort Wayne and Belle Isle Railway
- Detroit, Howell and Lansing Railway
- Detroit and Lake St. Clair Railway
- Detroit, Lake Shore and Mt. Clemens Railway
- Detroit, Mount Clemens and Marine City Railway
- Detroit and Northwestern Railway
- Detroit, Plymouth and Northville Railway
- Detroit and Pontiac Railway
- Detroit and Port Huron Shore Line Railway
- Detroit and River St. Clair Railway
- Detroit, Rochester, Romeo and Lake Orion Railway
- Detroit and Toledo Shore Line Railroad
- Detroit, Ypsilanti and Ann Arbor Railway
- Detroit, Ypsilanti, Ann Arbor and Jackson Railway
- Detroit United Railway
- Detroit and Utica Railway
- Escanaba Electric Street Railway
- Grand Haven Street Railway
- Grand Rapids Railway
- Grand Rapids, Belding and Ionia Railway
- Grand Rapids and Chicago Railway
- Grand Rapids, Grand Haven and Muskegon Railway
- Grand Rapids, Holland and Lake Michigan Rapid Railway
- Grand Rapids and Saginaw Railroad
- Highland Park Railway
- Holland and Lake Michigan Railway
- Houghton County Traction Company
- Inter-Urban Railway
- Jackson and Ann Arbor Railway
- Jackson and Battle Creek Traction Company
- Jackson Street Railway
- Jackson and Suburban Traction Company
- Kalamazoo, Gull Lake and Northern Railroad
- Lansing City Railway
- Lansing City Electric Railway
- Lansing, Dexter and Ann Arbor Railway
- Lansing, St. Johns and St. Louis Railway
- Manistee, Filer City and Eastlake Railway
- Marinette Gas, Electric Light and Street Railway
- Marquette City and Presque Isle Railway
- Menominee Electric Light, Railway and Power Company
- Michigan Railroad (MRC)
- Michigan Railway
- Michigan Traction Company
- Michigan United Railways
- Mount Clemens and Lake Side Traction Company
- Muskegon Railway
- Muskegon Street Railway
- Muskegon Traction and Lighting Company
- Negaunee and Ishpeming Street Railroad
- Negaunee and Ishpeming Street Railway and Electric Company
- North Detroit Electric Railway
- Owosso and Corunna Electric Company
- Owosso and Corunna Traction Company
- Port Huron, St. Clair and Marine City
- Rapid Railroad
- Rapid Railway
- Saginaw Consolidated Street Railway
- Saginaw Suburban Railway
- Saginaw Valley Traction Company
- St. Joseph and Benton Harbor Street Railway
- Saugatuck, Douglass and Lake Shore Railway
- South Grand Rapids Street Railway
- South Haven and Paw Paw Lake Electric Railway
- Southern Michigan Traction Company
- Toledo, Adrian and Jackson Railway
- Trans-St. Mary's Traction Company
- Twin City General Electric Company
- Union Street Railway
- West Michigan Traction Company
- Wyandotte and Detroit River Railway

== Miniature railroads ==
=== Defunct ===
- Michigan AuSable Valley Railroad
