= Patterson Railroad =

Railroad in Michigan

The Patterson Railroad is a defunct railroad that existed in Michigan during the early 1870s. The company incorporated on September 21, 1870 and filed articles on October 3 to construct a line between Patterson Mills (now Belding) and Kiddville (defunct; lay to the north-east across the Flat River). The Patterson completed a 1.67-mile (2.69 km) in July 1872, at which point the property became part of the Detroit, Lansing and Lake Michigan Railroad, whose line it met at Kiddville. (Note: According to Meints, the company was "donated" on July 18.) The DL&M would later become part of the Pere Marquette Railroad, which also built a line (the Grand Rapids, Belding and Saginaw Railroad) south from Belding.

The Belding–Kidd line continued to exist throughout the 20th century, eventually becoming part of the Greenville–Lowell line operated by the Mid-Michigan Railroad, a RailAmerica company. In December 2007 Mid-Michigan petitioned the Surface Transportation Board to abandon the line. The grade is to be converted to a rail trail.
