= West Michigan Railroad =

Shortline railroad in Michigan

Overview
- Headquarters: Saugatuck, Michigan, U.S.
- Reporting mark: WMI
- Locale: Hartford, Michigan, U.S.
- Dates of operation: 1995–

Technical
- Track gauge: 4 ft 8 1/2 in (1,435 mm) standard gauge
- Length: 4.23 miles

The West Michigan Railroad (reporting mark WMI) is a shortline railroad in southwest Michigan. It began operations in 1995, replacing the bankrupt Kalamazoo, Lake Shore and Chicago Railroad (reporting mark KLSC) on an ex-Pere Marquette Railway line between Hartford and Paw Paw, Michigan. That company had taken over operations in 1987 from CSX Transportation.

Traffic on the West Michigan Railroad consists of canola pellets, plastic pellets, frozen food, refrigerated fresh food, stone, methanol, and corn oil.

The railroad has been owned by Hamilton Hartford Group, LLC, who also own and operate the Hamilton Northwestern Railroad, since 2015.

== History ==
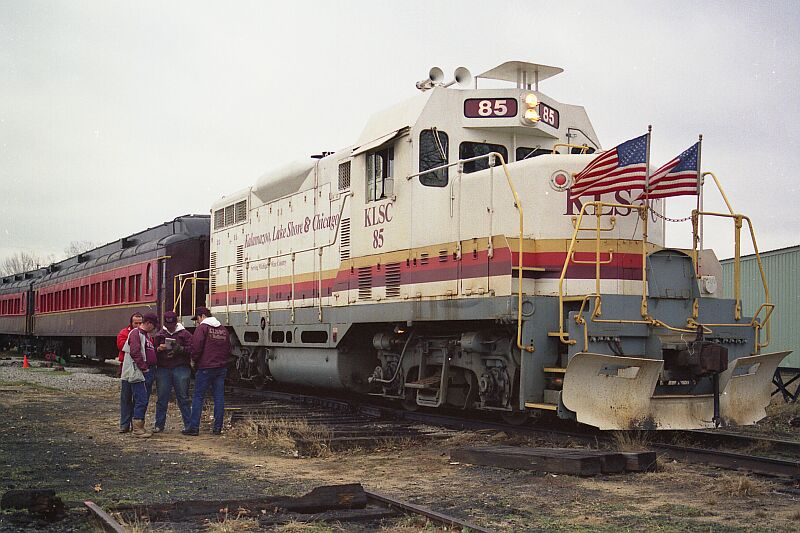
KLSC locomotive in 1988

The Toledo and South Haven Railroad, a predecessor of the Pere Marquette Railway, opened the line from Paw Paw west to Lawrence in October 1877 and to Hartford in March 1883, as an extension of an older line from Lawton to Paw Paw. It was initially built as 3 ft (914 mm) narrow gauge; the successor South Haven and Eastern Railroad standard gauged the line along with an extension from Hartford to South Haven, Michigan, in April and May 1899. The Pere Marquette gained control in April 1903, but the line temporarily left that system when the Kalamazoo, Lake Shore and Chicago Railway leased it in April 1907, intending to electrify it as an interurban. Michigan United Railways leased the line from 1911 to 1916; operations then reverted to the KLS&C until 1925, when the Pere Marquette took it back, having never been electrified. It abandoned the segment from Lawton to Paw Paw in 1942, and in August 1987 the Southwestern Michigan Railroad d/b/a Kalamazoo, Lake Shore and Chicago Railroad began operations between Paw Paw and Hartford. The Hartford to South Haven has also been abandoned.

Pioneer Railcorp subsidiary West Jersey Railroad Co. operated a Salem County-owned line between Swedesboro and Salem, New Jersey from September 1988 until May 1995, when the lease was reassigned to the Southern Railroad of New Jersey. Three months later, the West Jersey began operating, under a directed service order, the line of the KLS&C, which had entered Chapter 11 bankruptcy in March 1993 and suspended operations in May 1995. In October, the West Jersey Railroad changed its name to West Michigan Railroad, and later that month it bought the line. As of the fall of 2011, the railroad from Hartford to Paw Paw is all but abandoned. A filing with the Surface Transportation Board dated December 19, 2012 and numbered STB Docket No. AB-1107X requested abandonment of 10.67 miles of the line from Paw Paw west to a point west of 56th Street on the west side of Lawrence, Michigan.

Pioneer Railcorp sold the capital stock of West Michigan Railroad Co., effective at the close of business November 3, 2015, to an unaffiliated non-carrier entity, Hamilton Hartford Group, LLC, and PRC, therefore, is no longer in control of WMI. The new owners have identified a dozen potential customers who have expressed interest in hauling freight along the line.

Since the purchase of the railroad by Hamilton Hartford Group, traffic has increased immensely, with the vast majority of the growth coming from a transload facility which opened in 2019. In 2022, the railroad received an $8.7 million grant from the Federal Railroad Administration. This grant will allow the railroad to completely rebuild the existing track, as well as relay 5.6 miles of track along the abandoned right of way, returning rail service to the town of Lawrence.

== Locomotives ==
Number	Type	Build Date	Status	Notes
4	EMD SW9	11/1951	Out of service	Ex-Leelanau Scenic Railroad. Exx-Chesapeake and Ohio Railway. Named "Village of Suttons Bay".
850	ALCO C420	7/1966	Out of service	Ex-Iowa Interstate Railroad, Exx Lehigh and Hudson River Railroad.
921	EMD GP18	12/1959	In service	Ex-Norfolk and Western
1017	ALCO T6	1/1969	Out of service	Ex-Cargill. Exx-Newburgh & South Shore Railroad. Last ALCO locomotive built in the United States.
1512	EMD SW1200	3/1960	Out of service	Ex-Michigan Air-Line Railway. Exx-Coe Rail. Exxx-Grand Trunk Western Railroad
2480	EMD CF7	6/1956	Out of service	Ex-Clinton Terminal Railroad. Exx-Waccamaw Coast Line Railroad. Exxx-Atchison, Topeka and Santa Fe Railway. Originally built as an EMD F9.
4428	EMD GP9	8/1956	In service	Ex-Grand Trunk Western
