= Ionia and Lansing Railroad =

Railroad in Michigan

The Ionia and Lansing Rail Road is a defunct railroad which operated in the state of Michigan in the 1860s and 1870s. The company incorporated on November 13, 1865; the investors hailed primarily from Lansing, Ionia and Portland. The original charter called for a 34-mile (55 km) line from Ionia to Lansing; on January 13, 1869 this was amended with a much grander vision: a 125-mile (201 km) line from Lansing to the mouth of the Pentwater River at Pentwater, on the shores of Lake Michigan.

In late 1869 the I&L opened a line between Lansing and Ionia; the first trains ran in December. In September 1870 the line extended further north and west past Belding to Greenville. That year the road was bought out by James F. Joy and other Detroit investors who already controlled the Detroit, Howell & Lansing; on March 16, 1871 the two companies consolidated to form the Detroit, Lansing & Lake Michigan.

The I&L's finances appear to have been rocky throughout its short history. As the author of a study on the Pere Marquette Railway noted:

The Ionia and Lansing Railroad (sic) had difficulty in getting sufficient money to finish its construction and its credit was so bad that it received $770,000 of cash out of a bond issue with a par value of $1,820,000. Later on, in order to complete the line, it had to take on a second mortgage on its property from Lansing to Greenville.

Even as late as 1900, when the Pere Marquette consolidated the I&L's successor, the Detroit, Grand Rapids & Western, it assumed some of the old debt load.

Very little of the I&L's original Lansing–Greenville line exists today. In 1942 the Pere Marquette abandoned the Warden–Kidd segment; between 1972 and 1986 the C&O, successor the Pere Marquette, abandoned the Warden–Eagle segment, leaving only the Kidd–Greenville and Grand Ledge–Lansing segments. The latter is owned by CSX, while the former is owned by the Mid-Michigan Railroad, a RailAmerica company. In December 2007 Mid-Michigan petitioned the Surface Transportation Board to abandon the Lowell–Greenville section of its line, which includes Greenville–Kidd. The grade was converted to a rail trail.
