= Southern Rail =

Southern Rail may refer to

== United States ==
- Charlotte Southern Railroad
- California Southern Railroad
- Norfolk Southern Railway

== Australia ==
- Great Southern Rail Trail
- Journey Beyond, formerly Great Southern Rail

== United Kingdom ==
- Southern Railway (UK) (a historical railway in the South of England)
- Southern (Govia Thameslink Railway) (the current brand name for services on the Southern routes of the Thameslink, Southern & Great Northern franchise)
