= Michigan Railway =

Michigan Railway may refer to:

- Michigan Railway (electric), operators of Michigan United Railways lines until 1921
- Michigan Railway (1880), predecessor of the Grand Trunk Western Railroad
