= Lirr =

Lirr or LIRR may refer to:

- Long Island Rail Road, a commuter railroad on Long Island, New York, United States
- Lapeer Industrial Railroad, in Lapeer, Michigan
- Leeds Inner Ring Road, a motorway and A-road circling Leeds, West Yorkshire, England
- Lirr (Greyhawk), a goddess in the World of Greyhawk campaign setting for the Dungeons & Dragons roleplaying game
