= Lansing Manufacturers Railroad =

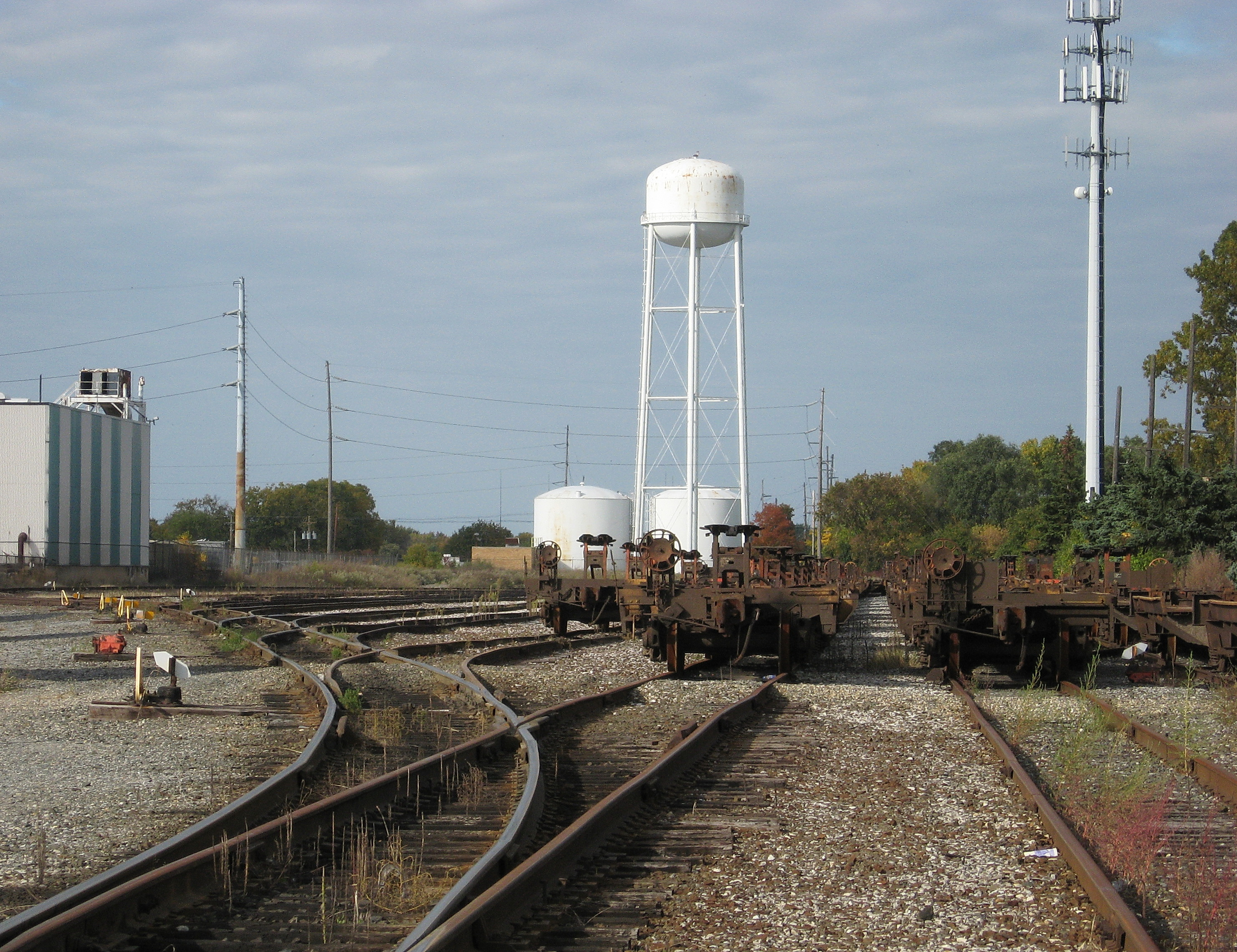
- Saginaw Yard, Lansing Manufacturers Railroad

Overview
- Headquarters: Lansing, Michigan
- Locale: Lansing, Michigan
- Dates of operation: 1904–1969
- Predecessor: None
- Successor: Penn Central

Technical
- Track gauge: 1,435 mm (4 ft 8 1/2 in) standard gauge
- Length: 5.14 miles (8.27 km)

Lansing Manufacturers Railroad was a beltline switching railroad organized in 1904 to connect Cornelius Vanderbilt's Michigan Central mainline on the north edge of Lansing, Michigan, to automotive factories on the west and south side of the city and to Sir Henry Tyler's Grand Trunk Railroad along the north bank of the Grand River. The company's 5.1-mile (8.2 km), C-shaped right of way lay entirely within the city limits. Important customers included GM's Reatta Craft Centre, Lansing Metal Center, and both plants of Lansing Car Assembly.

== History ==
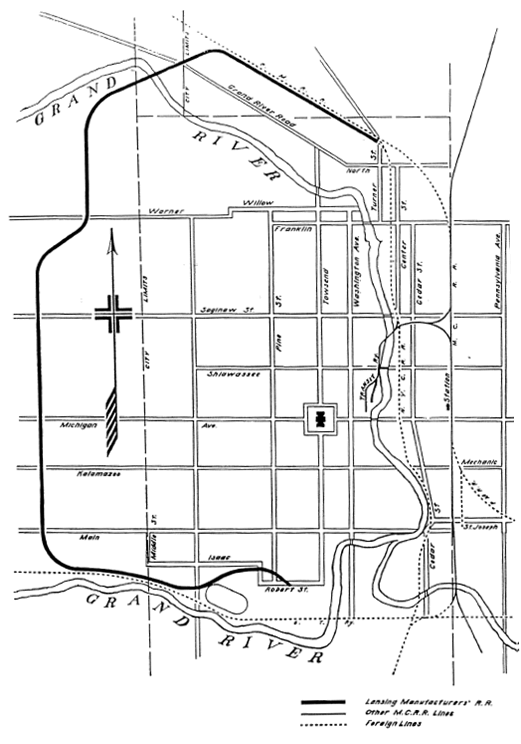
1916 Route Map

=== Corporate ===
Founded on August 30, 1904, with an authorized capital stock of $100,000, the LMR built its first three miles (5 km) of track during 1905. The founding owners were August Smith and Samuel L. Smith of Detroit, James B. Seager and S.F. Seager of Lansing, and James H. Seager of Houghton.

With an agreement signed May 29, 1905, and effective July 1, 1905, the LMR entered into a 25-year lease with the Michigan Central Railroad and Lake Shore and Michigan Southern Railway (later incorporated into the New York Central Railroad). The agreement called for annual lease payments of $7,500 plus $50 for expenses, and for the lessors to pay the interest on the LMR's $75,000 bonded debt. The Michigan Central was to operate the line and divide earnings and expenses evenly with the Lake Shore. At that time, the LMR's 7.96-mile (12.81 km) route encircled the city.

The New York Central Railroad became an equal partner in the lease with a December 29, 1905, agreement with the Michigan Central.

By the end of 1917, the total investment in road and equipment had reached $175,000. James H. Seager served as president, S.F. Seager as secretary/treasurer, and O.A. Jenison as superintendent. Both Seagers were also among the six directors, as was James B. Seager.

As part of the nationalization of American railroads during World War I, the LMR was taken over by the United States Railroad Administration on January 1, 1918, and operated under federal supervision as part of the New York Central and Michigan Central systems until March 1, 1920.

In order to protect their interests in this short but important rail link, in December 1919 the board of directors of the Michigan Central approved the acquisition of one half of the stock of the Lansing Manufacturers Railroad, and assumption of one half ($18,000) of the LMR's debt. The New York Central acquired the balance. From that point on, the LMR was a captive asset of the two larger railroads.

On July 1, 1930, the lease with the Michigan Central Railroad was renewed.

Even though its ownership was indirect, the New York Central's annual reports show ongoing investment in improvements on the LMR, albeit on a modest scale. For example, the 1932 report shows $8249.07 charged to the LMR.

The 1968 merger between the New York Central and the Pennsylvania Railroad, creating a PRR-dominated Penn Central Railroad, presaged a change in the ownership of the Lansing Manufacturers Railroad. In a merger completed on July 23, 1969, the LMR was acquired by Penndel, a Penn Central holding company. At the time, the par value of the LMR was still $100,000—the original 1000 shares at $100, half owned by Penn Central and half by Michigan Central (itself 99.88% owned by Penn Central by this time). Penndel paid $48,000 for the LMR. The merger was unanimously approved by the stockholders of both corporations on December 23, 1968, and approved by the Interstate Commerce Commission on June 11, 1969. As with the many other railroads owned by Penndel, the LMR was to be operated by Penn Central under the terms of a 1957 lease between it and Penndel.

After Penn Central's bankruptcy in 1970 and subsequent nationalization, the LMR became the property of Conrail. When CSX and Norfolk Southern purchased and divided up Conrail in 1999, the LMR became a Norfolk Southern property.

In 2010, the Adrian and Blissfield Railroad leased the "5.1-mile" Lansing Manufacturers Railroad from Norfolk Southern as part of the deal creating the 82-mile (132 km) Jackson and Lansing Railroad.

=== Operational ===
By 1920, the operators boasted the LMR "makes a complete circuit of the city, connecting all the steam and electric lines."

The Lansing Manufacturers Railroad and its successor operators built and serviced industrial spurs into many properties along its route. Among the most significant:

- At the Robert Street terminus: Olds Motor Works (1902-1908), which in time became a vast complex of General Motors facilities with twelve numbered tracks on site. The final customer was Lansing Car Assembly Plant #1, which was closed in 2005 and demolished in 2007. The Lansing Grand River plant now occupying this site does not receive rail service.
- Between West Street and Martin Luther King Avenue: New Hollow Yard, one of two nine-track flat-switched rail yards on the LMR, is found here. An interchange point with the Grand Trunk Railroad/Canadian National Flint Subdivision is just west of the New Hollow ladder.
- Between West Michigan Avenue and West Saginaw Street: a R.E. Olds foundry was built west of the tracks in 1919, and purchased by GM in 1940. During World War II artillery shells were made here. Beginning in 1988, the Reatta Craft Centre (also known as Buick-Oldsmobile Cadillac Division Plant No. 2) on this site built limited-production specialty vehicles such as the EV1 electric car and the Chevrolet SSR. The Craft Centre was closed in 2006, and demolished beginning in 2008. To the east, Durant Motor Works built a plant in 1920 which was taken over by GM in 1935. As many as five rail spurs served the GM facility, which was known at various times as Fisher Body, Lansing Car Assembly Plant No. 6, and, colloquially, "the Verlindin plant" after the adjoining street. Plant 6 was closed in 2005 and demolished beginning in 2007. Both sites are currently vacant.
- Between West Saginaw St. and West Willow St.: the Saginaw Yard sat adjacent to the Lansing Metal Center (also known as BOC Plant No. 3), a GM foundry that was built in 1952 as a jet engine manufacturing plant. There were two spurs onto the property, one from each end the yard lead, and a total of five numbered tracks within the plant. The 1,500,000-square-foot (140,000 m^{2}) foundry was closed in 2006 and demolition began two years later; the site is currently vacant.
- Between West Willow St. and the Grand River: LMR has serviced businesses along Comfort Street to the east (Alro Steel) and Sunset Avenue to the west (Padnos Metals, Summit Steel, Moseley's Equipment Repair).
- Between the Grand River and Turner Street: north terminus and interchange point with (in various eras) Pere Marquette/Michigan Central/Norfolk Southern/CSX.

New Hollow Yard was built in 1972–1973, largely supplanting the three-track double-ended Hollow Yard built in 1905 and located just to the west, between the Olds Avenue grade crossing and West Street. Hollow Yard took its name from the fact that it was an uphill climb both ways from the middle, creating some challenges for crews switching the yard or bringing a long cut of cars out of the Oldsmobile plant. Single-ended New Hollow Yard has its own switching issues, with an uphill lead feeding level body tracks.

In the Conrail era, the Lansing Manufacturers Railroad was designated as track 263 in Zone 73 of the Dearborn Division.
