= St. Joseph Valley Railroad =

There have been several railroads named for the St. Joseph Valley in southern Michigan and northern Indiana:

- St. Joseph Valley Railroad (1848–1869), predecessor of the New York Central Railroad in Michigan
- St. Joseph Valley Railroad (1869–1870), predecessor of the Michigan Central Railroad (New York Central Railroad) in Indiana
- St. Joseph Valley Railway (1889–1897), earlier St. Joseph Valley Railroad (1880–1889), predecessor of the Pere Marquette Railway in Michigan
- St. Joseph Valley Railway (1905), operator of the St. Joseph Valley Traction Company in Indiana
