= Mansfield, Coldwater and Lake Michigan Railroad =

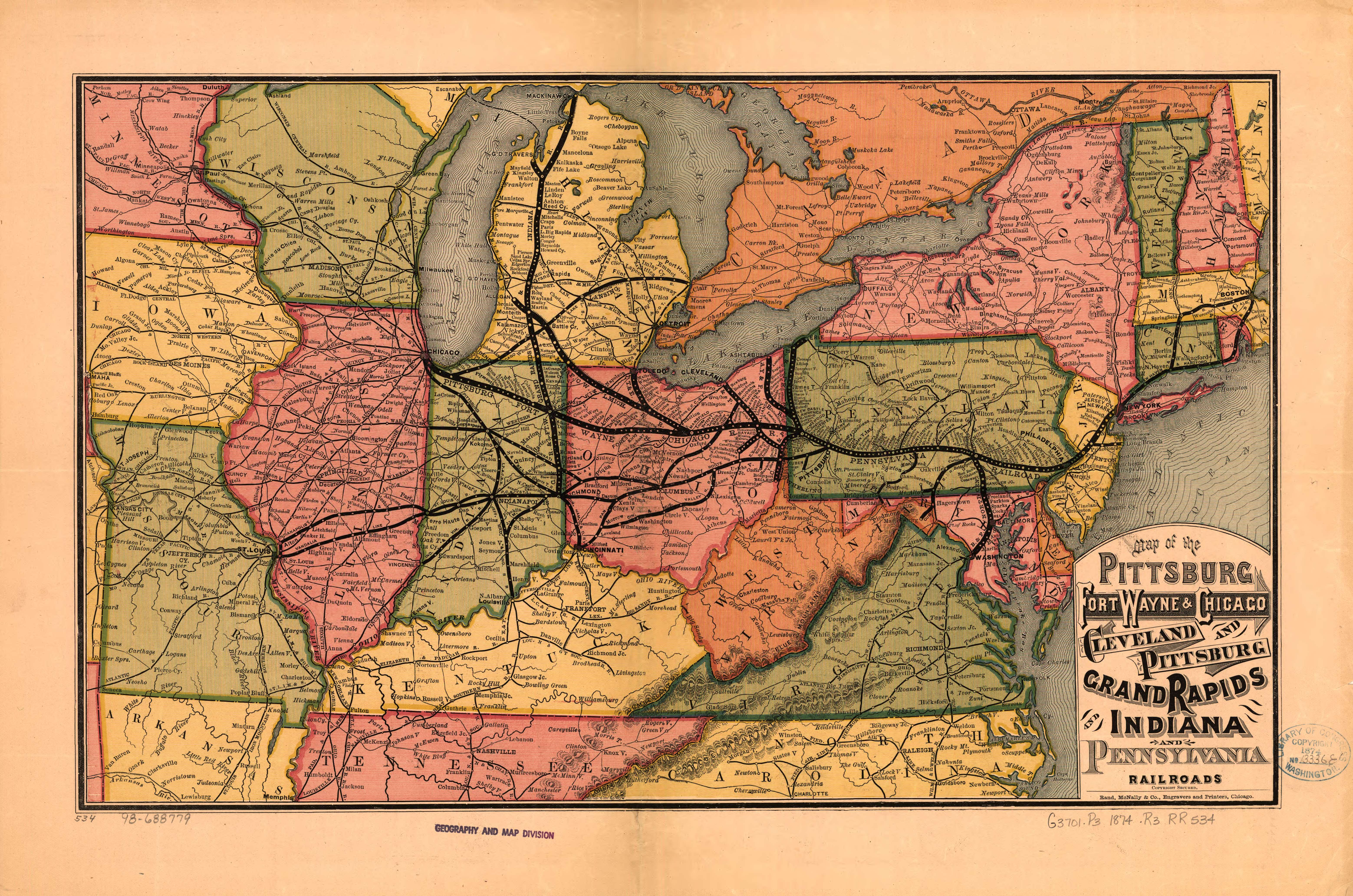
- Map of the Pennsylvania Railroad from 1874. The planned route of the MCW&LM from Mansfield to Allegan is shown, with hashmarks on the track indicating the incomplete stretch from Fostoria to Montieth.

Overview
- Locale: Ohio and Michigan

Technical
- Track gauge: 4 ft 8 1/2 in (1,435 mm) standard gauge

The Mansfield, Coldwater and Lake Michigan Railroad (MCW&LM) is a defunct railroad which operated in southern Michigan and Ohio during the 1870s. By the time it went into foreclosure in the late 1870s it owned two non-contiguous track segments, each of which was leased by a different company.

== Corporate history ==
The company formed on December 28, 1870 through the merger of the Ohio & Michigan Railway and the Mansfield, Coldwater & Lake Michigan Railway, neither of which had yet built track. On January 1, 1874, the Grand Rapids & Indiana leased the "Allegan Division" (Michigan holdings) of the line. On August 28, 1877, the company was sold at foreclosure: the Allegan & Southeastern bought the Allegan Division, while the Pennsylvania Railroad, which had controlled the Ohio properties since 1873 through the Pennsylvania Company, bought the Ohio holdings outright.

== Michigan ==
In September 1871 the MCW&LM completed an 11.2-mile (18.0 km) line from Allegan east to Montieth (south of Martin), where it met the GR&I. This constituted the "Allegan Division" of the line. When the GR&I leased the line in 1874 it took complete control of all operations.

The comparatively short segment of the "Allegan Division" enjoyed an unusual history. The MCW&LM had already completed, but not opened, an 8-mile (13 km) extension east from Montieth; the Allegan & Southeastern did not alter the situation during its short (1877–1883) stewardship of the line. Under the Michigan & Ohio (1883–1886), this line was extended another 113.7 miles (183.0 km) to Dundee, but by 1937 this extension had been abandoned. In 1913 the Detroit, Toledo & Milwaukee, the then current owner of the Allegan–Dundee line, sold the Allegan–Battle Creek section, which included the old MCW&LM line, to the Michigan & Chicago, an interurban, which electrified the line. The successor to the M&C, the Michigan United, abandoned the Allegan–Montieth section in 1928.

== Ohio ==
At the same time the main part of the MCW&LM, under the control of the Pennsylvania Railroad (PRR), was constructing a 216-mile (348 km) line from Mansfield, Ohio (where it met the Pittsburgh, Fort Wayne and Chicago) northwest toward Allegan. By 1874 a 49.7-mile (80.0 km) line from Toledo Junction (near Mansfield) via Tiffin to Fostoria was complete. The prime contractor for this line was Joseph Fisk (1810–1874), who built over 1,000 miles (1,600 km) of track in the Midwest during his long career. Although controlled by the PRR, MCW&LM trains operated this section under their own flag.

Although substantial portions of the northwestern extension were graded, most of the track was never laid. The PRR abandoned the idea in 1875 and instead focused on a route north from Tiffin into Toledo, Ohio. To that end, in 1877 the PRR merged the Ohio portion of the MCW&LM with the Toledo, Tiffin & Eastern and the Toledo & Woodville into the Northwestern Ohio Railway, which the PRR in turn leased. The 79-mile (127 km) line linked the PRR's massive network to Toledo for the first time. (Note: Other sources put the length at 86 miles (138 km); this may depend on whether the section from Mansfield proper to Toledo Junction is included.)
