= Northern Central Michigan Railroad =

Overview
- Headquarters: Kalamazoo, Michigan, U.S.
- Dates of operation: 1866–1914
- Successor: Lake Shore and Michigan Southern Railway (1871); New York Central Railroad (1914)

Technical
- Length: 141.1 miles (227.1 km)

The Northern Central Michigan Railroad (NCMR) was a railroad line in the U.S. state of Michigan. The line ran from Lansing to Jonesville, then returned north from Jonesville to Albion and Eaton Rapids before closing the loop in Lansing. The NCMR had a short life as an independent company, becoming part of the Lake Shore and Michigan Southern Railway in 1871 and then consolidating with the New York Central Railroad in 1914.

== History ==
Grand River Valley Railroad was chartered by the state of Michigan in 1846. Its route was from Grand Rapids to Eaton Rapids, passing southeast through the towns of Charlotte and Hastings. Despite the date of its charter, the road did not begin operating until July 4, 1870.

In 1863, the Lake Shore and Michigan Southern Railway (LS&MS) was granted a right of way by the state for a rail line from North Lansing south to Jonesville. Only a single mile of track, from North Lansing to Lansing, were built. In 1866, the rights to the Lansing-Jonesville section were transferred by the state to the Northern Central Michigan Railroad (NCMR), which incorporated on November 12, 1866. The new company's headquarters were in Kalamazoo.

The NCMR's stock was purchased by the LS&MS in 1871, ending the railroads short life as an independent company. The LS&MS operated the road, and installed its own directors as directors and officers of the North Central. With capital infusion from the LS&MS, the NCMR was extended from Jonesville to Albion on January 7, 1872, and the line reached Eaton Rapids on September 30, 1872. After a brief hiatus in construction, the line was extended back to Lansing, reaching completion on January 13, 1873. Total length of the line was 141.1 miles (227.1 km).

On May 1, 1897, the NCMR leased all its rights of way, track, and equipment to the LS&MS for a nominal rent for the rest of its corporate life.

The New York Central and Hudson River Railroad had acquired a controlling majority of the LS&MS in 1877. In 1914, the asset restructuring and refinancing of the New York Central led to the abolishment of all subsidiary corporations and their consolidation into the new New York Central Railroad. This ended the corporate existence for the NCMR.

Portions of the original trackage still exist, although most has long been torn up. One portion, between Lansing and Jackson, is owned and operated by the Jackson & Lansing Railroad, a subsidiary of the Adrian and Blissfield Rail Road. Another short segment of track, owned and operated by the Indiana Northeastern Railroad, exists between Jonesville and Litchfield.

== Bibliography ==
- Everett, Franklin (1878). Memorials of the Grand River Valley. Chicago: The Chicago Legal News Company.
- Leavy, Michael (2006). The New York Central System. Charleston, S.C.: Arcadia Publishing. ISBN 9780738549286.
- Michigan Railroad Commission (1874). First Annual Report of the Commissioner of Railroads of the State of Michigan, for the Year Ending December 31, 1872. Lansing, Mich.: W.S. George and Co., State Printers and Binders. hdl:2027/mdp.39015065192448.
- Michigan Railroad Commission (1899). Supplementary Report of the Commissioner of Railroads of the State of Michigan, for the Year 1899. Lansing, Mich.: Wynkoop Hallenbeck Crawford Co. of Lansing, Mich., State Printers.
- Michigan Railroad Commission (1919). Aids, Gifts, Grants and Donations to Railroads Including Outline of Development and Succession in Titles to Railroads in Michigan. Lansing, Mich.: Wynkoop Hallenbeck Crawford Co.
- Moody, John (1917). Moody's Analysis of Investments. Part I - Steam Railroads. Eighth Annual Number. New York: Moody's Investors Service.
- Munn, W. Scott (1952). The Only Eaton Rapids on Earth: The Pioneer History of Eaton Rapids and Hamlin Townships With Reminiscences. Ann Arbor, Mich.: Edwards Bros.
