= James Frederick Joy =

American railroad executive and politician (1810–1896)

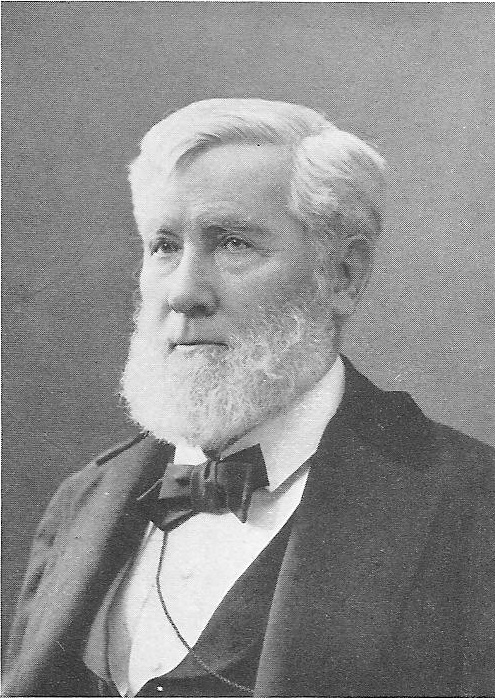

Member of the Michigan House of Representatives from the Wayne County 1st district
- In office January 1, 1861 – December 31, 1862

Regent of the University of Michigan
- In office January 1, 1882 – December 24, 1886
- Preceded by: E. C. Walker
- Succeeded by: Charles S. Draper

Personal details
- Born: December 2, 1810 Durham, New Hampshire
- Died: September 24, 1896 (aged 85) Detroit, Michigan
- Resting place: Elmwood Cemetery, Detroit, Michigan
- Party: Republican
- Other political affiliations: Whig; Free Soil
- Children: Henry Bourne Joy
- Parent(s): James Joy and Sarah Gee Pickering
- Education: Dartmouth College (1833), Harvard Law School (1836)
- Occupation: Lawyer, railroad magnate, politician
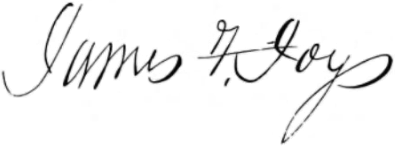
- Signature

James Frederick Joy (December 2, 1810 – September 24, 1896) was an American railroad magnate and politician in Detroit, Michigan.

== Beginnings ==
He was born in Durham, New Hampshire, the son of James Joy (1778–1857) of Groton, Massachusetts and Sarah Gee Pickering (1781–1858), daughter of John Pickering.

== Education and early career ==
Educated in Durham, New Hampshire, he entered Dartmouth College, graduating in 1833. From Dartmouth he entered Harvard Law School, from which he graduated in 1836. That year he moved to Detroit and formed a law firm with George F. Porter.

== Railroad magnate ==
In 1846 he entered the railroad business as the lawyer and general counsel to the Michigan Central Railroad. He was subsequently connected with the Illinois Central Railroad. Joy organized the Chicago, Burlington and Quincy Railroad, and was for many years its president. Joy was for several years president of the Wabash, St. Louis and Pacific Railway.

In 1872 he was president and a director of the Michigan Central Railroad, drawing a salary of $8,000 (~$215,000 in 2025) per year. He was at the same time president and a director of the Chicago and Michigan Lake Shore Railroad, and a director of the Detroit, Hillsdale and Indiana Railroad. In 1873 he became president and a director of the Detroit, Lansing and Lake Michigan Railroad, taking over from H.H. Smith. He became president and treasurer of the Detroit Union Railway Depot and Station company at Detroit, Michigan.

== Politics ==
Joy was intimately involved with politics from his early career. A member of the Whig Party and subsequently a Republican, for a time he had also been a member of the Free Soil Party. He was a close friend, confidant and supporter of Abraham Lincoln. At the 1880 Republican National Convention, he gave a speech nominating James G. Blaine for president.

In 1860, he was elected a state representative in the Michigan Legislature, representing Wayne County's 1st district from 1861 to 1862. He was later elected a Regent of the University of Michigan, serving from 1882 to 1886, when he resigned the office.

He died at his home in Detroit on September 24, 1896.
