= Grand Rapids and Lake Shore Railroad =

Railroad in Michigan

Overview
- Locale: Michigan, United States
- Dates of operation: 1870–1870
- Successor: Chicago and Michigan Lake Shore Railroad

The Grand Rapids and Lake Shore Railroad Company was organized to build a railroad from Grand Rapids to Pentwater, Michigan. The corporation was organized by Lowell Hall and other Grand Rapids businessmen. The company's bonds of $16,000 per mile were endorsed by the Michigan Central Railroad in January 1870, and much of the early construction was performed by Michigan Central crews treating it as an extension of that company's Grand River Valley branch. By May, officials had extended their plans to build to Manistee, and the company projected construction reaching Pentwater by November. Track was completed between Nunica and Muskegon in 1870.

In Nunica, the line connected to the Detroit & Milwaukee Railroad (D&M). Running rights on the D&M allowed trains to operate between Grand Rapids and Muskegon, via Fruitport.

In late 1870, the Grand Rapids & Lake Shore was absorbed into the Chicago and Michigan Lake Shore Railroad (C&MLS), which was building a line north from New Buffalo. In December, 1870, regular service between Grand Rapids and Muskegon was begun, under the C&MLS name.

In 1871, the Chicago and Michigan Lake Shore completed its line between Holland and Nunica. This line crossed the Grand River at Spoonville, and continued north to the connection in Nunica.
