= Kalamazoo and White Pigeon Railroad =

Shortline railroad in Michigan

Overview
- Parent company: Lake Shore and Michigan Southern Railway
- Headquarters: Kalamazoo, Michigan, U.S.
- Dates of operation: 1869–1914
- Predecessor: Schoolcraft and Three Rivers Railroad; Kalamazoo and Schoolcraft Railroad
- Successor: New York Central Railroad

Technical
- Track gauge: 4 ft 8 1/2 in (1,435 mm) standard gauge
- Length: 38 miles (61 km)

The Kalamazoo and White Pigeon Railroad (K&WP) was a shortline railroad in the U.S. state of Michigan. It was incorporated in 1869 and consolidated with the New York Central Railroad in 1914. Its line ran from Kalamazoo, Michigan, to Constantine, Michigan.

== History ==
On April 3, 1848, the state of Michigan enacted legislation chartering the St. Joseph Valley Railroad. Its charter permitted it to build a single or double track from St. Joseph, Michigan, southeast to Cassopolis, Michigan, and thence northeast, east, or southeast to any point in St. Joseph County, Michigan. The company had to commence work in five years, and finish its line within ten years, or forfeit its charter. The Michigan Southern Railroad was barred by its charter from constructing a line within 3 miles (4.8 km) from the Michigan-Indiana border. So the Michigan Southern purchased most of the stock of the St. Joseph Valley, which allowed that line to begin work. The St. Joseph Valley began work in White Pigeon, Michigan, and by 1852 had built a single-track line to Constantine, Michigan. It extended the line to Three Rivers, Michigan, in 1855. Having run out of money, the St. Joseph won an extension from the Michigan Legislature on March 15, 1861, giving it more time to finish the line to St. Joseph. It won a second deadline extension from the legislature on March 17, 1863. The entire line was standard gauge.

On June 6, 1855, the Schoolcraft and Three Rivers Railroad was incorporated in the state of Michigan. Its charter allowed it to build a 13-mile (21 km) line from Three Rivers north to Schoolcraft, Michigan. Construction did not begin immediately, however. Instead, the company sought permission from the state legislature to purchase the stalled St. Joseph Valley Railroad. The legislature enacted a bill on March 18, 1865, authorizing the purchase. Work now began on building the standard-gauge line from Schoolcraft south. This line opened on May 3, 1867, and the Schoolcraft and Three Rivers merged with the St. Joseph Valley on August 14, 1869.

On June 9, 1866, the Kalamazoo and Schoolcraft Railroad was incorporated in the state of Michigan. Its charter allowed it to build a 14-mile (23 km) line from Kalamazoo, Michigan, south to Schoolcraft. This standard-gauge line was completed on May 3, 1867. With the completion of the Schoolcraft and Three Rivers on the same date, the line now extended from Kalamazoo all the way south to White Pigeon and the Indiana border.

The Kalamazoo and White Pigeon Railroad was formed on August 14, 1869, by the merger of the newly-enlarged St. Joseph Valley Railroad and the Kalamazoo and Schoolcraft Railroad.

=== Later ownership ===
On October 1, 1869, the Lake Shore and Michigan Southern Railway (LS&MS; which had formed from the amalgamation of the Michigan Southern and the Cleveland, Painesville and Ashtabula Railroad on April 6, 1869) leased the K&WP in perpetuity. The terms of the lease stipulated that the LS&MS assume payment on the K&WP's debt and purchase its equipment at market value.

The New York Central and Hudson River Railroad acquired a controlling majority of the LS&MS in 1877. On April 29, 1914, the asset restructuring and refinancing of the New York Central and Hudson River led to the abolishment of all subsidiary corporations and their consolidation into the new New York Central Railroad. The K&WP merged into the New York Central effective January 1, 1915.

== Post-K&WP track ownership ==
Now called the Kalamazoo Branch of the New York Central, passenger service ran on the White Piegon-to-Kalamazoo line until December 27, 1937.

Subject to intense competition and dwindling passenger and freight traffic, the New York Central Railroad merged with the Pennsylvania Railroad on February 1, 1968, to create the Penn Central Transportation Company. The merged company immediately began cost-cutting, but losses mounted. The Penn Central declared bankruptcy on June 21, 1970.

The Penn Central continued to operate into 1974, until President Richard Nixon signed the Regional Rail Reorganization Act on January 2. Most (but not all) of the Penn Central's tracks were turned over to a new corporation, Conrail. The Penn Central continued to operate as a freight-only railroad, but reorganization efforts failed. In March 1976, Railroad Revitalization and Regulatory Reform Act folded the remainder of the Penn Central into Conrail as well.

Conrail upgraded the 33 miles (53 km) of the Kalamazoo Branch between Elkhart, Indiana, and CP Park (a siding just south of Moorepark, Michigan) in the late 1970s. The unimproved track between CP Park and Kalamazoo was now named the Kalamazoo Secondary Branch.

In 1997, Conrail was jointly purchased by CSX and the Norfolk Southern Railway. The Norfolk Southern (NS) ended up owning the Kalamazoo Branch and Kalamazoo Secondary Branch. The NS leased the Kalamazoo Branch and Kalamazoo Secondary Branch to the Grand Elk Railroad, a regional freight railway, in 2009.

== Bibliography ==
- Borkowski, Richard C. (2008). Norfolk Southern Railway. Minneapolis: MBI Publishing Co. and Voyageur Press. ISBN 9780760332498.
- Durant, Samuel W. (1880). History of Kalamazoo County, Michigan. Philadelphia: Evertts & Abbott.
- Ellis, Franklin; Johnson, Crisfield (1880). History of Berrien and Van Buren Counties, Michigan. Philadelphia: D.W. Ensign & Co.
- History of St. Joseph County, Michigan. Philadelphia: L.H. Everts. 1877.
- Leavy, Michael (2006). The New York Central System. Charleston, S.C.: Arcadia Publishing. ISBN 9780738549286.
- Meints, Graydon M. (1992). Michigan Railroads and Railroad Companies. East Lansing, Mich.: Michigan State University Press. ISBN 9780870133183.
- Michigan Railroad Commission (1874). First Annual Report of the Commissioner of Railroads of the State of Michigan, for the Year Ending December 31, 1872. Lansing, Mich.: W.S. George and Co., State Printers and Binders. hdl:2027/mdp.39015065192448.
- Moody, John (1917). Moody's Analysis of Investments. Part I - Steam Railroads. Eighth Annual Number. New York: Moody's Investors Service.
- Ohio Commissioner of Railroads and Telegraphs (1875). Eighth Annual Report of the Commissioner of Railroads and Telegraphs of Ohio for the Year Ending June 30, 1874. Columbus, Ohio: Nevins and Myers, State Printers.
- Pennsylvania Secretary of Internal Affairs (1883). Annual Report of the Secretary of Internal Affairs of the Commonwealth of Pennsylvania. Part IV: Railroad, Canal, Navigation, Telegraph and Telephone Companies for the Year 1882. Harrisburg, Pa.: Lane S. Hart, State Printer & Binder.
- Sanders, Craig (2006). Amtrak in the Heartland. Bloomington, Ind.: Indiana University Press. ISBN 9780253347053.
