= Grand Rapids, Belding and Saginaw Railroad =

Railroad in Michigan

Overview
- Locale: Western Michigan
- Dates of operation: 1898–1903
- Predecessor: Lowell and Hastings Railroad
- Successor: Pere Marquette Railroad

Technical
- Track gauge: 4 ft 8 1/2 in (1,435 mm) standard gauge
- Length: 28.9 miles (46.5 km)

The Grand Rapids, Belding and Saginaw Railroad is a defunct railroad which operated in the state of Michigan at the turn of the 20th century.

The company formed on September 26, 1898, with the intention of owning a 44-mile (71 km) line from Greenville to Hastings via Belding, Lowell and Freeport. Some parts of this line existed already: the Detroit, Grand Rapids & Western operated a branch line between Greenville and Belding, while the Lowell & Hastings operated a line from Freeport to Lowell. Not yet built were the Lowell–Belding (in Kent and Montcalm county) and Freeport–Hastings (in Barry county) sections.

The company took its first step in May 1899 when it bought the Lowell & Hastings, giving it a 13-mile (21 km) line. On January 1, 1900 the company opened 15.9 miles (25.6 km) from Lowell to Belding, where it met the Pere Marquette, the successor company to the DGR&W. As built the line followed the course of the Flat River along its west bank, eventually crossing it in Belding itself. The Pere Marquette promptly took control of the line and administered it until 1903, when it bought the company outright. The Hastings–Freeport line was never realized; as of 2008 neither town has a railroad connection.

The Pere Marquette operated the Freeport–Belding line as part of a longer line which ran through Greenville northeast to Edmore. It abandoned the section south of Elmdale (Freeport–Elmdale) in 1935. The remainder eventually passed to CSX Transportation, which sold it to the Mid-Michigan Railroad (MMRR). The MMRR has requested permission from the Surface Transportation Board to abandon the remainder of the line (Greenville–Lowell). The stub from Lowell to Malta across the Grand River, which connects Lowell to the rest of Michigan's railroad network, remains in operation, while RailTex abandoned the remaining southern leg from Malta to Elmdale in 1997.
