= Holly, Wayne and Monroe Railway =

The Holly, Wayne and Monroe Railway (HW&M) is a defunct railroad which operated in southeast Michigan during the early 1870s. Although the company was chartered in 1865, construction from Holly toward Monroe did not begin until 1870. The company had experienced financial difficulties, and apparently received help from the Flint and Pere Marquette Railroad (F&PM) before the latter bought it out in 1872. The line reached Milford, Novi, Northville and Plymouth (where it crossed the Detroit, Lansing and Lake Michigan Rail Road) in 1871, and Monroe in 1872. That same year the F&PM bought the HW&M, and it ceased to exist as an independent company.
