= Detroit, Lansing and Northern Railroad =

Railroad in Michigan

Detroit, Lansing & Northern
Overview
- Headquarters: Boston, Massachusetts and Grand Rapids, Michigan
- Dates of operation: 1876–1896
- Predecessor: Detroit, Lansing & Lake Michigan
- Successor: Detroit, Grand Rapids & Western

Technical
- Track gauge: 4 ft 8 1/2 in (1,435 mm) standard gauge
- Length: 338 mi (544 km) (1895)

The Detroit, Lansing and Northern Railroad (DL&N) is a defunct railroad which was formed on December 27, 1876 as a reorganization of the foreclosed Detroit, Lansing and Lake Michigan Rail Road. The segment of its main line from Detroit to Lansing became an important component of the Pere Marquette Railroad, organized in 1900, and is still in use by CSX.

== History ==
=== Corporate ===
The Detroit, Lansing and Lake Michigan (DL&LM) was incorporated on April 11, 1871, as a consolidation of the Detroit, Howell and Lansing Railroad and the Ionia and Lansing Railroad. In 1872, the Ionia, Stanton and Northern Rail Road was added. By 1876 the railroad was obliged to pay more than $6 million in mortgages at 8%, much of it owed to men sitting on the Board of Directors, and had an operating deficit of more than $1.8 million, much of it representing unpaid interest.

DL&LM's lenders foreclosed in April 1876. George O. Shauttuck and J. Lewis Stackpole of Boston--acting as trustees for the lenders--purchased the railroad for $60,000 at a mortgage sale in Detroit on December 14, 1876. A new corporation was organized on December 27, 1876 under the name Detroit, Lansing and Northern Railroad, with most of its stock going to the lenders in exchange for their forgiving the DL&LM's debts. The only Michigan resident among the eleven directors named to the first board was James Joy, formerly president of the BL&LM. Declared business objectives of the DL&N were:

- to extend the mainline to Pentwater, on Lake Michigan
- to extend the Stanton line to join the Flint and Pere Marquette Railroad at Chippewa
- to pay a 7% annual dividend on its preferred stock.

In 1882, the principal officers were Alpheus Hardy, president; Thomas Fish, general superintendent; and J.J. McVean, engineer. The DL&N had over 1000 employees in Michigan, but none of its 438 stockholders or eleven directors were Michigan residents. Though profitable, the railroad had taken on debts equivalent to $15,897 for every mile of track over which it operated.

The railroad withstood the Panic of 1893, and as late as 1895 was still profitable, with an expense-to-earnings ratio of 81.78. The principal mortgage of $2.67 million at 7% was payable in 1907. Total debt per mile owned and operated (221.57) had climbed to $19,158. President of the railroad as 1896 began was Nathaniel Thayer, the general superintendent was J.K.V. Agnew, and chief engineer was J.J. McVean.

The DL&N went into receivership on April 1, 1896, and was reorganized as the Detroit, Grand Rapids and Western Railroad on January 1, 1897. The DGR&W also consolidated the Grand Rapids, Lansing & Detroit, Saginaw Valley & St. Louis, Saginaw & Grand Rapids, and the Saginaw & Western. On December 7, 1899, it became part of the new Pere Marquette Railway.

=== Operational ===
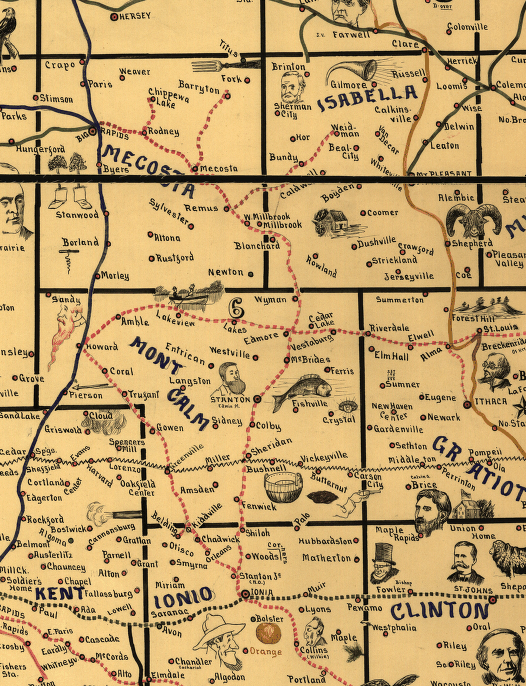
DL&N route map from Gailbraith Service Map, 1897

At its inception in December 1876, the DL&N inherited 206 miles (332 km) of track, more than 10,000 feet (3,048 m) of wooden bridges and trestles, 26 locomotives, and more than 750 railcars of all types. In 1876, its predecessor had carried more than 250,000 passengers and 260,000 short tons (240,000 t) of freight. The tracks over which they ran had become operational as follows:

Main Line (160.6 miles or 258.5 kilometers)

- Detroit to Lansing, August 1871
- Lansing to Ionia, December 1869
- Ionia to Greenville, September 1870
- Greenville to Howard City, August 1871

Branch Line (20.9 miles or 33.6 kilometers)

- Ionia to Stanton, February 1873

At Howard City, the main line connected to the Grand Rapids and Indiana Railroad (GR&I).

The DL&N extended the Stanton branch to McBride in 1877 and the next year to Blanchard. In July 1880 the branch was completed to Big Rapids, Michigan, where the DL&N made a second connection to the GR&I.

In 1882, the DL&N acquired a lease in perpetuity to the assets of the Saginaw & Western Railroad, which had gone into receivership under the name Chicago, Saginaw and Canada Railroad. By this time, DL&N trains were logging more than 1.4 million miles (2,300,000 km) a year over 225 miles (362 km) of track, carrying more than 635,000 passengers and 743,000 short tons (674,000 t) of freight.

The railroad reported 268 miles (431 km) (operating miles) in 1886, with the most significant addition being the Saginaw & Western's 42-mile (68 km) branch from Howard City to Alma, which provided an interchange with the Toledo, Ann Arbor and North Michigan Railroad. The freight traffic was overwhelmingly (62%) lumber and forest products, as the logging off of Michigan's old-growth forest continued to accelerate thanks to mechanization. A conversion to automatic couplers, mandated by an 1885 state law, was underway, and Westinghouse air brakes had appeared.

In August, 1888, two new rail segments built by the Grand Rapids, Lansing and Detroit Railroad and immediately leased by the DL&N went into service. The first was a 53-mile (85 km) line from Grand Ledge to Grand Rapids. The second was the Ramona Branch, a short extension from Oakdale Park Station to Reeds Lake, later East Grand Rapids, Michigan to serve the resorts there.

In the railroad's last full year of operation, it carried nearly 643,000 passengers, with the average trip 31 miles (50 km). Freight traffic had fallen to 541,000 short tons (491,000 t), with 36% of it lumber and forest products, and another 13% coal.

== Timetable ==
As of 1881, the DL&N main line served the following communities:

- Detroit
- Grand Trunk (GT) Junction
- Plymouth
- Flint & Pere Marquette (F&PM) Crossing
- Salem
- South Lyon
- Brighton
- Howell
- Fowlerville
- Webberville
- Williamston
- Lansing
- North Lansing
- Grand Ledge
- Portland
- Lyons
- Ionia
- Kiddville
- Belding
- Greenville
- Gowen
- Trufant
- Maple Valley
- Coral
- Howard City
