= Tecumseh Branch Connecting Railroad =

Overview
- Reporting mark: TCBY
- Dates of operation: 2001–2009
- Predecessor: Norfolk Southern
- Successor: Adrian and Blissfield Rail Road

Technical
- Track gauge: 4 ft 8 1/2 in (1,435 mm) standard gauge
- Length: 2.1 miles

The Tecumseh Branch Connecting Railroad is a railroad originally built by the Detroit, Toledo and Ironton Railroad. It was acquired by the Adrian and Blissfield Rail Road in Lenawee County, Michigan. The Adrian and Blissfield Rail Road filed to abandon the Tecumseh Branch Connecting Railroad as of June 2010.

According to the President of the Tecumseh Branch Connecting Railroad, Mark W. Dobronski, the company has not yet been dissolved. He says that the company is an inactive corporation. It has no bank accounts. It owns no real property. It owns no personal property. It has no account receivable. It has no accounts payable. It is conducting no business at this time.

TBCR has not yet been dissolved as the corporation is waiting an appropriate period of time to honor any outstanding claims which may exist against it, if any, and to conduct an orderly winding down of the business and, ultimately, dissolution of the company. During the time it was operating the TBCR never had any employees, with all services provided by the employees of the ADBF.
