= East Jordan and Southern Railroad =

The East Jordan and Southern Railroad was a shortline railroad that operated from 1901 to 1961 between East Jordan and Bellaire, Michigan.

== History ==
During the lumbering era of the late 19th and early 20th centuries, the area around the Jordan River was a prime spot for lumbering. The East Jordan & Southern's main purpose of creation was to haul the harvested lumber from the Hitchcock lumber camp to Bellaire where the logs would be transported by the Chicago and West Michigan Railroad to various sawmills. Along with the lumber industry, the East Jordan Iron Works also provided a large sum of the railroad's profits. After the lumber ran out during the 1920s, the railroad became more and more reliant on the industry in East Jordan and Bellaire for business. This was so until the East Jordan Iron Works decided to stop operating the railroad in August, 1961, and the line was subsequently abandoned.

Two crossroads on the line south and west over the ancient sand dunes to Bellaire were named Marble, and Mount Bliss Most likely these were flag stops so a passenger would have to wait in the general store until the train whistled and came chugging into town. Everyone in the store that was waiting for the train would scurry out and pay their fare and ride the train. Many of the school children commuted on this train for high school classes and the families would have paid a fee for attending the East Jordan High School rather than attend small country schools.

== The railroad today ==
The railroad tracks are gone, but most of the ties of the former railroad grade are still intact. As for Hitchcock, many small foundations can be found where the camp once stood. The Depot in East Jordan also still stands.
