= Empire and Southeastern Railroad =

The Empire and Southeastern Railroad was a railroad company in Michigan. From 1901 to 1923, it operated a standard gauge main line of 11.35 miles length that connected the town of Empire with the Manistee and North-Eastern Railroad's (MNE) Platte River Branch at Empire Junction, a station in the forest that served primarily as transfer point between the two railroads. The Empire & Southeastern also had a three mile branch to the shore of Pearl Lake that was mainly used for logging purposes.

== History ==
The railroad company was owned by the Empire Lumber Co., which was founded in 1887. It started out as logging railroad without connections to any other rail lines in the late 19th century. When the MNE opened its Platte River Branch to Honor in December 1898, a rail connection to the nation-wide network was available not far away. The two companies agreed to build a common station north of Honor that was called Empire Junction. The MNE owned and operated the station, but it was used by Empire & Southeastern trains as well. The extension to the junction went into service on July 18, 1901. MNE passenger trains now went as far as the junction, and a connecting service was operated from there to Empire by the Empire & Southeastern. There were two pairs of trains in the early years of this service, which did not run on Sundays. Travel time between Empire and the junction varied between 35 and 50 minutes.

The Empire & Southeastern started to publish its own timetables only in 1913. Before that, the line was included in the MNE Platte River Branch timetables. Effective September 25, 1916, passenger service was cut back to one pair of trains, on both the Platte River Branch and the Empire & Southeastern. From 1919, passenger service to Empire was from April to October only. With the 1920 season, beginning April 1 that year, the train was operated only on Tuesdays and Saturdays, and in the 1921 season it ran only on Fridays. Passenger service was discontinued on the Empire & Southeastern with the end of the 1921 season, and the trackage was abandoned by 1923. The freight-only branch to Pearl Lake might have been abandoned a few years earlier already, as it was only mentioned in the timetables until 1917. The MNE still operated its passenger train to Empire Junction on an irregular schedule on the first Tuesday of each month in 1922, but no continuing service to Empire was mentioned at that time. MNE discontinued this service by September 23, 1923, and abandoned the entire Platte River Branch in the same year.

== Route ==
The terminus in Empire was situated on the shore of Lake Michigan, right next to the beach, south of the Manning Memorial Light. The tracks went north along the beach and immediately turned east, crossing South Bar Lake on a trestle. The foundations of the trestle are still visible in the water. The line continued due east out of the town. A part of the alignment is now used by the West Empire Highway. East of Fredrickson Road, the right-of-way leaves the highway and runs first in a southeasterly direction before turning south. Near the county line between Leelanau County and Benzie County, the branch to Pearl Lake left the main line to the southeast. The junction was called Lake Junction. The main line continued south-southwest and reached its southern terminus at Empire Junction, which also served as the northern terminus of the MNE's Platte River Branch.
