= Detroit Connecting Railroad =

Overview
- Headquarters: Westland, Michigan, United States
- Reporting mark: DCON
- Locale: Detroit, Michigan, United States
- Dates of operation: December 1998–present

Technical
- Track gauge: 4 ft 8 1/2 in (1,435 mm) standard gauge

The Detroit Connecting Railroad Company (reporting mark DCON) is a Class III shortline railroad owned by the Adrian and Blissfield Rail Road Company. Its freight operations began in December 1998 with 2.25 miles (3.62 km) of track.

== Company information ==
- Parent: Adrian & Blissfield Rail Road Company
- President: Chris Bagwell
- Headquarters: 38235 North Executive Drive, Westland, Michigan 48185-1971, USA

== Trackage ==
- Location: Detroit, Michigan, USA
- Mileage 2.25 miles (3.62 km)
- Connection with: Canadian National Shore Line and Mt. Clemens subdivisions

== Commodities transported ==
- Finished Metal Products
- Scrap Metal
- Vegetables
- Chemicals
