= Grand Rapids, Indiana and Mackinaw Railroad =

Overview
- Dates of operation: 1881–1884
- Successor: Grand Rapids and Indiana Railroad

Technical
- Track gauge: 1,435 mm (4 ft 8 1/2 in)
- Length: 34.11 miles (54.89 km)

The Grand Rapids, Indiana and Mackinaw Railroad was a railroad company in the United States. It was incorporated in 1881 to extend the main line of the Grand Rapids and Indiana Railroad north from Little Traverse Bay to the Straits of Mackinac. The line opened in 1882. The company was consolidated with the Grand Rapids and Indiana Railroad in 1884. The line passed through the Pennsylvania Railroad to Penn Central and was subsequently abandoned in 1992.

== History ==
The Grand Rapids, Indiana and Mackinaw Railroad was incorporated on February 18, 1881. The company's The Grand Rapids and Indiana Railroad established the company to extend its main line north from Little Traverse Bay to Mackinaw City, Michigan, on the Straits of Mackinac. Construction began in 1881 from Bay View, also the starting point of the Bay View, Little Traverse and Mackinaw Railroad. The line, 34.11 miles (54.89 km) in length, opened on July 3, 1882. The company was consolidated with the Grand Rapids and Indiana Railroad on October 1, 1884.

The main line of the Grand Rapids and Indiana ran between Fort Wayne, Indiana, and Mackinaw City, a total distance of roughly 366 miles (589 km). Under the Pennsylvania Railroad and Penn Central the line was known as the Grand Rapids branch and GR&I branch. The line north of Petoskey, Michigan, including the entirety of the former Grand Rapids, Indiana and Mackinaw, remained with the bankrupt Penn Central estate and was not conveyed to Conrail in 1976. The shortline Michigan Northern Railway operated the line under contract between 1976 and 1988. The line north of Petoskey was abandoned in 1992.
