= Ludington and Northern Railway =

Defunct railroad which operated in Mason County, Michigan from 1902-1982

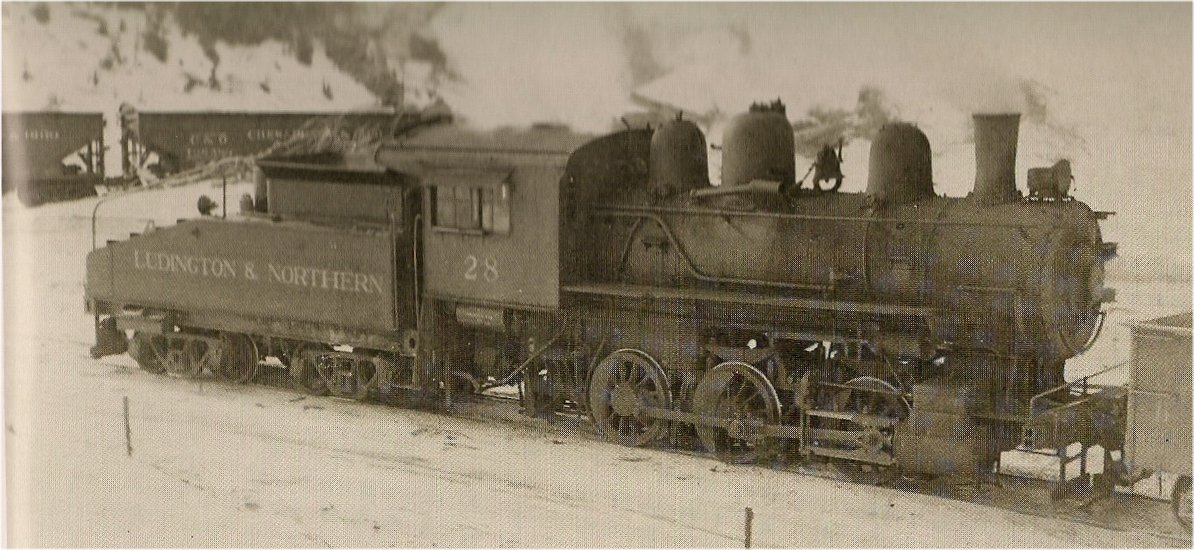

Overview
- Headquarters: Ludington, Michigan
- Locale: Mason County, Michigan
- Dates of operation: 1901–1982

Technical
- Track gauge: 4 ft 8 1/2 in (1,435 mm) standard gauge
- Length: 2.79 miles (4.49 km)

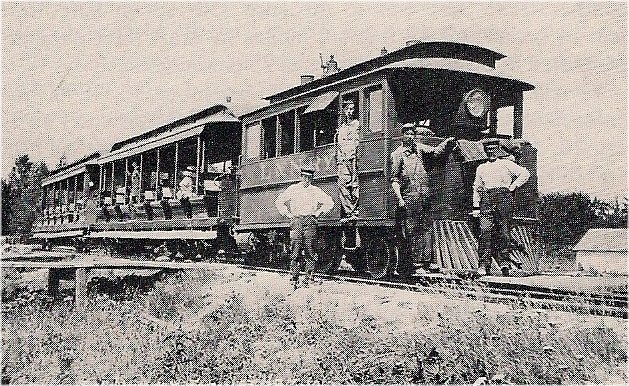
Epworth League Railway, ca 1895

The Ludington and Northern Railway, also known as the Dummy Train, or the L&N, is a defunct railroad which operated in Mason County, Michigan between 1902 and 1982. At a length of 2.79 miles (4.49 km), it was for decades the shortest operating common carrier railroad in the state.

On March 12, 1895, the Epworth League Railway in Mason County was organized. The original line completed in 1896 was 2 miles (3.2 km) long, running from Ludington to Epworth Heights, a Methodist Church summer colony. On July 18, 1901, the name was changed to Ludington and Northern Railway when Justus Smith Stearns purchased it.

The Sargent Sand company began mining operations just north of Ludington and south of the Ludington State Park in 1936, selling sand to foundries and other businesses. When Sargent Sand purchased the Ludington & Northern Railway Company, the rails ran from Ludington to Epworth Heights, and continued to the southernmost boundary of the Ludington State Park. The Sargent Sand company shortened the route, terminating it at their 79.6-acre (32.2 ha) mining operation, at which point the railroad reached its final length of 2.79 miles (4.49 km). When Sargent Sand ceased mining operations, the railway fell into disuse. The L&N officially became an abandoned line on June 15, 1982.

== See also ==
- Mason and Oceana Railroad
