= Mineral Range Railroad =

Overview
- Headquarters: Ishpeming, Michigan
- Reporting mark: MRA
- Locale: Upper Peninsula of Michigan
- Dates of operation: 2002–

Technical
- Track gauge: 4 ft 8 1/2 in (1,435 mm) standard gauge
- Length: 17 miles

Other
- Website: http://www.mineralrange.us

The Mineral Range Railroad (reporting mark MRA) is a shortline railroad in the Upper Peninsula of Michigan. It began operations in 2002 over a three mile long industrial track from Ishpeming to National Mine to serve an explosives plant. The railroad expanded in 2012 to include 12 miles of former Lake Superior and Ishpeming rail lines operated by Canadian National between Ishpeming and Humboldt to serve the Eagle Mine concentrating plant.

The Humboldt Mill was reopened in 2014 and is operated by Eagle Mine, owned by Lundin Mining. It was originally opened in 1954 by Cleveland-Cliffs Inc, who operated it until 1979. Between 1985 and 1990, Callahan Mining Company used it to process gold from the Ropes Gold Mine in Ishpeming, Michigan. After several changes in ownership, Eagle Mine started to use it for nickel and copper extraction in 2014.

Traffic on the Mineral Range Railroad primarily consists of nickel and copper ore concentrates.
