= Hamilton Northwestern Railroad =

Railroad in Michigan

Overview
- Headquarters: Saugatuck, Michigan
- Reporting mark: HNW
- Locale: Hamilton, Michigan
- Dates of operation: 2022–present

Technical
- Track gauge: 4 ft 8 1/2 in (1,435 mm) standard gauge
- Length: 6.1 miles

The Hamilton Northwestern Railroad (reporting mark HNW) is a shortline railroad in West Michigan. It began operations in 2022 after purchasing the railroad from Endeavour Ag and Energy. That company's predecessor had purchased the recently abandoned railroad from CSX Transportation in 2003 to preserve rail service at their Hamilton location.

Traffic on the Hamilton Northwestern Railroad consists of animal feed products.

The railroad is owned by the railroad holding company, Hamilton Hartford Group, LLC.

== History ==
The line currently operated by the Hamilton Northwestern Railroad was completed in 1870 by the Michigan Lake Shore Railroad as part of their plan to build a railroad from Allegan to Muskegon. By 1872, the Michigan Lake Shore had entered receivership and was reorganized as the "Grand Haven Railroad" in 1878. Shortly after, in 1881, the Grand Haven was consolidated with three other railroads to form the Chicago and West Michigan Railway. The C&WM continued to operate the line for about 20 years before it was consolidated into the Pere Marquette Railway in 1899. The Pere Marquette held the line until it was merged with the Chesapeake and Ohio Railway in 1947. The C&O abandoned the line south of Hamilton, towards Allegan, in 1973. In 1986, the line became part of the CSX system when that company purchased the C&O.

Traffic on the line dwindled under CSX and eventually only one active customer, Hamilton Farm Bureau (now Endeavour Ag and Energy), was left on the line. The line did not make financial sense for CSX to continue to operate, causing the company to file an abandonment petition with the Surface Transportation Board in 2003. Hamilton Farm Bureau stepped in to the purchase the line in order to preserve rail service to their facility. While under the ownership of Hamilton Farm Bureau and its successor entities, CSX was responsible for servicing the now private industry track.

Citing maintenance difficulties resulting in service suspensions and infrequent service from CSX in general, Endeavour Ag and Energy sold the 6.1 mile railroad to Hamilton Hartford Group in May 2022. Common carrier service was returned to the line under the name "Hamilton Northwestern Railroad".

== Locomotives ==
Number	Type	Build Date	Status	Notes
1397	EMD MP15AC	3/1980	back in service as of 9/10/26	Ex-Union Pacific Railroad. Exx-Soo Line Exxx-Chicago, Milwaukee, St. Paul and Pacific Railroad.
1416	EMD MP15AC	1976	In service	Ex-Union Pacific Railroad. Exx-Soo Line Exxx-Chicago, Milwaukee, St. Paul and Pacific Railroad.
