= Sault Ste. Marie Bridge Company =

Sault Ste. Marie International Railroad Bridge
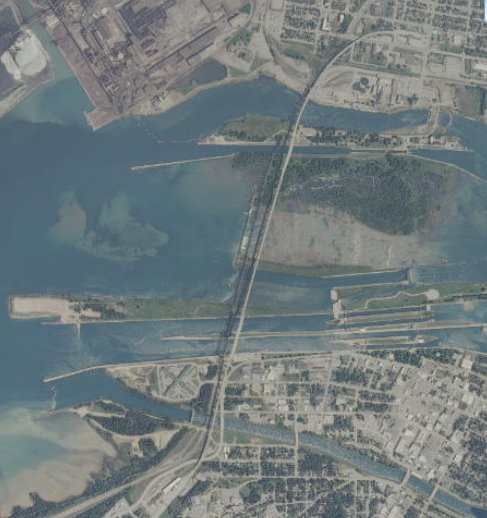
- The Railroad Bridge runs parallel to the highway bridge, and is the bridge on the left in the image.
- Coordinates: 46°30′27″N 84°21′43″W
- Carries: single set of railroad tracks
- Crosses: St. Marys River
- Owner: Canadian National Railway

Characteristics
- No. of spans: 9 camelback spans, plate girder overpass, double leaf bascule bridge, and vertical lift bridge, swing bridge

History
- Constructed by: Dominion Bridge Company
- Construction start: 1887

Sault Ste. Marie Bridge Company is a subsidiary of the Wisconsin Central Ltd. It operates a railroad bridge over the St. Marys River between Sault Ste. Marie, Michigan and Sault Ste. Marie, Ontario.

== See also ==
- Buffalo and Fort Erie Public Bridge Authority - public, Peace Bridge
- Detroit International Bridge Company - private, Ambassador Bridge
- Niagara Falls Bridge Commission - public, Lewiston-Queenston Bridge, Whirlpool Rapids Bridge and Rainbow Bridge
- Thousand Islands Bridge Authority - public, Thousand Islands Bridge
- Windsor-Detroit Bridge Authority - public, Gordie Howe International Bridge
