= Grand Rapids, Lansing and Detroit Railroad =

Overview
- Locale: Michigan
- Dates of operation: 1887–1897
- Successor: Pere Marquette Railway

Technical
- Track gauge: 4 ft 8 1/2 in (1,435 mm) standard gauge

The Grand Rapids, Lansing and Detroit Railroad is a defunct, nineteenth century railroad, formerly operating in Michigan. Incorporated May 17, 1887, it built a 53-mile line from Grand Rapids, Michigan to Grand Ledge, as well as the Ramona Branch, both of which it leased to the Detroit, Lansing and Northern Railroad. The former still exists as part of the CSX line into Grand Rapids, Michigan.
