= Michigan United Railways =

Railway company in Michigan

Michigan United Railways (MUR) was an interurban which owned and leased numerous lines in the state of Michigan during the early twentieth century.

== Corporate history ==
The company incorporated in Kalamazoo on March 31, 1906, with the intention of owning a line from Kalamazoo connecting eastwards to Battle Creek, Jackson, Lansing and St. Johns. On May 1 of that year the MUR consolidated the Lansing & Suburban Traction, Lansing City Electric, Michigan Traction Extension and Michigan Traction. The company also leased Jackson and Battle Creek Traction and the Lansing & Jackson. Taken together, these moves gave the company two intercity lines; one running from Kalamazoo to Jackson and other from Lansing to St. Johns, and the local streetcar operations in Kalamazoo, Battle Creek and Lansing. In May 1907 it acquired control of Jackson Consolidated Traction as well, which gave it Jackson's streetcar operations and several suburban lines.

On January 22, 1910, the MUR created the Lansing & Northeastern to construct a line east from Lansing to Owosso; it leased this line beginning in 1912. In 1911 the MUR bought the Owosso & Corunna Electric, which operated lines in and around Owosso. Between 1911 and 1916 the MUR leased the Kalamazoo, Lake Shore and Chicago, an unelectrified interurban which connected the Lake Michigan port of South Haven. On April 1, 1912, the MUR leased all its lines to Michigan United Traction, and arrangement which lasted until January 1, 1916, when all lines were re-leased to the Michigan Railway. That company dissolved in 1921 and the MUR again held its lines directly. In 1923 the MUR transferred all its owned lines, and some of its leases, to the Michigan Electric. The Michigan United Railways Company dissolved in 1924.

== Operations ==
During its lifetime the Michigan United operated a number of different lines, most of which it acquired through the acquisition of other companies rather than new construction.

=== Southern Division ===
In its initial round of consolidations and leases the Michigan United had acquired the Michigan Traction Company and the Jackson & Battle Creek Traction Company. Between 1901 and 1903 these two companies had built a 68.58 miles (110.37 km) line between Kalamazoo and Jackson (via Battle Creek). The line was almost entirely new construction, except for in Jackson, Battle Creek and Kalamazoo, where it shared track with local streetcar operations. There was additional street-running in Parma, Albion, Marshall, Augusta and Galesburg. There were two branch lines as well: one which split at Gull Lake Junction and ran north to Yorkville, providing service to the Gull Lake community, and one which ran north from Jackson to Grass Lake. The Gull Lake branch had been built by Michigan Traction in 1901, and was abandoned under Michigan United Traction in 1916. The Grass Lake branch was built by Jackson & Suburban Traction in 1901; by 1929 Michigan Electric had abandoned all of it save a short segment out to Michigan Center, which it sold to Jackson Transportation. Michigan Electric abandoned the main line in its entirety on November 11, 1928.

Through an arrangement with the Detroit United Railway (DUR) Michigan United cars ran east from Jackson into Detroit, allowing through car service between Kalamazoo and Detroit.

=== Northern Division ===
The main line of the Northern Division, which ran from Jackson to Lansing, was constructed in 1909, and was a rare instance of the Michigan United building a line itself rather than acquiring an existing company. The line was 37.34 miles (60.09 km) in length, and connected the Southern Division with the Lansing–St. Johns line. As was customary it ran over local streetcar lines in both Lansing and Jackson, but there was additional street-running in Leslie as well. The Lansing–St. Johns line was constructed in 1902 by the Lansing, St. Johns & St. Louis. It ran over streetcar lines in Lansing before turning north and running through DeWitt to St. Johns, for a total length of 19.61 miles (31.56 km). Another branch line ran to Owosso; this was built in 1910 by the Lansing & Northeastern, a wholly owned subsidiary of Michigan United. The line ran northeast along the Grand Trunk Western's Chicago–Port Huron line before turning north at Morrice and entering Owosso, for a total length of 33.2 miles (53.4 km). Michigan Electric abandoned all three lines in May 1929.

=== Northeastern Division ===
The Northeastern Division operated several lines and branches in the Tri-Cities and Flint. The main line, which ran from Bay City to Flint, was built in stages between 1904 and 1914. The initial segment, Saginaw to Bridgeport, was built in 1904 by the Detroit, Flint & Saginaw. The same year the company built a branch line to Frankenmuth ("little Bavaria"). In 1908 the Saginaw & Flint, successor to the DF&S, branched off west of Frankenmuth and completed the line to Flint. Finally, in 1911, the S&F built north from Saginaw to Bay City, finishing the main line for a total length of 47.09 miles (75.78 km). Ownership passed to Michigan Railroad in 1919, and that company abandoned the Frankenmuth branch in 1922 and the main line in 1929. The Michigan United owned a separate Saginaw–Bay City line which had come down to it from the Saginaw–Bay City. This 13.44-mile (21.63 km) line ran along the left bank of the Saginaw River through Zilwaukee. Michigan Railroad sold the Saginaw–Zilwaukee section to Saginaw Transit in 1922 and then abandoned the rest.

=== Western Division ===
The main line of the Western Division was the last major addition to Michigan United's network: a newly built 49.72-mile (80.02 km) line running north from Kalamazoo to Grand Rapids. This line opened in 1915 and was abandoned in 1929. At Monteith Junction the main crossed the "Battle Creek branch," a 31.74-mile (51.08 km) line connecting southeast to Battle Creek originally built by the Michigan & Ohio. This line had been taken over by the Michigan & Chicago, another interurban, and electrified. The Michigan Railway took over operations in 1914; its successor, Michigan Railroad, abandoned all but a small stretch in 1928. The remainder, Battle Creek–Hooper, was sold to the Michigan Central in 1930. Another branch owned by the Michigan & Chicago, which continued from Monteith Junction west to Allegan, was also abandoned in 1928.

=== Other ===
In 1911 the Michigan United leased the Kalamazoo, Lake Shore and Chicago, a Kalamazoo–South Haven line. Although intended as another interurban, its owners lacked the capital for electrification. The MUR hoped to use the line to tap into the lucrative Lake Michigan traffic, but this never happened and the MUR allowed the lease to lapse in 1916.

Between 1916 and 1924 the Michigan United (through the Michigan Railway) leased the Grand Rapids, Holland & Chicago, which connected Grand Rapids with the Lake Michigan communities of Holland and Saugatuck.

== Equipment ==
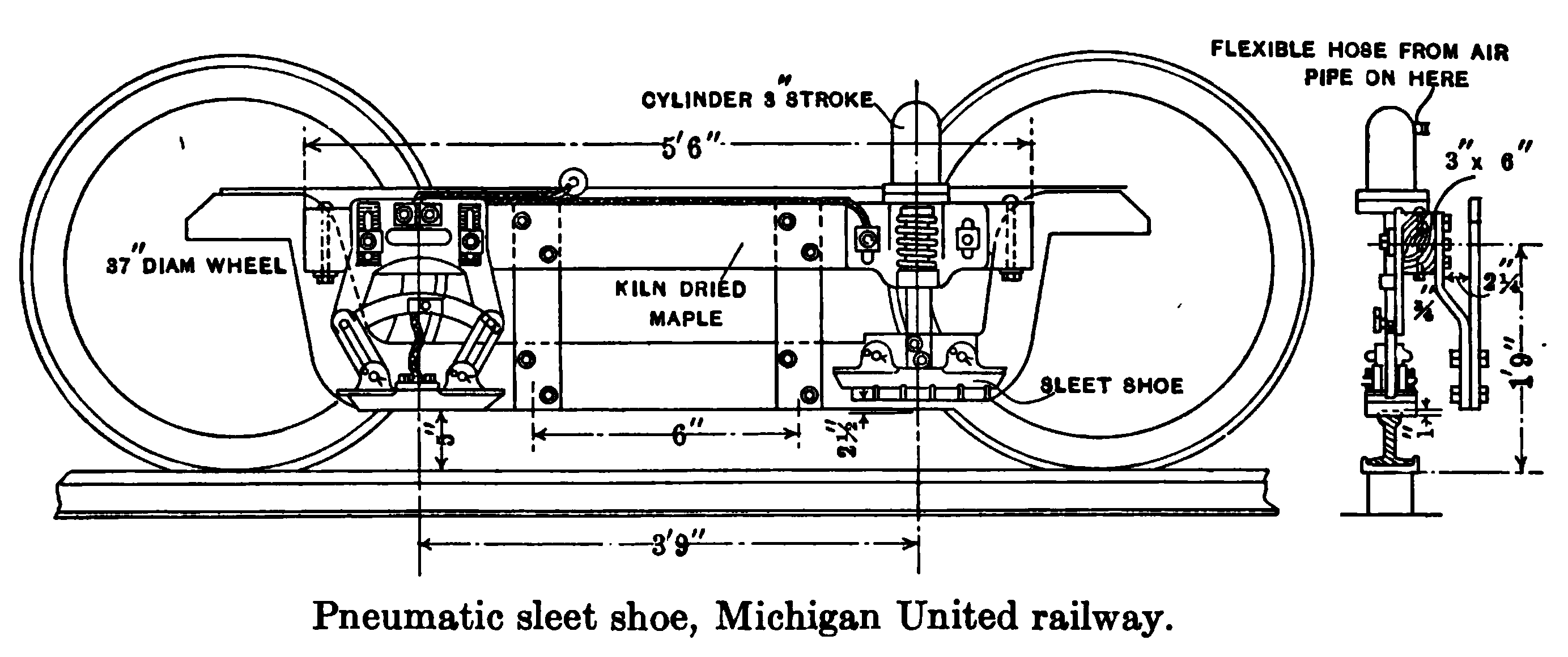
A technical drawing of a pneumatic sleet shoe.

Much of the Michigan United's network used an electrified third rail to power the locomotives. Cars carried a "shoe" which rode on top of the third rail. This proved a problem during Michigan's notoriously harsh winters, when ice build-up on the tracks inhibited conductivity. To meet this challenge W. Silvius, the Michigan United equipment superintendent in Albion, developed a "pneumatic sleet shoe." The design was similar to a standard shoe, but included four steel cutters on the front to cut the sleet, while a system of air hoses allowed the motorman to lower as needed.
