= Detroit, Lake Shore and Mt. Clemens Railway =

Interurban railway in Michigan

The Detroit, Lake Shore and Mt. Clemens Railway, also known as the Shore Line Interurban, is a defunct interurban which operated in the Detroit area in the late 1890s. The company incorporated on July 3, 1896 to construct a 23-mile (37 km) line from Detroit through 'the Points' and out to Mt. Clemens. This line opened on September 28, 1898. On March 24, 1900, the company was bought by the Detroit and Lake St. Clair Railway. After 31 years of service to Detroit's east side, service ended in 1927 on the 28 mile line.
