= Lansing, St. Johns and St. Louis Railway =

Electric interurban railway in Michigan

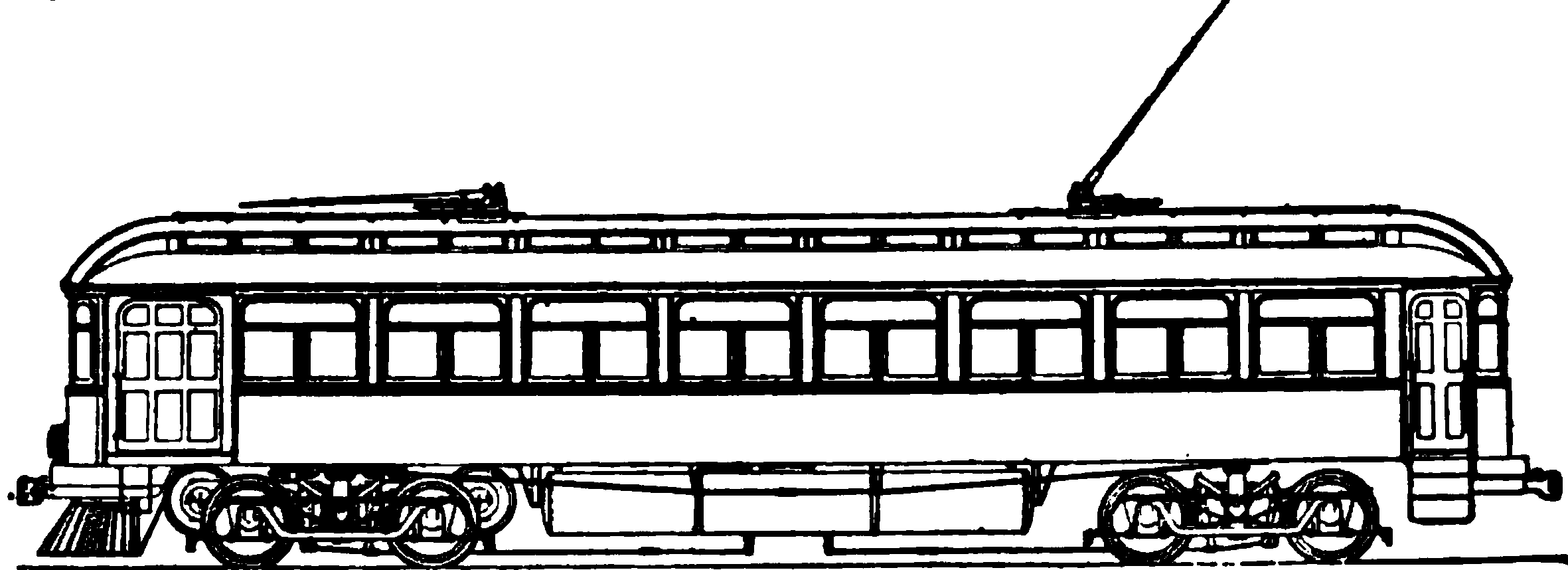
A sketch of a car supplied by the Jewett Car Company and fitted with a trolley pole to connect with the overhead lines.

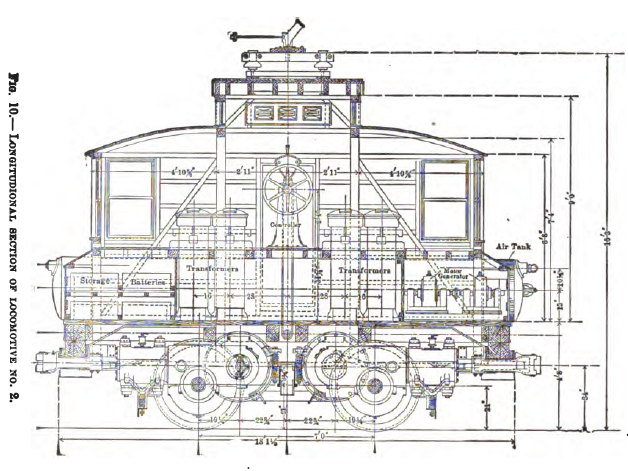
A technical drawing of Arnold's second locomotive, which was lost in the fire of December 1903.

The Lansing, St. Johns and St. Louis Railway was an electric interurban railway which briefly operated independently in central Michigan during the early 20th century. It was the site of a failed attempt to introduce alternating current to the interurban scene.

The company incorporated on April 10, 1900, with the intention of constructing a new line north from Lansing through St. Johns and Maple Rapids to St. Louis (today the route of U.S. Highway 127). During its inception the company had come to the attention of Bion J. Arnold, an American engineer well known for his innovations in electrical engineering, who would later build New York City's Interborough Rapid Transit subway system. Arnold sought an opportunity to test his idea for using single-phase alternating current instead of direct current for locomotive power. His company received the contract for the road's construction and work commenced in mid-1900.

On February 3, 1902, the company completed a 18.5-mile (29.8 km) line as far as St. Johns. On entering Lansing trains joined the Cedar Street line of the local streetcar system. The electrical systems were not yet ready, so the railroad was operated by steam locomotives supplied by the Michigan Suburban Railroad. Arnold's account states that steam service began on November 15, 1901; Meints puts the completion of the line in February 1902. Construction of the overhead lines was finished by December 1902, and tests began the following March. The first trial trips occurred on June 15, 1903, using a specially-built experimental locomotive. The company had ordered three interurban cars from the Jewett Car Company of Jewett, Ohio. These were of wooden construction, 56 feet 5 inches (17.20 m) in length, capable of seating 50 passengers, but at that stage Arnold's experimental motor lacked the motive power to drive them. A new locomotive fitted with two motors was readied for tests in early December, but a fire swept through the company's car house, destroying the locomotive, two of the Jewett cars, and a steam locomotive. While engineers constructed a new locomotive, "Phoenix," the company rebuilt the line to permit DC operation, thereby allowing Lansing streetcars to operate over it. On August 3, 1904, the new locomotive made a trial run of 8 miles (13 km) out to DeWitt. A blown circuit breaker ended the test prematurely.

On March 26, 1904, the Lansing and Suburban Traction, which already owned the streetcar lines in Lansing, bought the Lansing, St. Johns & St. Louis, prompting the need to permit DC operation over the line. In the end, Arnold's experiments notwithstanding, the Lansing & Suburban operated the line using standard 600-volt direct current instead of 6000-volt alternating current. The line would change hands several times before finally ending up in the hands of the Michigan Electric, which abandoned it on May 16, 1929.
