= Lapeer Industrial Railroad =

Overview
- Headquarters: Lapeer, Michigan
- Reporting mark: LIRR, LIRX
- Locale: Lapeer, Michigan
- Dates of operation: 1999–present
- Predecessor: Michigan Central Railroad

Technical
- Track gauge: 4 ft 8 1/2 in (1,435 mm) standard gauge
- Length: 1.34 miles plus leased track

Other
- Website: https://abrailroad.com/railroads/lirr/

The Lapeer Industrial Railroad (reporting mark LIRR) is a short switching operation in Lapeer, Michigan, which owns and operates 1.34 miles (2.16 km) of track that was formerly part of a line of the Michigan Central Railroad. A subsidiary of the Adrian and Blissfield Rail Road Company, the railroad interchanges with Canadian National Railway (CN) along a leased 0.88 miles (1.42 km) of side track in Lapeer. Operations along the line are carried out by a GE 65-ton switcher that was built in 1950.

Currently, its only customer is the Delta Faucet Company (formerly known as American Bath and Shower), a subsidiary of Masco Corp. Its past customers included Lapeer Grain (which went bankrupt in 2014) and Lapeer Industries (which also went bankrupt in 2020).

In March 2017, the railroad sued the city of Lapeer for $1,271 for not paying a “mandated, annual railroad crossing maintenance fee” for 10 years. It alleged that the city had not paid the fee per the Railroad Code of 1993 and now owed the railroad $12,710. In August 2017, a settlement was reached with the city paying the railroad $5,000.
