= Detroit, Howell and Lansing Railroad =

The Detroit, Howell and Lansing Railroad is a defunct railroad which operated in central and southeast Michigan during the early 1870s. The company formed on March 29, 1870 through the consolidation of the Detroit and Howell and the Howell and Lansing. From the two companies the DH&L gained a partially graded right-of-way 84 miles (135 km) long, with track laid on perhaps half of it, stretching from Lansing southeast to Detroit.

On March 16, 1871 the company consolidated with the Ionia and Lansing to form the Detroit, Lansing & Lake Michigan. The company had existed as an independent entity for less than a year.
