= Charlotte Southern Railroad =

Short line railroad in Michigan, US

Charlotte Southern Rail Road
Overview
- Headquarters: Blissfield, Michigan
- Reporting mark: CHS
- Locale: Michigan
- Dates of operation: 1999–2023

Technical
- Track gauge: 4 ft 8 1/2 in (1,435 mm) standard gauge
- Length: 3.25 miles

Charlotte Southern Rail Road is a short line railroad operating in Michigan. It connects Charlotte, Michigan, with the CN rail system. It is a freight system, but its main customer has not received rail traffic since the early 2000s. It is operated by the Adrian and Blissfield Rail Road Company.

== Dinner Train ==
The railroad hosts the Old Road Dinner train.

== Equipment ==
The railroad uses a GE 44-ton switcher for the Old Road Dinner train and any freight operations. This locomotive was the last 44-ton locomotive ever built. The railroad uses three passenger cars for the dinner train, and has two more stored at the end of the line.
