= Michigan Lake Shore Railroad =

Railroad in Michigan

Overview
- Locale: Michigan, United States
- Dates of operation: 1869–1878
- Predecessor: Allegan and Holland Railroad, Muskegon and Ferrysburg Railroad
- Successor: Grand Haven Railroad (1878–1881), Chicago and West Michigan Railroad (1881)

Technical
- Length: 57.5 miles (92.5 km)

The Michigan Lake Shore Railroad (MLS) is a defunct railroad company which operated in the state of Michigan between 1869 and 1878 and was known as the Grand Haven Railroad until 1881.

The MLS was formed on October 13, 1869, by the consolidation of the Allegan and Holland Railroad and the Muskegon and Ferrysburg Railroad. The A&H was organized on July 29, 1868; the M&F on January 22, 1869. By July 1, 1870, a 57.5-mile (92.5 km) line which linked Allegan to Muskegon on the coast of Lake Michigan finished construction.

The company carried mostly lumber and had difficulty turning a profit; in 1872 it entered receivership. On October 1, 1878, it was reorganized as the Grand Haven Railroad, which operated the road for another three years until it was consolidated into the Chicago and West Michigan Railroad.
