= Jackson and Lansing Railroad =

Overview
- Headquarters: Westland, Michigan
- Reporting mark: JAIL
- Locale: Central Michigan
- Dates of operation: 2010–Present
- Predecessor: Norfolk Southern Railway

Technical
- Track gauge: 4 ft 8 1/2 in (1,435 mm) standard gauge
- Length: 47 miles

Other
- Website: www.abrailroad.com

The Jackson and Lansing Railroad (reporting marks JAIL) is a Class III common carrier in Central Michigan. The railroad runs for 47 miles, from Jackson, Michigan to Lansing, Michigan, on track leased from Norfolk Southern Railway for 20 years with an option to purchase the line when the lease expires. The railroad connects with Canadian National Railway, CSX Transportation in Lansing, and Norfolk Southern in Jackson. The Adrian and Blissfield Railroad holding company owns this railroad along with four other shortlines in Michigan.
