= Kalamazoo, Lake Shore and Chicago Railway =

Railway in Michigan

- KLS&C engine No. 37, circa 1910

Overview
- Headquarters: Kalamazoo, Michigan
- Locale: West Michigan
- Dates of operation: 1906–1916

Technical
- Track gauge: 4 ft 8 1/2 in (1,435 mm) standard gauge

The Kalamazoo, Lake Shore and Chicago Railway (aka The Fruit Belt Line) operated on track laid between Kalamazoo and South Haven, Michigan. Much of the track has been removed and is now known as the "Van Buren Trail".

The railway went through the following towns, starting from the east:

- Kalamazoo, Michigan
- Oshtemo, Michigan
- Brighton, Michigan
- Rix, Michigan
- Walker, Michigan
- Eassom, Michigan
- Mattawan, Michigan
- Newbre, Michigan
- Lawton, Michigan
- Paw Paw, Michigan
- Barrison, Michigan
- Lake Cora, Michigan
- Lawrence, Michigan
- Hartford, Michigan
- Toquin, Michigan
- Covert, Michigan
- Packard, Michigan
- Fruitland, Michigan
- Cableton, Michigan
- South Haven, Michigan
