= St. Joseph Valley Railroad (1848–1869) =

Railroad in Michigan

Map

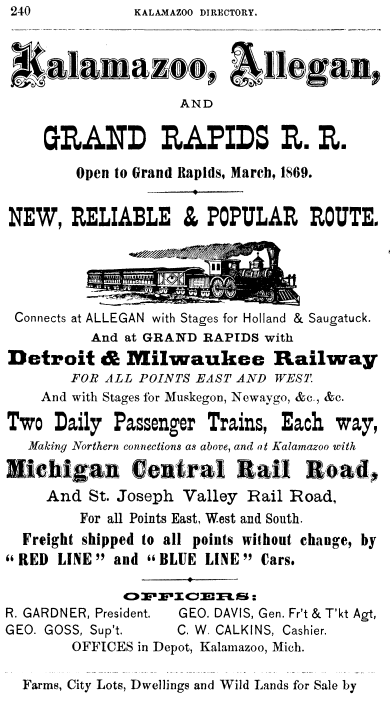
Advertisement for Kalamazoo, Allegan & Grand Rapids, with whom the St. Joseph Valley connected in Kalamazoo. By the end of 1869 both systems were leased by the Lake Shore & Michigan Southern.

The St. Joseph Valley Rail Road is a defunct railroad which operated in southern Michigan during the mid-19th century.

The company was chartered on April 3, 1848, following authorization by an act of the Michigan State Legislature; the bill called for a line from St. Joseph, on the coast of Lake Michigan in Berrien County east through Cassopolis (Cass County) into St. Joseph County. The act stipulated that the company had ten years from the passage of the act to complete its line, a distance of about 50 miles (80 km), or its "rights, privileges and powers [as a corporation] shall be null and void, so far as it regards such part of said rail road as shall not be finished within the periods limited by this act."

In 1855 the company completed a line along the St. Joseph River from Constantine to Three Rivers, a distance of 7.5 miles (12.1 km), well short of the act's target. The company had difficulty moving forward, but the legislature obligingly extended the deadline in 1861 and again in 1863. On November 21, 1864, the St. Joseph Valley leased the 3.9-mile (6.3 km) section of the Michigan Southern & Northern Indiana which connected White Pigeon to Constantine, giving the St. Joseph Valley an uninterrupted running length of some 11.4 miles (18.3 km) but still well short of Cassopolis, let alone Berrien County. In 1865 a new act by the Michigan State Legislature authorized the Schoolcraft & Three Rivers to purchase the St. Joseph Valley Railroad, but this did not take place until August 14, 1869, at which point the St. Joseph Valley ceased to exist as an independent company. In the meantime the St. Joseph Valley operated over the Schoolcraft & Three Rivers tracks into Kalamazoo, where it connected with numerous other lines.

The St. Joseph's original stretch from Constantine to Three Rivers is today operated by the Norfolk Southern.
