= Michigan and Ohio Railroad =

Defunct 19th century American railroad

Map

The Michigan and Ohio Railroad is a defunct railroad which operated in southern Michigan in the mid-1880s. Originally intended to forge a new line from Lake Erie to Lake Michigan, it came close to its goal, completing a line between Allegan and Dundee before financial embarrassment landed it in receivership.

== Corporate history ==
The company incorporated on June 25, 1883, to consolidate the Toledo & Michigan, an Ohio company, and the Toledo & Milwaukee. The company filed articles on October 9, 1883, and began operations November 29. Beset by financial difficulties, the company went into receivership almost immediately; the Cincinnati, Jackson & Mackinaw (CJ&MK) bought the company on March 25, 1887.

Discussing the liabilities assumed by the CJ&MK in acquiring the M&O and other companies, Michigan's railroad commissioner wrote that:

"...a sum so largely in excess of the real value of the property as to suggest unfavorable comment upon the policy of loading down a new enterprise with liabilities that cannot fail to seriously impair the financial standing of the corporation."

== Michigan operations ==
From the Toledo & Milwaukee the M&O inherited 11.5 miles (18.5 km) of track in revenue service between Allegan and Monteith, where the tracks crossed those of the Grand Rapids & Indiana, and a completed-but-not-operational stretch 121.7 miles (195.9 km) in length east from Monteith through Battle Creek and Marshall to Dundee, in Monroe County. The M&O promptly opened this new section opened on November 29, 1883. The Toledo & Milwaukee had also leased the tracks of the Toledo, Ann Arbor & Grand Trunk, which ran south from Dundee to Toledo, Ohio, the company no longer having the funds to complete its own line.

The M&O continued this leasing arrangement; in 1884, when the TAA&GT merged into the Toledo, Ann Arbor & North Michigan, the M&O continued to lease the Dundee–Toledo line from the new company, although the last two miles from Manhattan Junction to Toledo proper were leased from a new concern, the Wheeling and Lake Erie Railroad.
