= Detroit, Lansing and Lake Michigan Rail Road =

Railroad in Michigan

Detroit, Lansing & Lake Michigan Rail Road
Overview
- Headquarters: Detroit, MI and Boston, MA
- Dates of operation: 1871–1876
- Successor: Detroit, Lansing & Northern

Technical
- Track gauge: 4 ft 8 1/2 in (1,435 mm) standard gauge

The Detroit, Lansing and Lake Michigan Railroad (DL&LM) is a defunct railroad which built and operated the first rail line between Detroit and the state capital Lansing. Though the corporation was short-lived, much of the route it placed in service is still in use by CSX.

== History ==
=== Corporate ===
The DL&LM was formed April 11, 1871 by a merger of the Detroit, Howell and Lansing Railroad, the Ionia and Lansing Railroad, and the Ionia, Stanton and Northern Railroad. The DL&LM was sold under foreclosure on December 14, 1876 and reorganized under the name of Detroit, Lansing and Northern Railroad.

At the end of April, 1873, the railroad was mortgaged for over $6 million, though the DH&LM placed its own value at that time as just short of $4.2 million. But with a profit of more than $400,000 on revenues of $940,000, the firm's future must have seemed bright to president J. F. Joy, who had taken over from H.H. Smith at the end of 1872.

Notwithstanding the 1876 reorganization, the corporation was not legally dissolved until July 15, 1998.

=== Operational ===
At the time of the merger, all three railroads existed mostly on paper, but on June 30, 1871, DL&LM opened the segment between Detroit and Plymouth, with the segment from Plymouth to Brighton following on July 1. The Brighton-Williamston-Lansing segment became operational on August 31, 1871, completing the first rail link between Detroit and Lansing.

By the end of 1872, the DL&LM reported 189 miles of track, including a 164-mile mainline, all built with iron rail. All 156 grade crossings were uncontrolled. The longest bridge was a 1650-ft wooden truss and trestle at Ionia. System-wide speed limits were 21 mph for passenger trains, and 10 mph for freights. Total annual traffic miles for 1872 were 674,505, with just 23% due to passenger traffic.

After passing in short order through several other hands, the Detroit-Lansing route built by the DL&LM became part of the mainline of the Pere Marquette Railroad on January 1, 1900. Subsequent owners were the Chesapeake and Ohio Railway and the Chessie System. It is currently owned by CSX and operated as the Plymouth Subdivision of the CSX Chicago Division.
