= Chicago and Michigan Lake Shore Railroad =

Railroad in Michigan

The Chicago and Michigan Lake Shore Railroad (C&MLS) is a defunct railroad which operated in Michigan between 1869 and 1878, and as the Chicago and West Michigan Railroad until 1881.

The C&MLS was chartered in 1869 and commenced construction of a 27-mile (43 km) line between New Buffalo and St. Joseph, which opened on February 1, 1870. The line was extended to Grand Junction on February 28, 1871, Montague on July 1, 1871, and Pentwater on January 1, 1872, for a running length of 169.8 miles (273.3 km). The New Buffalo–Holland and Muskegon–Pentwater sections were owned directly by the C&MLS, and it had running rights from the Michigan Lake Shore Railroad (MLS) over the Holland–Muskegon section. The portion north of Muskegon was built by the Montague, Pentwater and Manistee Railroad.

At the same time, the C&MLS was constructing two branch lines: Holland–Grand Rapids (built by the Grand Rapids and Holland Railroad), which opened on January 1, 1872, and Muskegon–Big Rapids (built by the Muskegon and Big Rapids Railroad), which opened on July 21, 1873.

Faced with falling revenues and a large debt load the C&MLS went into receivership toward the end of 1876, and remained in that state until reorganized as the Chicago and West Michigan Railroad on December 28, 1878. The C&WM continued to operate the network until it was consolidated with other companies into the Chicago and West Michigan Railway on September 1, 1881.
