= Adrian and Blissfield Rail Road =

U.S. short line railroad in Michigan

Overview
- Headquarters: Westland, Michigan
- Reporting mark: ADBF
- Locale: Lenawee County, Michigan
- Dates of operation: 1991–present

Technical
- Track gauge: 4 ft 8 1/2 in (1,435 mm) standard gauge
- Length: 20 miles

Other
- Website: abrailroad.com

The Adrian and Blissfield Rail Road Company (reporting mark ADBF) is a Class III short line railroad which operates 20 miles (32 km) of railroad track between Adrian and Riga, in Lenawee County, Michigan. It was incorporated February 6, 1991, with company headquarters in Westland, Michigan. It also operates Lapeer Industrial Railroad, Charlotte Southern Railroad, Detroit Connecting Railroad, and Jackson and Lansing Railroad.

ADBF's railroad line is one of the oldest operating in the United States, having been originally built in 1834 by the Erie and Kalamazoo Railroad.

ADBF also operates a dinner train known as "The Old Road Dinner Train" in Blissfield, and a sister company operates in Charlotte.

== Fleet ==
The ADBF fleet, as of April 2025, consists of the following 10 locomotives:

Number	Type	Built
41	GE 44 Ton	1956
1755, 1760	EMD GP9	1955-1957
821	EMD SD40-2	1966
822-826, 828	EMD GP40-2	1966-1972
