= Mid-Michigan Railroad =

Privately owned railroad in Michigan

Overview
- Parent company: Genesee and Wyoming
- Headquarters: Muskegon, Michigan
- Reporting mark: MMRR
- Locale: Michigan
- Dates of operation: 1987–
- Predecessor: CSX Transportation

Technical
- Track gauge: 4 ft 8 1/2 in (1,435 mm) standard gauge
- Length: 30 mi (48 km)

Other
- Website: Official website

The Mid-Michigan Railroad (reporting mark MMRR) is a railroad owned by Genesee & Wyoming. It operates 30 miles (48 km) of track in Michigan.

== History ==
The company incorporated in 1987, for the purpose of acquiring railway lines from the CSX Corporation. The company was owned at inception by RailTex, a Texas-based holding company which owned many short line railroads. The Mid-Michigan bought two lines from CSX:Elmdale–Greenville and Paines–Elwell. In 1999 it sold the southernmost 5.6 miles (9.0 km) of Elmdale line, Elmdale–Malta, back to CSX.

== Routes ==
=== St. Louis Subdivision: Alma - Paines ===
The only remaining line on the Mid-Michigan is the line from Alma to Paines. The line from Lowell to Greenville was sold back to Grand Rapids Eastern Railroad and soon after removed for a bike trail in 2009. Corn and soybeans are the main commodities hauled. The railroad interchanges with the Great Lakes Central Railroad at Alma and Lake State Railway at Paines.

== Traffic ==
The railroad's traffic comes mainly from grain products, such as corn and soybeans. The MMRR hauled around 5,100 carloads in 2008.
