= List of rail trails in Michigan =

This list of rail trails in Michigan lists former railroad rights-of-way in Michigan that have been converted to rail trails for public use. A rail trail may still include rails, such as light rail or streetcar. By virtue of their characteristic shape (long and flat), some shorter rail trails are known as greenways and linear parks. As of 2015, Michigan has the most total mileage (2,381) of any state.

== Upper Peninsula ==
| Trail name | Length (mi) | Length (km) | Counties | Original railroad | References |
|---|---|---|---|---|---|
| Apple Blossom Trail | 3 | 4.8 | Iron | Chicago and North Western Railroad | |
| Beaver Pete's Trail | 20 | 32 | Dickinson | Chicago and North Western Railroad | |
| Beechwood to Gibbs City Trail | 48 | 77 | Iron | Chicago and North Western Railroad | |
| Bergland to Sidnaw Rail Trail | 43.5 | 70.0 | Houghton, Ontonagon | Duluth, South Shore and Atlantic Railway | |
| Bill Nicholls Trail | 41.5 | 66.8 | Houghton, Ontonagon | Copper Range Railroad | |
| Coalwood Trail | 26.4 | 42.5 | Alger, Schoolcraft | Lake Superior and Ishpeming Railroad | |
| Crystal Falls to Stager Trail | 25 | 40 | Iron | Chicago and North Western Railroad | |
| Escanaba to Hermansville Rail-Trail | 25.5 | 41.0 | Delta, Menominee | Soo Line Railroad | |
| Felch Grade Trail | 38 | 61 | Dickinson, Delta, Menominee | Chicago and North Western Railroad | |
| Freda Grade Trail | 8.4 | 13.5 | Houghton | Copper Range Railroad | |
| Gay-Mohawk Trail | 27.4 | 44.1 | Keweenaw | Copper Range Railroad | |
| Grand Marais Trail | 41.7 | 67.1 | Alger | Lake Superior and Ishpeming Railroad | |
| Hancock-Calumet Rail Trail | 13.4 | 21.6 | Houghton | Mineral Range Railroad | |
| Haywire Grade Trail | 33 | 53 | Alger, Schoolcraft | Manistique and Lake Superior Railroad | |
| Houghton-to-Chassell Rail-Trail | 8.6 | 13.8 | Houghton | Duluth, South Shore and Atlantic Railway | |
| Iron Ore Heritage Trail | 47 | 76 | Marquette | Duluth, South Shore and Atlantic Railway | |
| Keweenaw Trails | 58 | 93 | Houghton, Keweenaw | Copper Range Railroad | |
| Little Falls Trail | 6.5 | 10.5 | Ontonagon | Chicago and North Western Railroad | |
| Ontonagon to Rockland Trail | 13.0 | 20.9 | Ontonagon | Ontonagon & Brule River Railway | |
| Peshekee to Clowry Rail-Trail | 6.1 | 9.8 | Marquette | Chicago and North Western Railroad | |
| Republic/Champion Grade Trail | 7.5 | 12.1 | Marquette | Escanaba and Lake Superior Railroad | |
| St. Ignace–Trout Lake Trail | 26 | 42 | Chippewa, Mackinac | Detroit, Mackinac and Marquette Railroad | |
| Soo Strong Trail | 32 | 51 | Chippewa | Soo Line Railroad | |
| State Line Trail | 107.1 | 172.4 | Gogebic, Iron | Chicago and North Western Railroad | |
| Watersmeet to Land O'Lakes Trail | 8.8 | 14.2 | Gogebic | Chicago and North Western Railroad | |
| Western Gateway Trail | 6 | 9.7 | Gogebic | Chicago and North Western Railroad | |

== Northern Michigan ==
| Trail name | Length (mi) | Length (km) | Counties | Original railroad | References |
|---|---|---|---|---|---|
| Alpena to Hillman Trail | 17.8 | 28.6 | Alpena | Boyne City Railroad | |
| Betsie Valley Trail | 22 | 35 | Benzie | Ann Arbor Railroad | |
| Boardman Lake Trail | 3 | 4.8 | Grand Traverse | Pere Marquette Railway | |
| Grass River Natural Area Rail-Trail | 2.2 | 3.5 | Antrim | Chicago and West Michigan Railway | |
| Huron Sunrise Trail | 11 | 18 | Presque Isle | Detroit and Mackinac Railway | |
| Leelanau Trail | 16.6 | 26.7 | Grand Traverse, Leelanau | Manistee and North-Eastern Railroad | |
| Little Traverse Wheelway | 26.7 | 43.0 | Charlevoix, Emmet | Chicago and West Michigan Railway | |
| North Central State Trail | 62 | 100 | Cheboygan, Otsego | Lake State Railway | |
| North Eastern State Trail | 71 | 114 | Alpena, Cheboygan, Presque Isle | Alpena and Northern Railroad | |
| North Western State Trail | 32 | 51 | Cheboygan, Emmet | Grand Rapids and Indiana Railroad | |
| TART Trail | 10.5 | 16.9 | Grand Traverse | Chicago and West Michigan Railway, Manistee and North-Eastern Railroad | |
| White Pine Trail State Park | 92 | 148 | Kent, Mecosta, Montcalm, Osceola, Wexford | Grand Rapids and Indiana Railroad | |

== West Michigan ==
| Trail name | Length (mi) | Length (km) | Counties | Original railroad | References |
|---|---|---|---|---|---|
| Fred Meijer Berry Junction Trail | 11.1 | 17.9 | Muskegon | Chicago and West Michigan Railroad | |
| Fred Meijer Grand River Valley Rail Trail | 15.5 | 24.9 | Kent, Ionia | Grand Trunk Western Railroad | |
| Fred Meijer Pioneer Trail | 5.4 | 8.7 | Kent | Coopersville and Marne Railway | |
| Grand River Edges Trail | 5.4 | 8.7 | Kent | Pere Marquette Railway | |
| Hart–Montague Trail State Park | 22 | 35 | Muskegon, Oceana | Chesapeake and Ohio Railway | |
| Interurban Trail (Allegan County) | 1.3 | 2.1 | Allegan | Grand Rapids and Indiana Railroad | |
| Interurban Trail (Kent County) | 2 | 3.2 | Kent | Grand Rapids and Indiana Railroad | |
| Kent Trails | 15 | 24 | Kent | New York Central Railroad | |
| Laketon Trail | 3.3 | 5.3 | Muskegon | Grand Rapids, Grand Haven and Muskegon Railway | |
| Medbery Bike Trail | 1.5 | 2.4 | Muskegon | Chesapeake and Ohio Railway | |
| Muskegon Lakeshore Trail | 11.2 | 18.0 | Muskegon | Chesapeake and Ohio Railway | |
| Musketawa Trail | 25 | 40 | Muskegon, Ottawa | Muskegon, Grand Rapids and Indiana Railroad | |
| North Bank Trail | 3.3 | 5.3 | Ottawa | Detroit, Grand Haven and Milwaukee Railway | |
| White Lake Pathway | 3.2 | 5.1 | Muskegon | Chesapeake and Ohio Railway | |

== Central Michigan and the Thumb ==
| Trail name | Length (mi) | Length (km) | Counties | Original railroad | References |
|---|---|---|---|---|---|
| Bay County Riverwalk/Railtrail System | 17.8 | 28.6 | Bay | Detroit, Bay City and Alpena Railroad | |
| Bay-Zil Trail | 5.7 | 9.2 | Bay, Saginaw | Michigan Central Railroad | |
| Cass City Walking Trail | 1.4 | 2.3 | Tuscola | Pontiac, Oxford & Northern Railroad | |
| Fred Meijer Clinton-Ionia-Shiawassee Trail | 41.4 | 66.6 | Clinton, Ionia, Shiawassee | Grand Trunk Western Railroad | |
| Fred Meijer Flat River Valley Rail Trail | 21.7 | 34.9 | Ionia, Kent, Montcalm | Grand Rapids, Belding and Saginaw Railroad | |
| Fred Meijer Heartland Trail | 42 | 68 | Gratiot, Montcalm | Pere Marquette Railway | |
| Fred Thwaites Grand River Trail | 3.2 | 5.1 | Ionia | Grand Trunk Western Railroad | |
| Genesee Valley Trail | 4.5 | 7.2 | Genesee | Grand Trunk Western Railroad | |
| George Atkin Jr. Recreational Trail | 4.2 | 6.8 | Genesee | Pere Marquette Railway | |
| Harger Line Rail-Trail | 10.1 | 16.3 | Saginaw, Tuscola | Michigan Central Railroad | |
| Harbor Beach Bike-Pedestrian Path | 1 | 1.6 | Huron | Pere Marquette Railway | |
| Linear Park Pathway | 2.3 | 3.7 | Lapeer | Michigan Central Railroad | |
| Pere Marquette Rail Trail | 30 | 48 | Clare, Isabella, Midland | Flint and Pere Marquette Railroad | |
| Portland Riverwalk | 9 | 14 | Ionia | Ionia and Lansing Railroad | |
| Saginaw Valley Rail Trail | 11 | 18 | Saginaw | Jackson, Lansing and Saginaw Railroad | |
| Southern Links Trailway | 10.2 | 16.4 | Genesee, Lapeer, Tuscola | Michigan Central Railroad | |
| Trolley Line Trail | 2.8 | 4.5 | Genesee | Pere Marquette Railway | |
| Vassar Rail Trail | 2.0 | 3.2 | Tuscola | Michigan Central Railroad | |

== Southwest Michigan ==
| Trail name | Length (mi) | Length (km) | Counties | Original railroad | References |
|---|---|---|---|---|---|
| Indiana-Michigan River Valley Trail | 5.3 | 8.5 | Berrien | Cleveland, Cincinnati, Chicago and St. Louis Railway | |
| Kal-Haven Trail | 34.5 | 55.5 | Kalamazoo, Van Buren | Kalamazoo and South Haven Railroad | |
| Kalamazoo River Valley Trail | 20.9 | 33.6 | Kalamazoo | Grand Rapids and Indiana Railroad | |
| Main Trail | 0.5 | 0.80 | Calhoun | Michigan United Railways | |
| Paul Henry–Thornapple Rail Trail | 42 | 68 | Barry, Eaton, Kent | Michigan Central Railroad | |
| Shaver Road Bikeway | 1.8 | 2.9 | Kalamazoo | Grand Rapids and Indiana Railroad | |
| Van Buren Trail State Park | 14 | 23 | Van Buren | Toledo and South Haven Railroad | |
| Vicksburg Trailway | 1.8 | 2.9 | Kalamazoo | Grand Trunk Western Railroad | |

== Southeast Michigan and Metro Detroit ==
| Trail name | Length (mi) | Length (km) | Counties | Original railroad | References |
|---|---|---|---|---|---|
| Baw Beese Trail | 8.2 | 13.2 | Hillsdale | Lake Shore and Michigan Southern Railway | |
| Bridge to Bay Trail | 37.5 | 60.4 | St. Clair | Port Huron and Detroit Railroad | |
| Clinton River Trail | 16 | 26 | Oakland | Grand Trunk Western Railroad | |
| Dequindre Cut | 1.6 | 2.6 | Wayne | Grand Trunk Western Railroad | |
| Huron Valley Trail | 12.2 | 19.6 | Oakland | Grand Trunk Western Railroad | |
| Kiwanis Trail | 8 | 13 | Lenawee | Tecumseh Branch Connecting Railroad | |
| Lakelands Trail State Park | 26 | 42 | Ingham, Livingston, Washtenaw | Grand Trunk Western Railroad | |
| Litchfield Nature Trail | 2 | 3.2 | Hillsdale | New York Central Railroad | |
| Macomb Orchard Trail | 23.7 | 38.1 | Macomb | Canadian National Railway | |
| Martin Luther King Equality Trail | 3.4 | 5.5 | Jackson | Michigan Central Railroad | |
| Michigan Air Line Trail | 270 | 430 | Calhoun, Ingham, Jackson, Kalamazoo, Livingston, Macomb, Oakland, St. Clair, Van Buren | Michigan Air Line Railroad | |
| Paint Creek Trail | 8.9 | 14.3 | Oakland | Michigan Central Railroad | |
| Polly Ann Trail | 34.2 | 55.0 | Lapeer, Oakland | Pontiac, Oxford, & Northern Railroad | |
| Riverbend Preserve Rail-Trail | 0.1 | 0.16 | Washtenaw | Penn Central Rail Road | |
| Wadhams to Avoca Trail | 12 | 19 | St. Clair | Pere Marquette Railway | |
| West Bloomfield Trail | 6.8 | 10.9 | Oakland | Grand Trunk Western Railroad | |

== Images ==
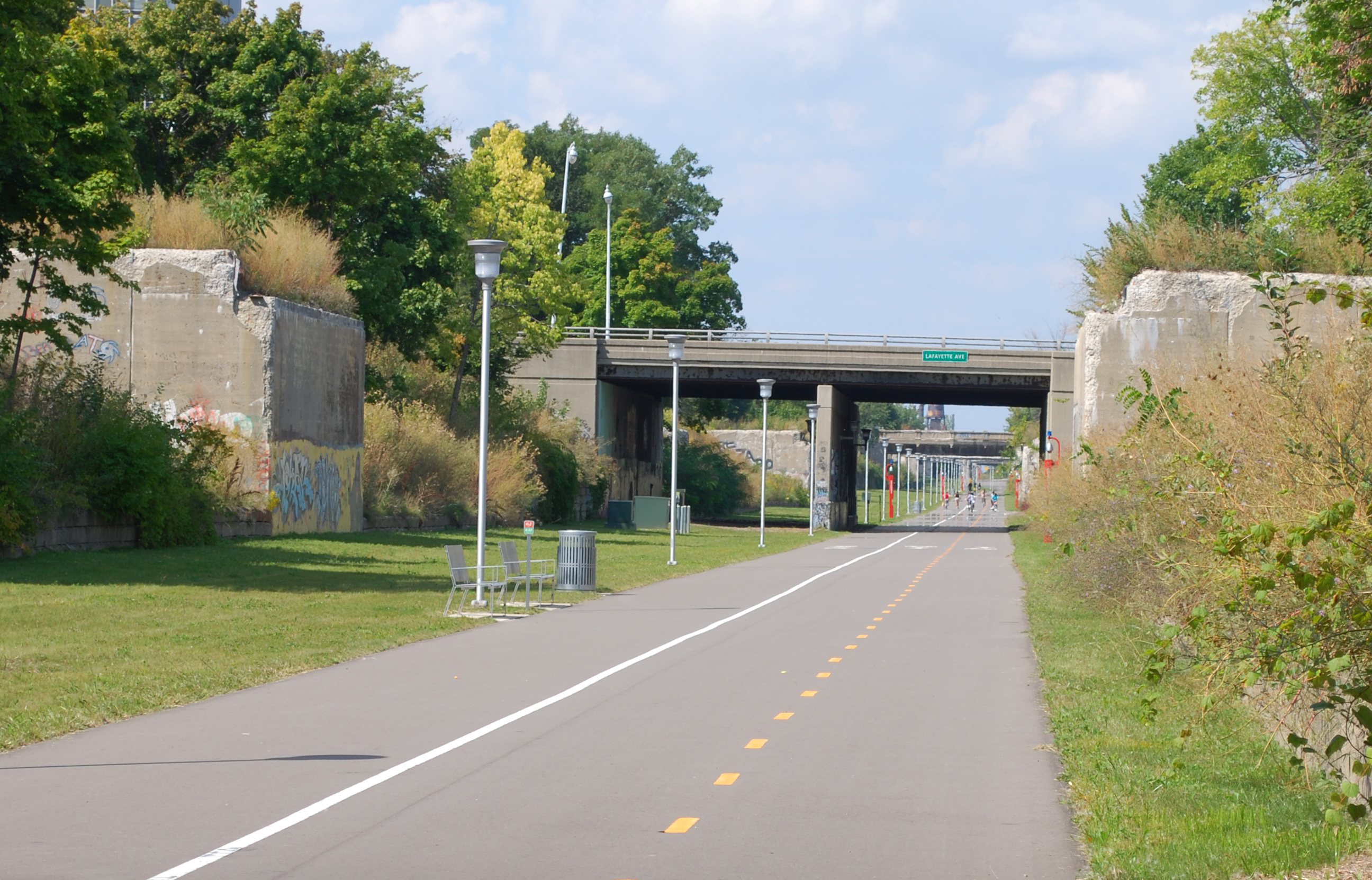
Dequindre Cut

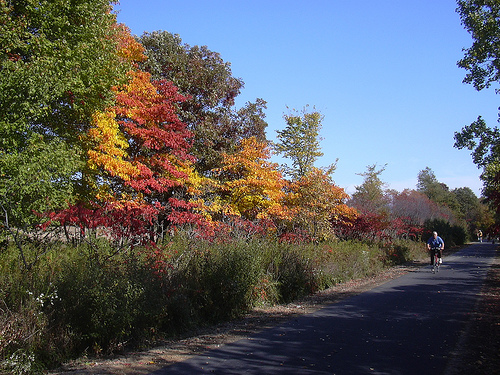
Fred Meijer Heartland Trail

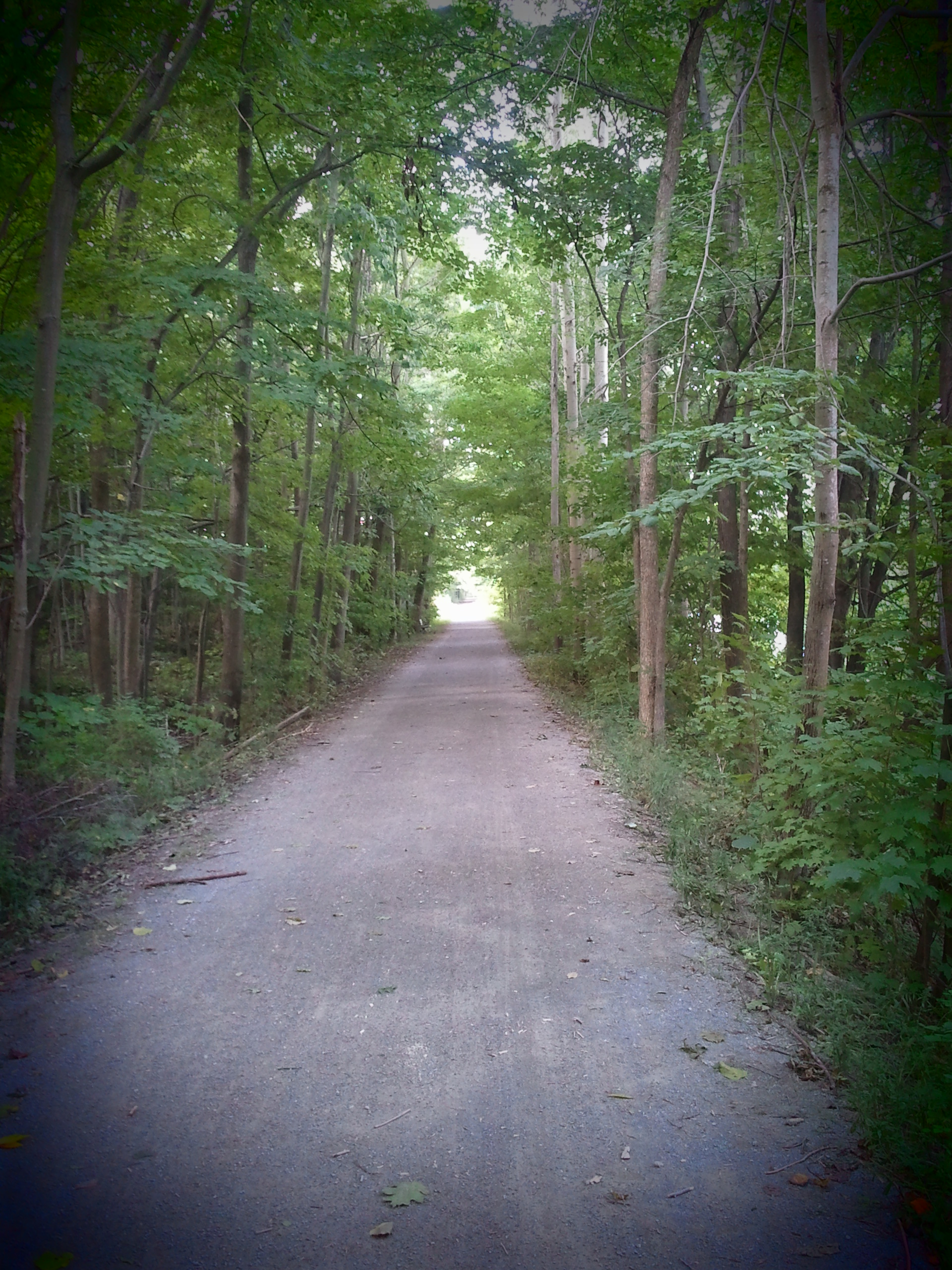
Kal-Haven Trail

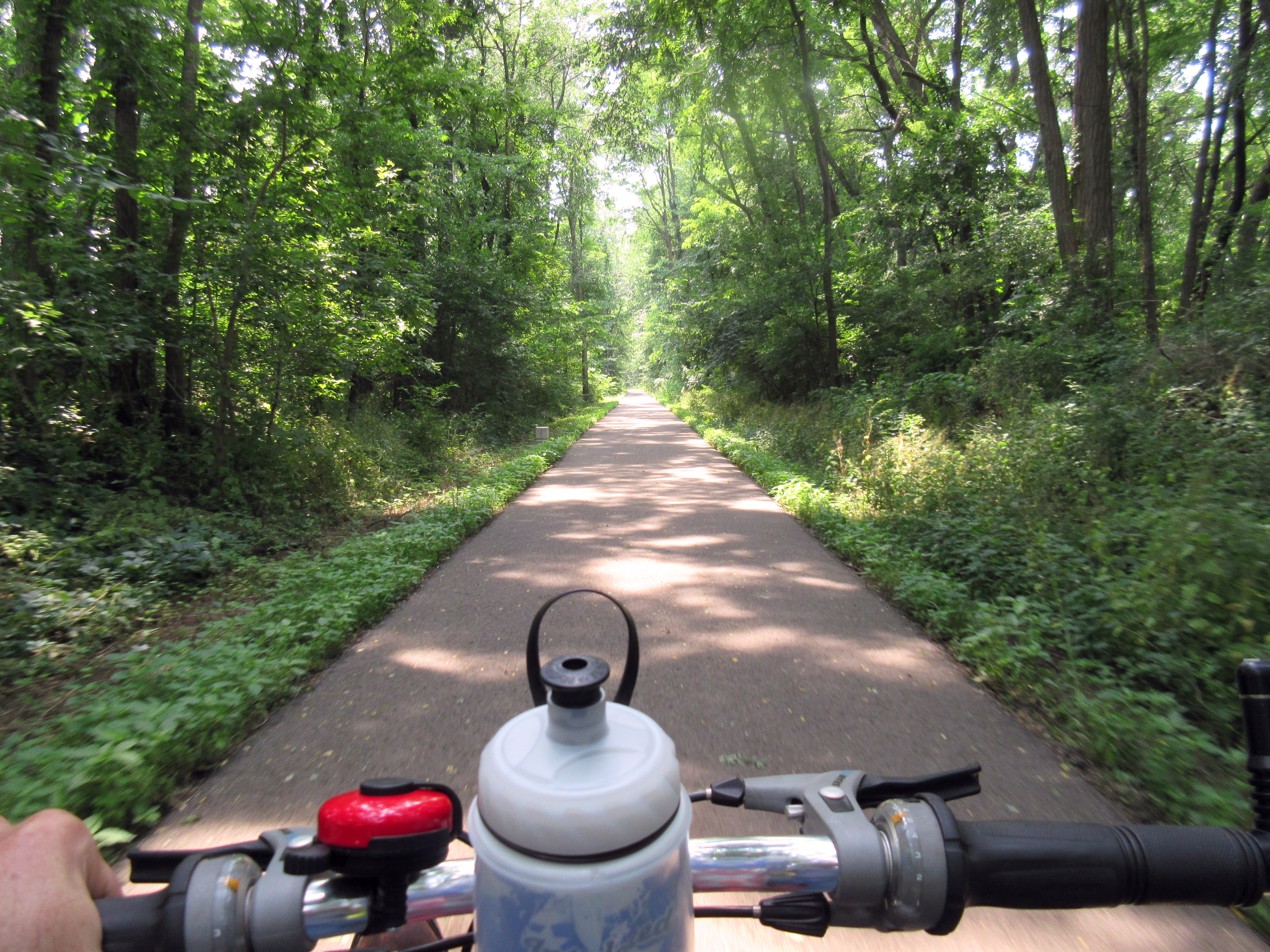
Kiwanis Trail

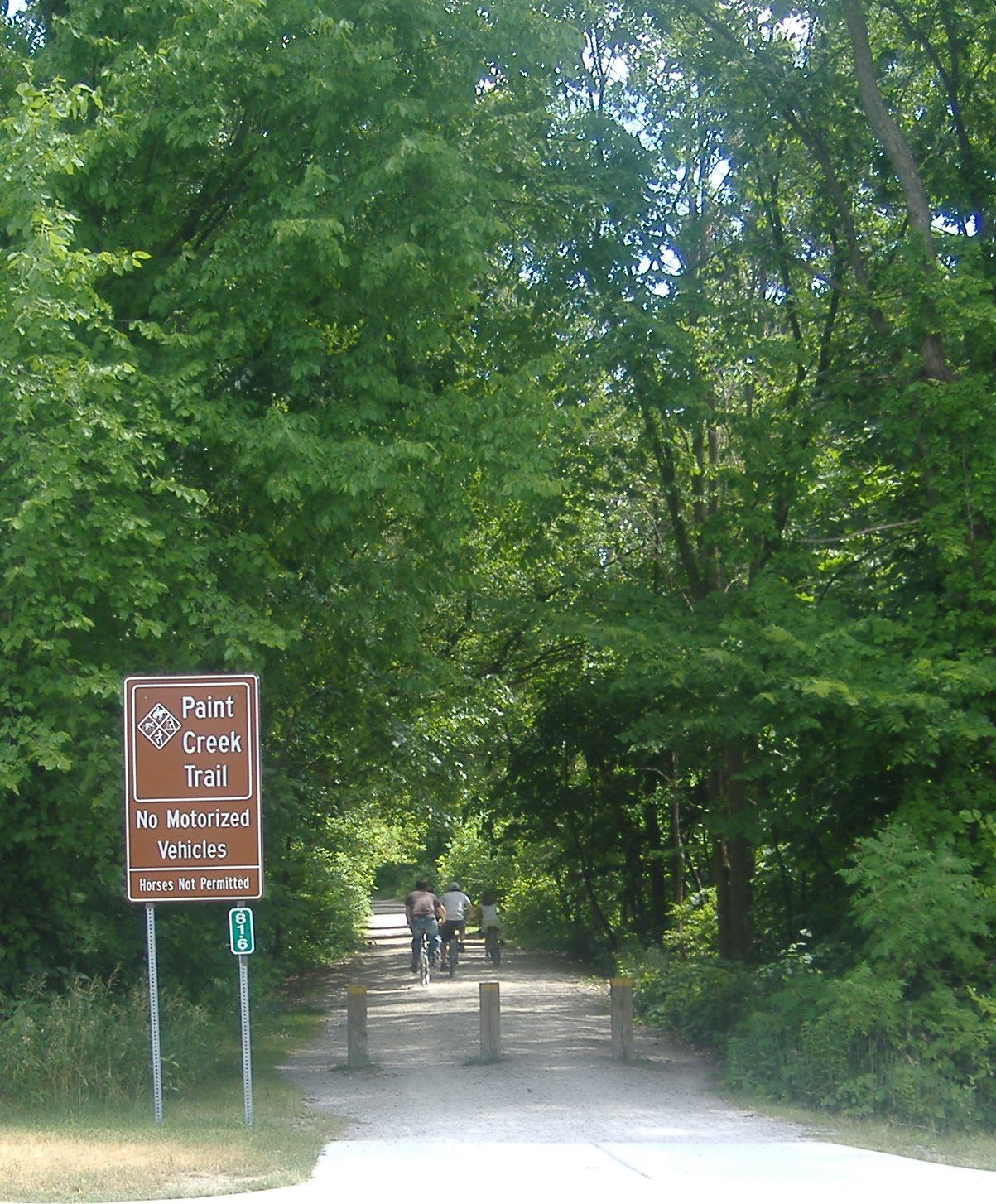
Paint Creek Trail

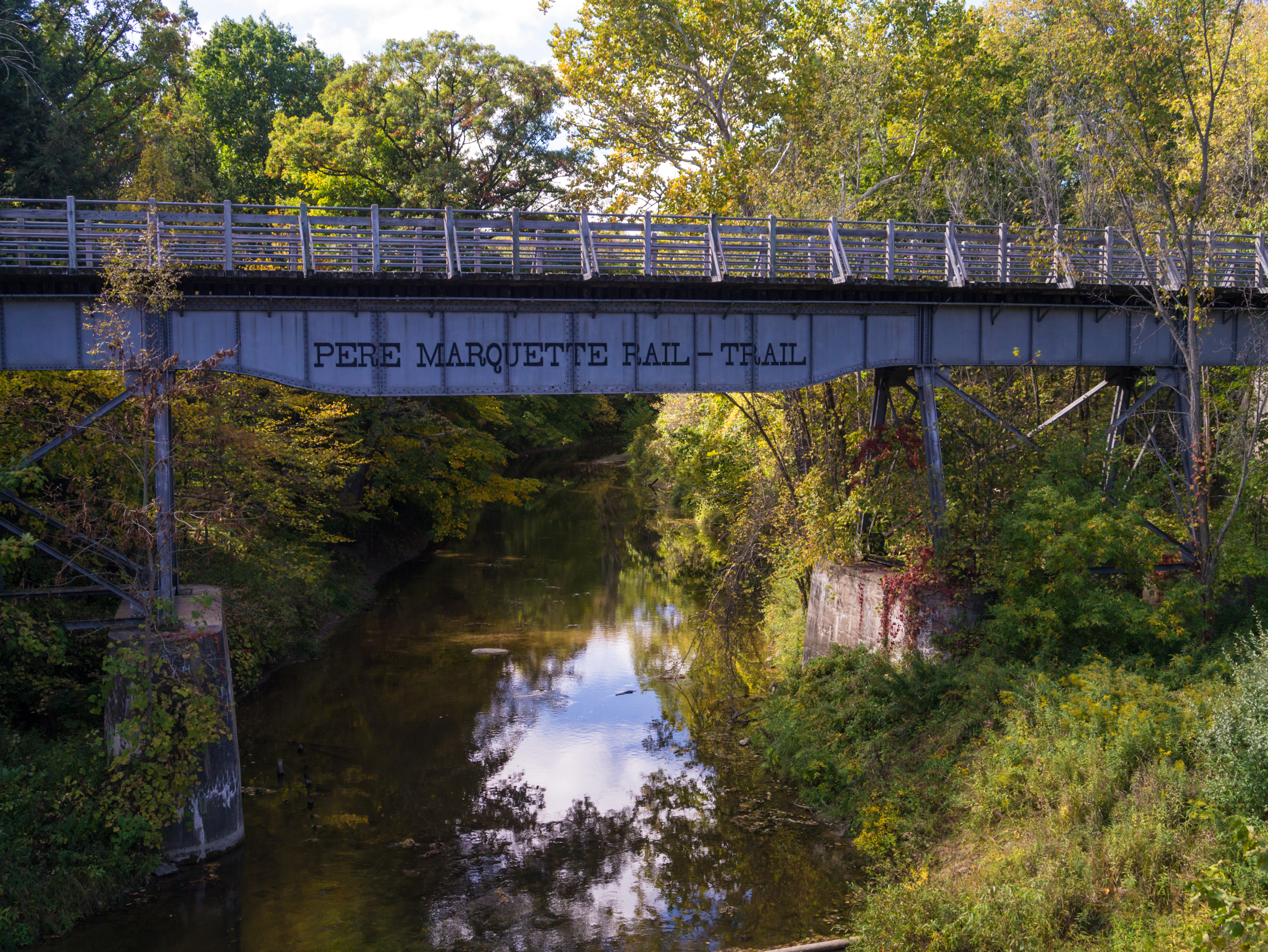
Pere Marquette Rail-Trail

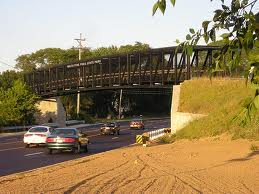
White Pine Trail

== See also ==
- List of rail trails in the United States
- List of Michigan state parks
- Rails with trails
