= Michigan Air-Line Railway =

Railroad in Oakland County, Michigan, United States

Michigan Air–Line Railway
Overview
- Headquarters: Walled Lake, Michigan
- Reporting mark: MAL
- Locale: Oakland County, Michigan
- Dates of operation: 2006–2011
- Predecessor: Coe Rail, Inc./Grand Trunk Western

Technical
- Track gauge: 4 ft 8 1/2 in (1,435 mm) standard gauge
- Length: 8.07 miles

The Michigan Air–Line Railway (reporting mark MAL) was a short-line railroad in Oakland County, Michigan, United States. It ran from West Bloomfield, Michigan to Wixom, Michigan, where it connected to CSX. The headquarters and station were in Walled Lake, Michigan. The name was owned by Railmark Holdings, Inc. The railroad ran its last Michigan Star Clipper Dinner Train on December 31, 2008.

On November 12, 2009, Railmark announced that it was selling the railroad to Browner Turnout.

With the Michigan Star Clipper Dinner Train no longer in service, the Eastern end of the railroad from Haggerty Rd. to Arrowhead Rd. (6.9 miles) was no longer needed and sold to West Bloomfield Parks and Recreation Commission. It was used to complete the West Bloomfield Trail.

On January 28, 2011, the railroad applied with federal officials to abandon its remaining 5.45 mile route from the interchange in Wixom to the end of track now at Haggerty Rd. Abandonment was approved on October 18, 2011. The remaining railroad was removed in spring of 2012.

The 5.45 miles which were removed in 2012 became the Michigan Airline Railway Trail, connected on the East to the West Bloomfield Trail and on the West to the Huron Valley Trail. All are key parts of the 240 miles long Great Lake to Lake Trail Route 1 which will follow the old Michigan Air Line Railroad across the state.
