= Clinton River Trail =

Rail trail in Oakland County, Michigan, US

- Length: 16 mi
- Location: Oakland County, Michigan
- Use: Hiking, bicycling, roller blading, and cross country skiing
- Surface: Asphalt, gravel

The Clinton River Trail is a 16-mile-long rail trail in Oakland County, Michigan. It links the West Bloomfield Trail to the west and the Macomb Orchard Trail to the east, and is a segment of the Iron Belle Trail and Great Lake to Lake Trail Route 1. From west to east, the trail is within the cities of Sylvan Lake, Pontiac, Auburn Hills, Rochester Hills, and Rochester, Michigan.

Parts of the trail run along the Clinton River. From west to east, the trail is mostly downhill, with an elevation of 940 ft. in Sylvan Lake and 690 ft. east of Rochester.

== History ==
The Michigan Air Line Railway company was formed in 1875 and in 1880 built tracks between Pontiac and Rochester. That same year, Grand Trunk Western Railroad acquired the track. The company abandoned the railroad in 1998 and the rails were removed in 1999.

In 2003, Rails to Trails Conservancy funded a master plan to establish the trail. Hikers and cyclists used the railroad bed before it officially opened in spring 2004.

There were once three detours in place that took users off the former rail route: Crossing Telegraph Road in Pontiac, crossing I-75 in Auburn Hills, and through downtown Pontiac. Over the years, solutions were funded to close these gaps:

- A bridge across I-75 opened in fall 2003.
- A bridge across Telegraph Road was built in 2012.
- In 2023, Pontiac received funding for the Pike Street Clinton River Trail Connector Project, which would build a pathway along Pike Street and begin the North Spur Trail (using the abandoned railroad line that branches to the north and becomes the Polly Ann Trail in Orion Township). It would connect the Clinton River Trail at Bagley Street on Pontiac's west side to the trail at Opdyke Road on the east side.
