= Kiwanis (disambiguation) =

Kiwanis International is an international service club founded in 1915 and found in more than 80 nations and geographic areas

Kiwanis may also refer to:

== Places ==
- Kiwanis Field, ballpark in Salem, Virginia
- Kiwanis Lake, lake located in Kiwanis Community Park in central Tempe, Arizona
- Kiwanis Park, New Brunswick, Canada
- Kiwanis Ravine, a public park in the Magnolia neighborhood of Seattle, Washington
- Kiwanis Trail, a rail to trail conversion in Adrian, Michigan
- Kiwanis Park (Columbia, Missouri), United States

== Others ==
- Kiwanis Music Festival, regional music competitions organized by Kiwanis service clubs

== See also ==
- Kiwan
