= Bingham Township, Michigan =

Bingham Township is the name of several places in the U.S. state of Michigan:

- Bingham Township, Clinton County, Michigan
- Bingham Township, Huron County, Michigan
- Bingham Township, Leelanau County, Michigan

== See also ==
- Bingham Township (disambiguation)
