= Suttons Bay station =

- Leelanau Transit Company Suttons Bay Depot
- U.S. National Register of Historic Places
- Michigan State Historic Site
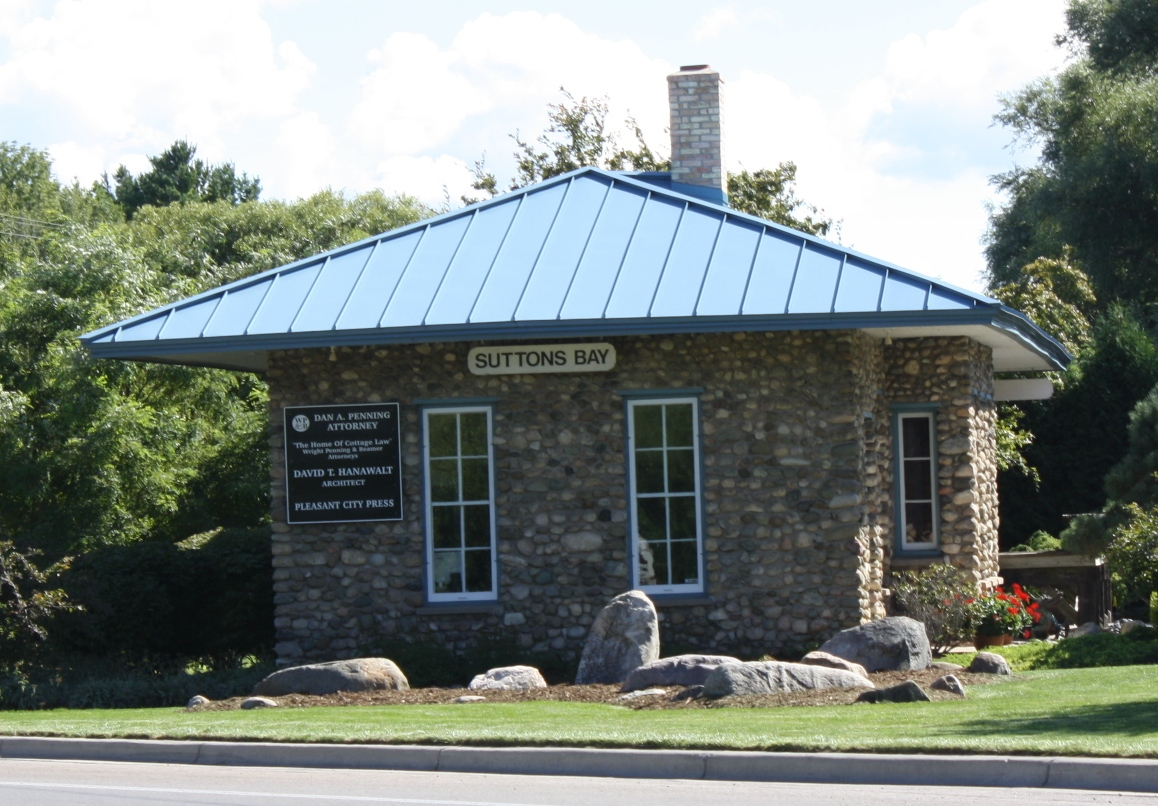

- Location within Michigan Location within the United States
- Interactive map
- Location: 101 S. Cedar St., Suttons Bay, Michigan
- Coordinates: 44°58′26″N 85°39′3″W
- Area: 0.1 acres (0.040 ha)
- Architectural style: Bungalow/craftsman
- NRHP reference No.: 97000929

Significant dates
- Added to NRHP: August 21, 1997
- Designated MSHS: September 4, 1997

The Leelanau Transit Company Suttons Bay Depot, also known as the Suttons Bay Railroad Depot, is a railroad station located at 101 South Cedar Street in Suttons Bay, Michigan. It was designated a Michigan State Historic Site and listed on the National Register of Historic Places in 1997.

== History ==
The main track through Suttons Bay was laid down in 1903 by the Traverse City, Leelanau, and Manistique Railroad, to access a Northport-Manistique car ferry. A siding was built a few years later; however, the railway was immediately unsuccessful and the ferry was discontinued by 1908. In 1919, a successor company, the Leelanau Transit Company was organized to take over ownership of the tracks. They leased the line to the Manistee and North-Eastern Railroad and built this depot between the main line and siding in Suttons Bay as a passenger and freight station.

In the 1960s, the tracks north of Suttons Bay were abandoned. The track section between Suttons Bay and Traverse City were used by the Leelanau Scenic Railroad between 1989 and 1995. In 1996, the track were torn up and a rail trail put in its place. The depot is used as a law office.

== Description ==
The Suttons Bay Railroad Depot is a single-story Arts-and-Crafts-inspired structure with a hip roof, built of rounded cobblestones. The roof overhangs widely on all sides of the building, sheltering the walls and the trackside platform.
