= Bingham Township, Leelanau County, Michigan =

Bingham Township, Michigan
- Civil township
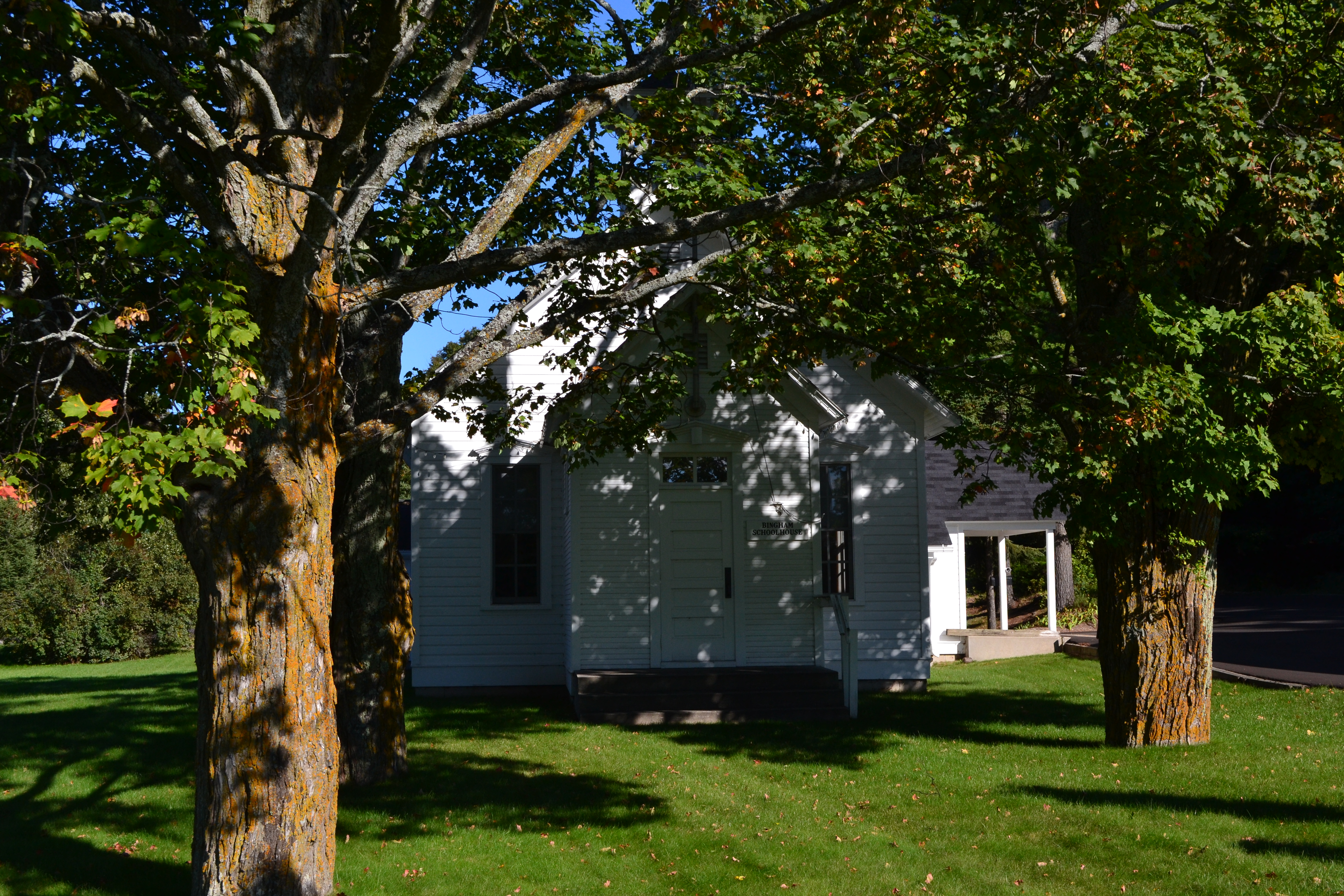
- Bingham District No. 5 Schoolhouse

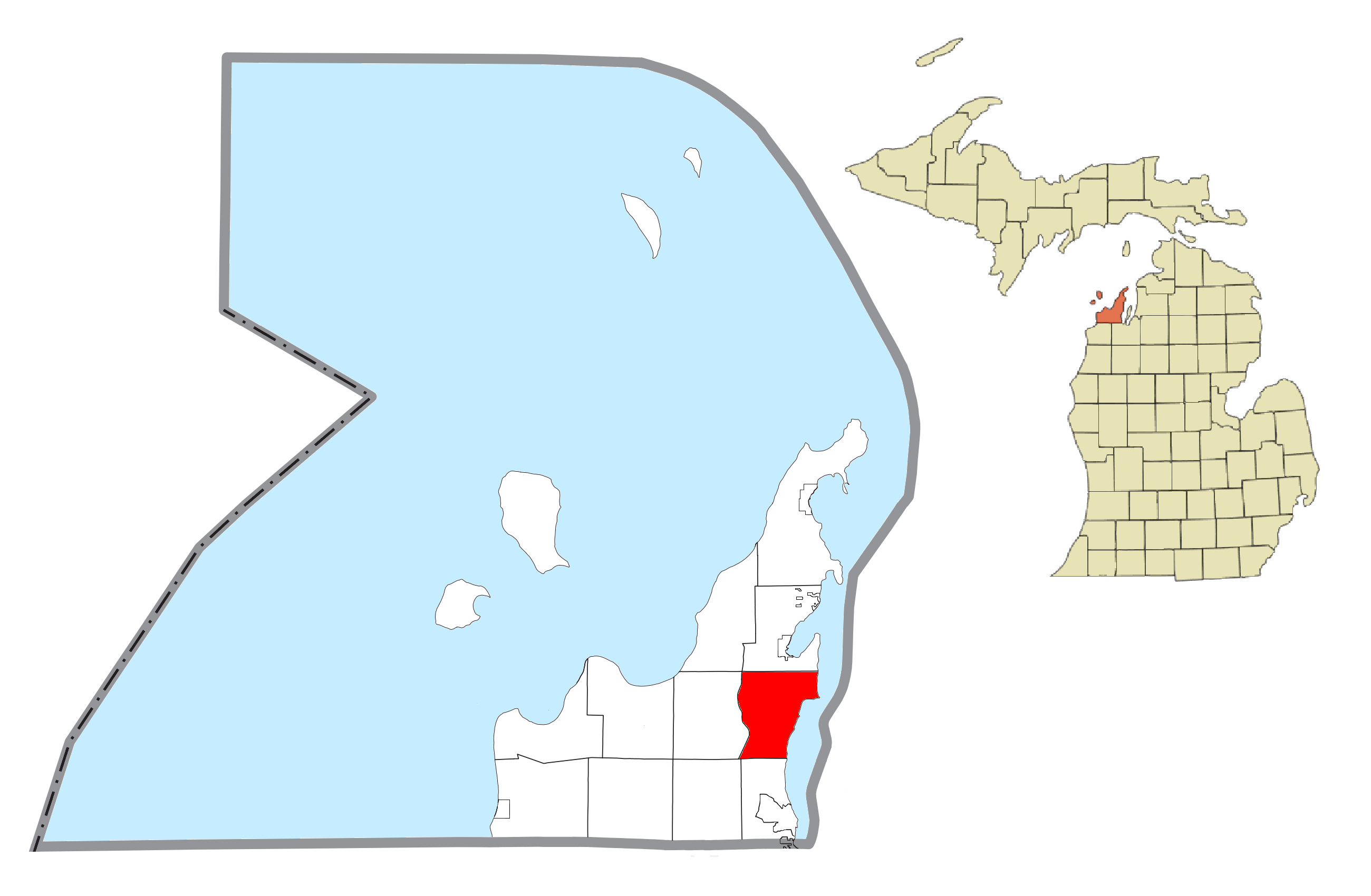
- Location within Leelanau County

- Location within the state of Michigan Bingham Township (the United States)
- Coordinates: 44°55′13″N 85°39′59″W
- Country: United States
- State: Michigan
- County: Leelanau
- Organized: 1864
- Named for: Kinsley S. Bingham

Area
  - Total: 39.3 sq mi (101.8 km^{2})
  - Land: 23.6 sq mi (61.1 km^{2})
  - Water: 15.8 sq mi (40.8 km^{2})
- Elevation: 725 ft (221 m)

Population (2020)
  - Total: 2,577
  - Density: 103/sq mi (39.7/km^{2})
- Time zone: UTC-5 (Eastern (EST))
  - Summer (DST): UTC-4 (EDT)
- ZIP code(s): 49653 (Lake Leelanau); 49682 (Suttons Bay); 49684 (Traverse City)
- Area code: 231
- FIPS code: 26-08440
- GNIS feature ID: 1625939

Bingham Township (/ˈbɪŋəm/ BING-əm) is a civil township of Leelanau County in the U.S. state of Michigan. As of the 2020 census, the township population was 2,577. The township is named for Kinsley S. Bingham, a U.S. representative, U.S. senator, and governor of Michigan.

== History ==
Bingham Township was created in 1864 from part of Centerville Township.

== Communities ==
- Bingham (44°52′33″N 85°40′27.29″W) is an unincorporated community within Bingham Township. A post office was established in the area in 1878, and a sawmill built in 1881. The post office at Bingham closed in 1908. In 1903, an extension of the Manistee and North-Eastern Railroad was extended from Traverse City via Bingham and Suttons Bay to Northport, although it was removed in 1996, and was replaced by the Leelanau Trail, a recreational rail trail.
- Keswick (44°55′44″N 85°39′13.29″W) is a ghost town within Bingham Township. Named for Keswick, New Brunswick, Canada, Keswick was established with a rural post office operating from 1889 to 1910.

== Geography ==
According to the United States Census Bureau, the township has a total area of 39.3 square miles (101.8 km^{2}), of which 23.6 square miles (61.1 km^{2}) is land and 15.8 square miles (40.8 km^{2}) (40.06%) is water.

Bingham Township is on the shore of the West Arm of Grand Traverse Bay, a bay of Lake Michigan. Bingham Township is also bounded to the west by Lake Leelanau, effectively making Bingham Township an isthmus.

=== Major highway ===
- M-22 is a north–south highway that runs along the shore of Grand Traverse Bay, in eastern Bingham Township. To the south, M-22 runs to Greilickville before ending at Traverse City. To the north, M-22 runs through Suttons Bay to Northport, before turning back southwest and paralleling the shore of Lake Michigan to Manistee.

=== Climate ===
According to the Köppen Climate Classification system, Bingham has a warm-summer humid continental climate, abbreviated "Dfb" on climate maps. The hottest temperature recorded in Bingham was 99 °F (37.2 °C) on August 1, 2006, while the coldest temperature recorded was −14 °F (−25.6 °C) on February 20, 2015.

Climate data for Bingham, Michigan (Northwest Michigan Research Farm), 1991–2020 normals, extremes 1998–present
Month	Jan	Feb	Mar	Apr	May	Jun	Jul	Aug	Sep	Oct	Nov	Dec	Year
Record high °F (°C)	52 (11)	62 (17)	84 (29)	88 (31)	93 (34)	95 (35)	96 (36)	99 (37)	93 (34)	88 (31)	76 (24)	64 (18)	99 (37)
Mean maximum °F (°C)	45.5 (7.5)	47.3 (8.5)	60.2 (15.7)	73.6 (23.1)	85.7 (29.8)	89.0 (31.7)	91.5 (33.1)	89.7 (32.1)	86.9 (30.5)	77.2 (25.1)	64.0 (17.8)	51.4 (10.8)	93.1 (33.9)
Mean daily maximum °F (°C)	27.4 (−2.6)	29.0 (−1.7)	38.4 (3.6)	51.0 (10.6)	64.5 (18.1)	74.5 (23.6)	78.6 (25.9)	77.3 (25.2)	70.1 (21.2)	56.5 (13.6)	43.7 (6.5)	33.0 (0.6)	53.7 (12.0)
Daily mean °F (°C)	22.9 (−5.1)	23.8 (−4.6)	31.4 (−0.3)	42.7 (5.9)	55.0 (12.8)	65.1 (18.4)	69.9 (21.1)	68.9 (20.5)	61.9 (16.6)	49.8 (9.9)	38.5 (3.6)	29.0 (−1.7)	46.6 (8.1)
Mean daily minimum °F (°C)	18.5 (−7.5)	18.6 (−7.4)	24.5 (−4.2)	34.4 (1.3)	45.4 (7.4)	55.7 (13.2)	61.1 (16.2)	60.4 (15.8)	53.7 (12.1)	43.2 (6.2)	33.4 (0.8)	24.9 (−3.9)	39.5 (4.2)
Mean minimum °F (°C)	5.2 (−14.9)	2.5 (−16.4)	8.1 (−13.3)	22.9 (−5.1)	32.8 (0.4)	42.5 (5.8)	52.3 (11.3)	51.5 (10.8)	43.7 (6.5)	33.1 (0.6)	22.8 (−5.1)	12.7 (−10.7)	0.1 (−17.7)
Record low °F (°C)	−3 (−19)	−14 (−26)	−10 (−23)	14 (−10)	26 (−3)	37 (3)	44 (7)	44 (7)	35 (2)	29 (−2)	13 (−11)	3 (−16)	−14 (−26)
Average precipitation inches (mm)	1.82 (46)	1.38 (35)	1.58 (40)	2.84 (72)	2.88 (73)	2.68 (68)	2.66 (68)	3.20 (81)	3.50 (89)	3.89 (99)	2.68 (68)	2.05 (52)	31.16 (791)
Average snowfall inches (cm)	32.0 (81)	22.3 (57)	13.4 (34)	6.8 (17)	0.0 (0.0)	0.0 (0.0)	0.0 (0.0)	0.0 (0.0)	0.0 (0.0)	0.3 (0.76)	10.4 (26)	29.3 (74)	114.5 (289.76)
Average extreme snow depth inches (cm)	12.5 (32)	13.6 (35)	11.9 (30)	3.7 (9.4)	0.0 (0.0)	0.0 (0.0)	0.0 (0.0)	0.0 (0.0)	0.0 (0.0)	0.1 (0.25)	5.0 (13)	10.1 (26)	16.9 (43)
Average precipitation days (≥ 0.01 in)	17.5	12.6	10.3	11.5	12.5	9.9	9.4	9.0	10.8	14.9	14.3	16.2	148.9
Average snowy days (≥ 0.1 in)	16.7	11.9	7.3	3.4	0.1	0.0	0.0	0.0	0.0	0.3	6.2	13.8	59.7
Source 1: NOAA
Source 2: National Weather Service (mean maxima/minima, snow depth 2006–2020)

== Demographics ==
As of the census of 2000, there were 2,425 people, 944 households, and 731 families residing in the township. The population density was 102.8 inhabitants per square mile (39.7/km^{2}). There were 1,200 housing units at an average density of 50.9 per square mile (19.7/km^{2}). The racial makeup of the township was 96.74% White, 0.08% African American, 1.61% Native American, 0.29% Asian, 0.58% from other races, and 0.70% from two or more races. Hispanic or Latino of any race were 1.73% of the population.

There were 944 households, out of which 33.2% had children under the age of 18 living with them, 69.4% were married couples living together, 5.8% had a female householder with no husband present, and 22.5% were non-families. 18.9% of all households were made up of individuals, and 6.8% had someone living alone who was 65 years of age or older. The average household size was 2.56 and the average family size was 2.91.

In the township the population was spread out, with 24.6% under the age of 18, 6.6% from 18 to 24, 24.2% from 25 to 44, 29.6% from 45 to 64, and 15.0% who were 65 years of age or older. The median age was 42 years. For every 100 females, there were 100.2 males. For every 100 females age 18 and over, there were 98.2 males.

The median income for a household in the township was $52,813, and the median income for a family was $56,964. Males had a median income of $37,121 versus $25,991 for females. The per capita income for the township was $25,936. About 3.5% of families and 5.1% of the population were below the poverty line, including 7.6% of those under age 18 and 5.1% of those age 65 or over.

== See also ==
- Leelanau Trail
- Leelanau Transit Company
