= Gete Mino Mshkiigan State Park =

Future Michigan State Park currently under development in Cheboygan County, Michigan

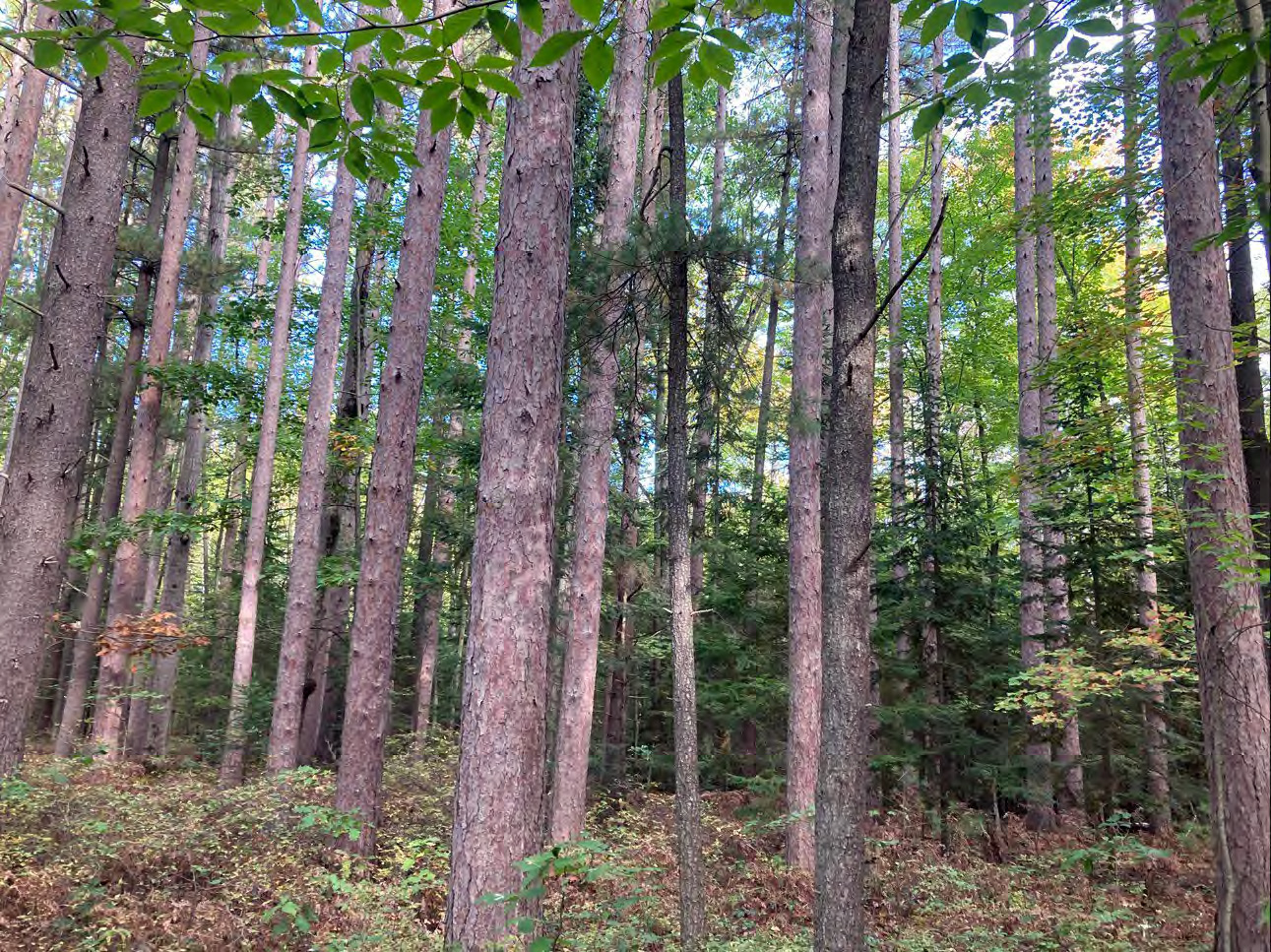
- A stand of natural red pine in Gete Mino Mshkiigan State Park.

- Location within Michigan Location within the United States
- Location: Topinabee, Michigan
- Coordinates: 45°27′58″N 84°36′3″W
- Area: 147 acres (59 ha)
- Elevation: 642 feet (196 m)
- Designation: Michigan state park
- Established: 2013
- Administrator: Michigan DNR
- Website: Official website

Gete Mino Mshkiigan, pronounced “geh-teh-mino-mush-key-gun,” is an undeveloped state park located in Cheboygan County in the U.S. state of Michigan. The park occupies 147 acres (59 ha) along the shores of Mullett Lake. The North Central State Trail, a 75-mile long state-owned rail trail, runs through the property close to the shoreline of the lake. The shoreline itself consists of 1,500 feet of undeveloped lakefront. According to the Michigan Department of Natural Resources (DNR), "the undulating terrain is dominated by mixed coniferous/deciduous forest, with approximately 35% of the land identified as emergent wetlands."

== History ==
Much of the land in the northern Lower Peninsula of Michigan was logged by lumber companies in the late 1800s and early 1900s, including the area around Mullett Lake. The area occupied by the park reverted to State ownership in 1904 due to non-payment of taxes, likely being abandoned after being logged over. The State sold the property to private landowners between 1911 and 1937, with Jennie Johnson being one long-time owner before the tract was sold to Marty S. Miller. The Little Traverse Conservancy (LTC) purchased the property in 2008 to preserve the land from development.

The Michigan DNR purchased the largely-undeveloped, 147 acres (59 ha) so-called "Jennie Johnson Tract" from the LTC in 2013 using funds from the Michigan Natural Resources Trust Fund, State Trailways Initiative. A General Management Plan (GMP) for the property was completed by the DNR in 2023, which will guide the development of the park going forward. After acquisition, the State cleared the remaining structures and the property has been open hunting and trapping, although it is closed to off-road vehicle (ORV) use. As there is no on-site staff, the property is managed by the Department of Natural Resources Parks and Recreation Division (PRD) out of the Cheboygan Field Office. While the State had originally intended to transfer ownership of the site to the DNR's Forest Resources Division (FRD), it was later determined management by the PRD would be more appropriate with the site's location straddling the North Central State Trail.

== Activities and amenities ==
As an undeveloped state park, there are currently no developed recreational amenities on site, other than the maintained North Central State Trail cutting through the east side of the park. A beach exists along Mullet Lake and the former two-track roads on the property provide unmarked trails for hiking. No dedicated parking currently exists, although visitors may park on the shoulder of M-27 (N. Straits Hwy.) to access the site.

== Park name ==
According to the Michigan DNR, the Gete Mino Mshkiigan name:

was suggested by the current and former Tribal Historic Preservation Officers of the Little Traverse Bay Bands of Odawa Indians. The name roughly translates from Anishinaabemowin to English as Ancient Good Wetlands, capturing the land’s history, beauty, abundance, and centrality within the larger wetland chain that is the Inland Waterway.

== See also ==
- North Central State Trail: a state-maintained trail running through the east side of the park.
