= Boardman Lake Trail =

Trail

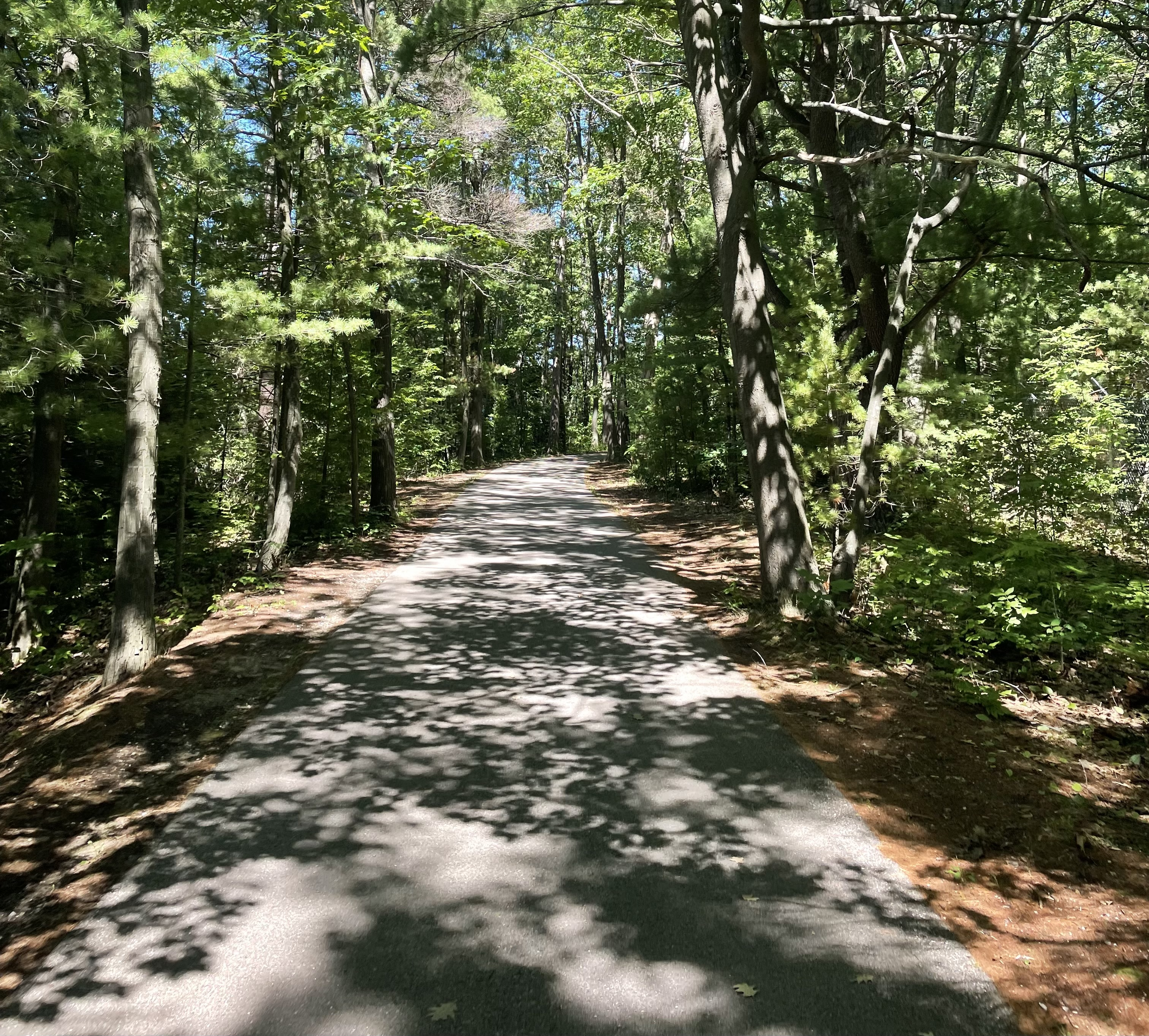
- Location: Traverse City and Garfield Township, Michigan
- Established: 2005
- Completed: 2022
- Use: Walking, running, biking, rollerblading
- Difficulty: Easy
- Surface: Asphalt, crushed limestone
- Website: traversetrails.org/trails/boardman-lake-loop-trail/

The Boardman Lake Trail or Boardman Lake Loop Trail (colloquially referred to as the "BLT" or "BLLT") is a 4-mile (6.4 km) recreational trail in Traverse City, Michigan. Established in 2005 and completed in 2022, the trail encircles Boardman Lake, and features a number of bridges over the lake and Boardman River. The trail connects to and is part of the TART Trail system.

== See also ==
- List of rail trails in Michigan
