= Great Lake to Lake Trail Route 1 =

Cycling and hiking trail in Michigan

The Great Lake to Lake Trail Route 1 is a 275-mile trail route connecting South Haven on the west side of Michigan to Port Huron on the east side, forming a route between Lake Michigan and Lake Huron for cyclists and hikers. The route incorporates several preexisting rail trails and, although 78 percent complete, some on-road gaps are present.

== History ==
Originally known as the Airline Trail, the route was discussed in a master plan proposed by the Michigan Trails and Greenways Alliance in 2007. As of 2011, the Michigan Department of Transportation and Michigan Department of Natural Resources were collaborating on planning a trail route between South Haven and Port Huron. The Michigan Trails and Greenways Alliance, a trail advocacy organization composed of nonprofit groups, governments, and businesses, also collaborated. Together, they designated five routes in different areas of the state, Route 1 being the southernmost.

By 2019, wayfinding signage and trailside kiosks had been installed, and in September of 2019 the trail officially opened with an inaugural bike ride.

As of 2025, efforts to close gaps in the trail continued, supported by funding from grants and philanthropic contributions.

== Historic railroad corridors ==
The Kal-Haven Trail in West Michigan is included in the route. It follows the rail bed of the former Kalamazoo and South Haven Railroad, later known as the Penn Central Railroad, which was abandoned in 1973. Between Jackson and Port Huron, the route follows the path of the Michigan Air Line Railway.

== Route ==
The trail incorporates several independent trail segments that retain their names and are funded and maintained separately. The segments of the trail include:

- Kal-Haven Trail
- Kalamazoo River Valley Trail
- Battle Creek Linear Park
- Marshall Riverwalk
- Albion River Trail
- Falling Waters Trail
- Lakelands Trail State Park
- Huron Valley Trail
- Michigan Air Line Trail
- West Bloomfield Trail
- Clinton River Trail
- Macomb Orchard Trail
- Port Huron Bridge to Bay Trail
