= Coe Rail, Inc. =

Rail line in Michigan, U.S.

Coe Rail
Overview
- Headquarters: Walled Lake, Michigan
- Reporting mark: CRLE
- Locale: Michigan
- Dates of operation: 1984–2006
- Predecessor: Grand Trunk Western Railway
- Successor: Michigan Air-Line Railway

Technical
- Track gauge: 4 ft 8 1/2 in (1,435 mm) standard gauge
- Length: 8.07 miles

Coe Rail was an excursion and freight rail line running between West Bloomfield and Wixom, Michigan, United States. It was best known for its Michigan Star Clipper Dinner Train.
