= Michigan Star Clipper Dinner Train =

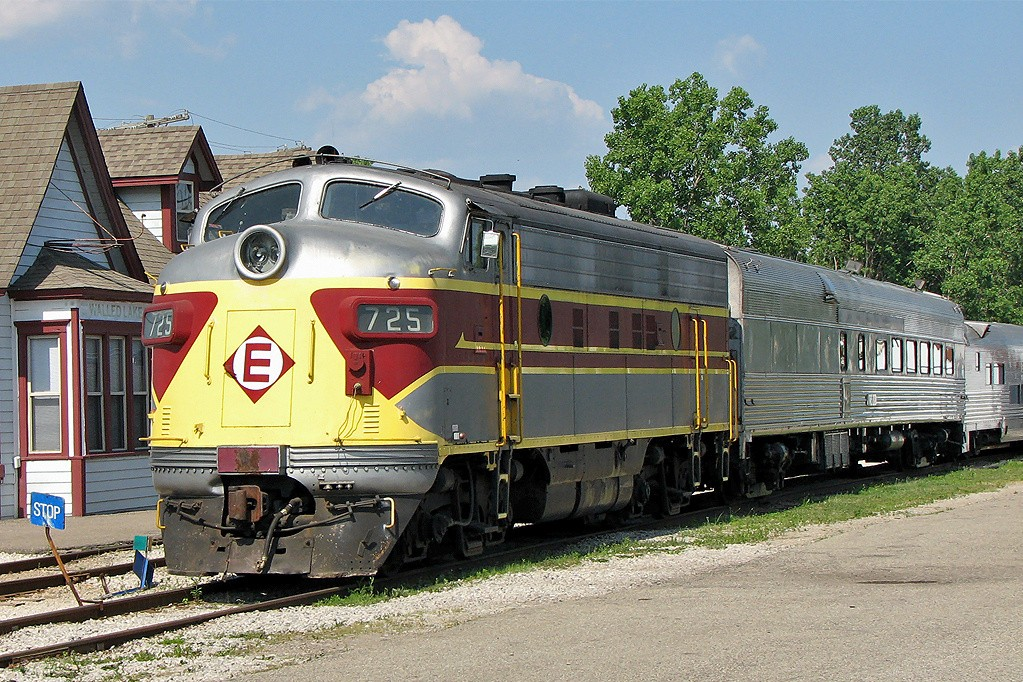
The Michigan Star Clipper Dinner Train in 2007

The Michigan Star Clipper Dinner Train was a dinner train that operated in Michigan for 24 years; first out of Paw Paw, for approximately two years, then from Walled Lake, with trips heading from West Bloomfield to Wixom, where it connected to the CSX mainline and then back to West Bloomfield, MI. On December 31, 2008, the operators of the dinner train announced that they would be shutting down the route due to poor ridership and increased costs in fuel and other various expenses.

== History ==
Jack Haley, founder of the original Star Clipper in Cedar Rapids, Iowa, was flying back to Iowa after meeting with a representative in the Providence, RI area, to set up his second dinner train operation. While en route, his aircraft experienced mechanical difficulties, and they made an unscheduled landing at the Kalamazoo, MI airport. They were told repairs would take some time, so Jack and his entourage decided to drive a few miles west to Paw Paw, Michigan, to check out the Kalamazoo, Lake Shore, & Chicago Railway tourist train operation.

The impromptu meeting with Mark Campbell, Kevin McKinney, and Jerry Pilcher of KLS&C Railway resulted in a deal to bring a Star Clipper Dinner Train to western Michigan to operate on the ex-C&O branch line, now operated by the KLS&C. A new siding was built in Paw Paw to accommodate the dinner train, and the Star Clipper staff soon begin advertising and taking reservations. The Star Clipper was a tenant on the tracks of the KLS&C, and each time it departed, it paid the KLS&C a "pull fee" to haul the dinner train out and back. The Star Clipper was wildly popular from the beginning, attracting diners from both the Chicago and Detroit metro markets. However, Jack Haley's corporation was saddled with a huge amount of debt and overhead, and into the second year of operation, they began to fall behind in their payments to the KLS&C. Sensing something was up, and not for the good of the Railway, the owners tried to purchase the Star Clipper away from the Haley group, but were unable to persuade a majority investor to go along with them. The following day, the Michigan Star Clipper declared bankruptcy, and were now protected from making payments by the bankruptcy court. In fact, the Star Clipper was able to "claw back" tens of thousands of dollars that it had paid to the KLS&C, as they were payments for services rendered in the past, not contemporary or current.

In the end, the Michigan Star Clipper, through the auspices of the bankruptcy court, was able to make a deal with another short line in Michigan called Coe Rail, owned at the time by Larry Coe. As soon as the knowledge of this transaction took place, the owners of the KLS&C Railway began making plans to find replacement equipment to operate another dinner train over their railroad, as the concept had proven itself.

The Michigan Star Clipper dinner train operated for several years out of Walled Lake on approximately 8.07 miles (12.99 km) of the Michigan Air-Line Railway rail line. The Star Clipper first operated out of Osage, Iowa, in 1984. In 1985, Mr. Haley first teamed up with the KLS&C Railway in Paw Paw, Michigan. Mark Campbell, Kevin McKinney, and Jerry Pilcher were the owners who brought the train to Michigan, first to Paw Paw in 1985 and then to Walled Lake in 1986, where it has been ever since. The Iowa operations were discontinued in December 1987, with Mr. Haley’s decision to sell the railroad to an up-and-coming freight railroad conglomerate. The Star Clipper made a brief appearance in the Fort Worth, Texas, area, running two seasons during 1999 and 2000. In 2006, the Star Clipper Dinner Train was sold to Railmark Holdings, who increased and expanded both its programming and advertising in order to meet an ever changing and diverse ridership demographic in a world of internet communications. The trip started and finished from the historic Walled Lake Coe Rail depot, in operation since 1887, on Pontiac Trail Rd. in Walled Lake, MI. The trip was on the Michigan Air-Line Railway which dead-ended into the main line owned by CSX. The locomotive for the Michigan Star Clipper is a General Motors EMD F7 1,500-horsepower engine, built in 1950 for the Erie Lackawanna Railroad. The engine, rebuilt and computerized, is electric and operated the train smoothly at a top speed of 10 m.p.h.; even the drinks on the dining tables did not spill out.

== Entertainment ==
The Michigan Star Clipper dinner train offered three-hour, five course premium dinner trains; two-hour, three-course dinner trains; Sunday family dinner trains; luncheon trains; and children's lunch & breakfast trains. For certain events, passengers even had the option to stay overnight onboard one of the Pullman sleeping compartment cars. The various forms of entertainment while on an excursion included a murder mystery theatre, holiday themed theatre shows (Christmas, Easter, and a New Year's Eve show), musical reviews featuring various live performers, fall color tours, and various other special event venues.

== Meals ==
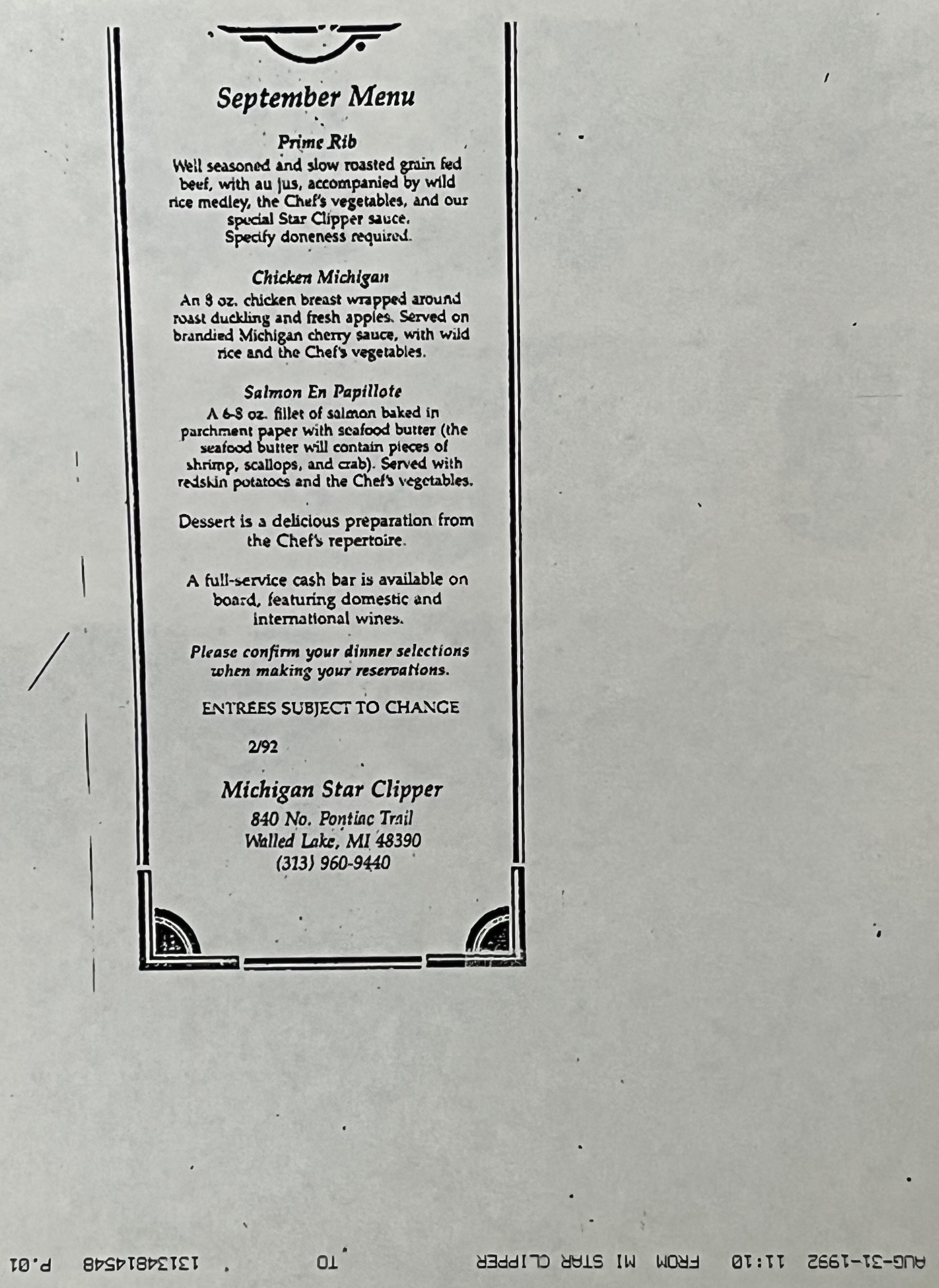
The Michigan Star Clipper Dinner Train Menu, September 1992

Unlike many of the other 22 dinner trains across the country that used catered meals, the Michigan Star Clipper featured live on-board chefs who prepared four and five course meals. An example of what the five course meals included were the Star Clipper's signature prime rib entrée with a grilled shrimp skewer, chicken cordon bleu, or sauteed red snapper as the main entrée. The meals started off with a house salad, and all of the dinners came with bread and the chef's specialty honey butter, fresh brewed coffee, hot tea, and water. The meal also came with a bowl of classic soup or a featured sorbet. The dinner was rounded off with a choice of freshly prepared desserts.

== Cancellation ==
Due to increasingly poor ticket sales, the Star Clipper's owner, railroad industry veteran B. Allen Brown, decided to cease railway operations. The last excursion was made on December 31, 2008. On November 12, 2009, Railmark Holdings, Inc. announced that it sold its Michigan Air-Line Railway Co. to Nebraska-based Browner Turnout Co. Browner Turnout Co. became the fifth owner of the rail line in 123 years.

The rail spur upon which the train used to run has been completely abandoned, with all rails and ties removed and the bed graded June 2012. All rail crossings have been permanently marked "out of service" and the crossing arms where the rail crossed the M-5 road have been removed in June 2013 and on July 18, 2014, the remaining rail that crossed M-5 has been removed and filled with concrete. The rail spur between Haggerty Rd and Telegraph Rd is now made for (Rail-Trail) walking or bike access.
