= Bingham Township =

Bingham Township may refer to:

- Bingham Township, Hancock County, Iowa
- Bingham Township, Clinton County, Michigan
- Bingham Township, Huron County, Michigan
- Bingham Township, Leelanau County, Michigan
- Bingham Township, Orange County, North Carolina, in Orange County, North Carolina
- Bingham Township, Traill County, North Dakota, in Traill County, North Dakota
- Bingham Township, Potter County, Pennsylvania
