= TART Trails =

Trails in Michigan, United States

- Location: Grand Traverse and Leelanau counties, Michigan, U.S.
- Established: 1998
- Use: Walking, running, biking, rollerblading
- Surface: Asphalt, crushed limestone
- Website: traversetrails.org

The Traverse Area Recreation and Transportation Trails (TART Trails) are a system of non-motorized trails in and around Traverse City, Michigan, extending further into Grand Traverse and Leelanau counties. The system was established in 1998.

The senior trail's acronym "TART" pays tribute to one of the best-known agricultural products of the Traverse City area, the tart cherry or pie cherry. For similar reasons, the local airport is called Cherry Capital Airport.

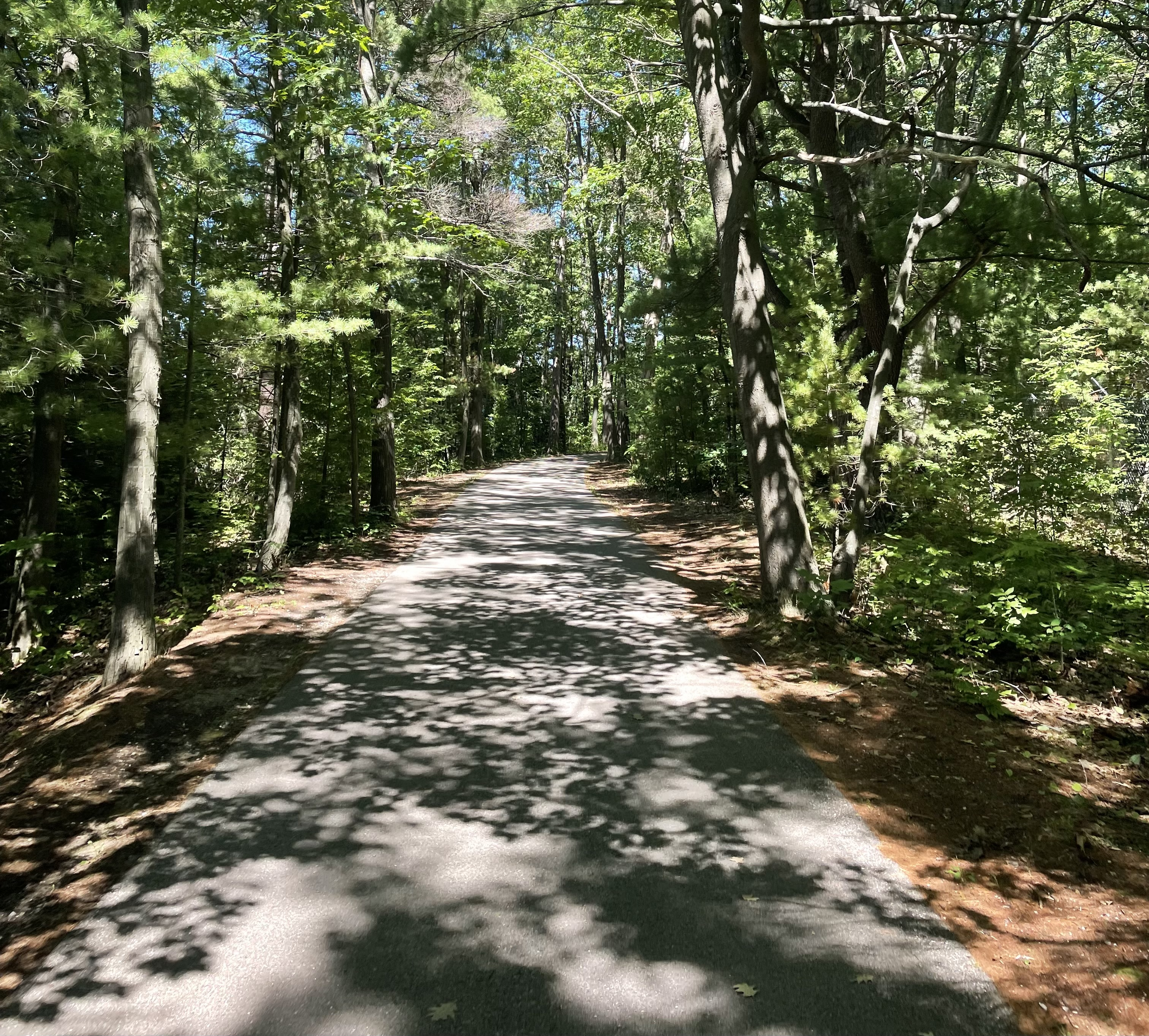
Wood section along the Boardman Lake Trail

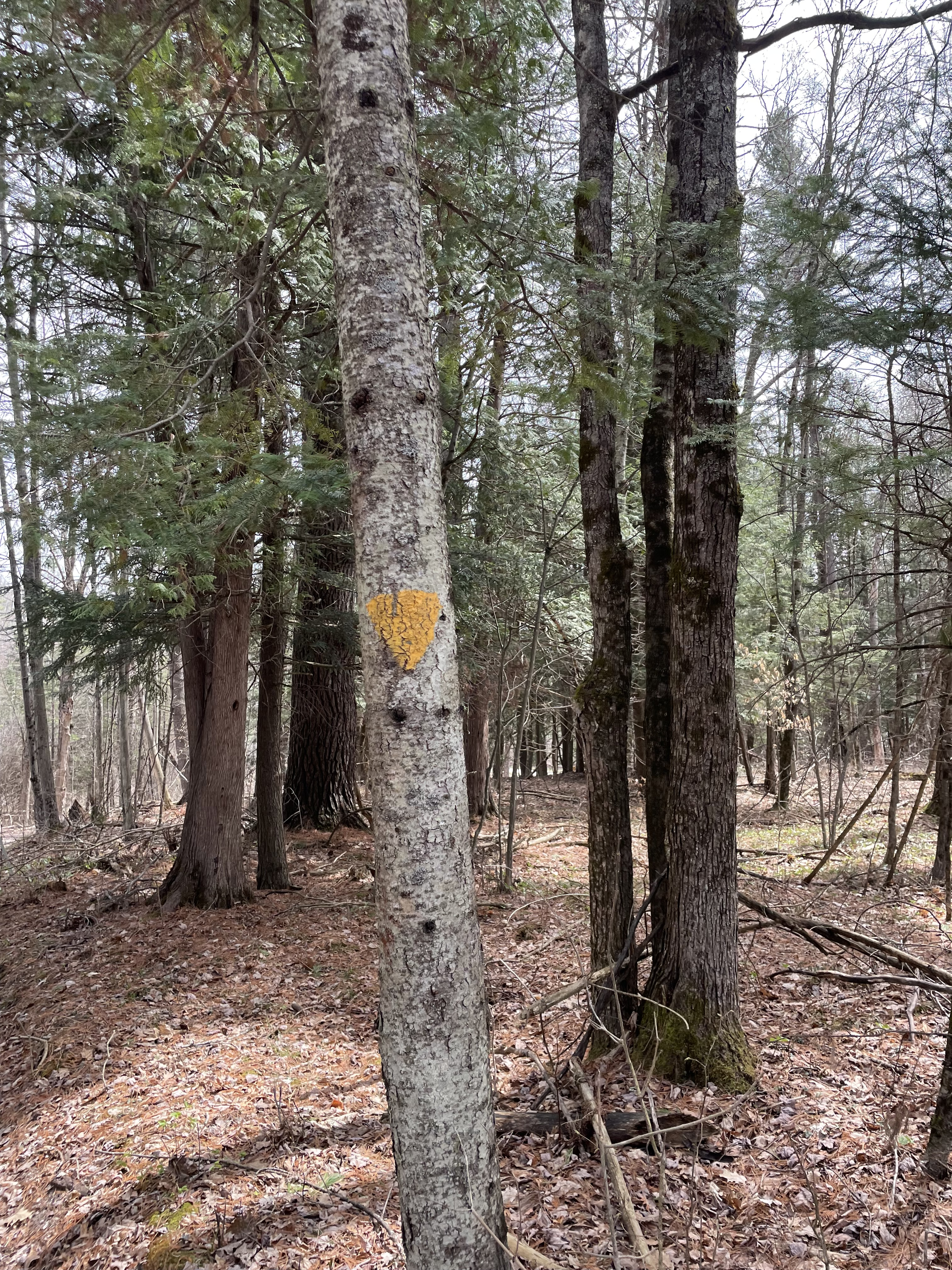
The Boardman/Ottaway River Trail is blazed by yellow markers like this one.

== Component trails ==
=== Boardman Lake Trail ===
The Boardman Lake Trail is a four-mile (6.4 km) loop trail around Boardman Lake. It was established in 2005, and completed in 2022.

=== Boardman/Ottaway River Trail ===
The Boardman/Ottaway River Trail is a 24-mile (39 km) singletrack trail paralleling the Boardman River from Traverse City into the heart of Grand Traverse County.

=== Buffalo Ridge Trail ===
The Buffalo Ridge Trail is a 1.5-mile (2.4 km) trail on Traverse City's west side, in Garfield Township. Completed in 2012, the trail connects the former Traverse City State Hospital and Mall Trail to infrastructure along Silver Lake Road, including a Meijer store, a YMCA, and Traverse City West Middle School.

=== Leelanau Trail ===
The Leelanau Trail is a 17-mile (27 km) rail trail in Leelanau County, connecting Traverse City and Greilickville to Suttons Bay. It was established in 1995, and follows the bed of the former Manistee and North-Eastern Railroad.

=== Mall Trail ===
The Mall Trail is a two-mile (3.2 km) connecting downtown Traverse City with the Grand Traverse Mall. It parallels US 31/M-37 (Division Street) for its entire length.

=== Sleeping Bear Heritage Trail ===
Located within the Sleeping Bear Dunes National Lakeshore in Leelanau County, this trail runs for 20 miles (32 km), paralleling M-22 and M-109. It connects the towns of Empire, Glen Haven, and Glen Arbor. It does not connect to the rest of the TART Trails system.

=== TART in Town ===
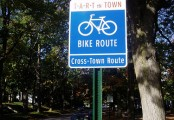
TART in Town sign

The TART in Town is a series of streets in downtown Traverse City deemed safe for bicycle traffic.

=== TART Trail ===
The eponymous TART Trail is a rail trail that runs east–west for 12.3 miles (19.8 km), and was established in 1991. Part of U.S. Bicycle Route 35, it is a paved trail that extends from the west side of Traverse City (M-22) to Acme (M-72). Most, but not all, of the trail follows the 19th-century roadbed of the former Chicago and West Michigan Railway, also paralleling Grand Traverse Bay. The last segment of trail, the so-called "Acme Connector", was completed in 2022. The trail will also eventually feature direct access to the Nakwema Trailway, a trail that will eventually connect Traverse City to Charlevoix and the Little Traverse Wheelway.

=== Three Mile Trail ===
The Three Mile Trail (named for Three Mile Road, which it parallels) is currently a 2-mile (3.2 km) trail, beginning at the TART Trail. An extension of the trail to Hammond Road is set to begin construction in 2024.

=== Vasa Pathway ===
The Vasa Pathway system is a series of unpaved recreational trails east of Traverse City. Component trails include the Vasa Singletrack, Vasa Skillz Loop, Vasa Snowshoe Trail, and Winter Sports Singletrack.

== Recent events ==
As of 2023, the TART Trails system asserts that it is a pioneer in the implementation of a formal maintenance responsibility-sharing system oriented towards the needs of a trail system affected by lake effect snow. The City of Traverse City, local townships, and volunteers coordinate snow removal and cross-country ski grooming. TART Trails believes they are leaders in the wintertime maintenance of a large (100-mile [160 km]) non-motorized trail system in a high-snow area. TART Trails reports that wintertime trail usage has increased 20% since the trail snow removal system was implemented.
