= Saint John's Lutheran Church (Adrian, Michigan) =

Historic church in Michigan, United States

- St. John's Lutheran Church
- U.S. National Register of Historic Places
- Michigan State Historic Site
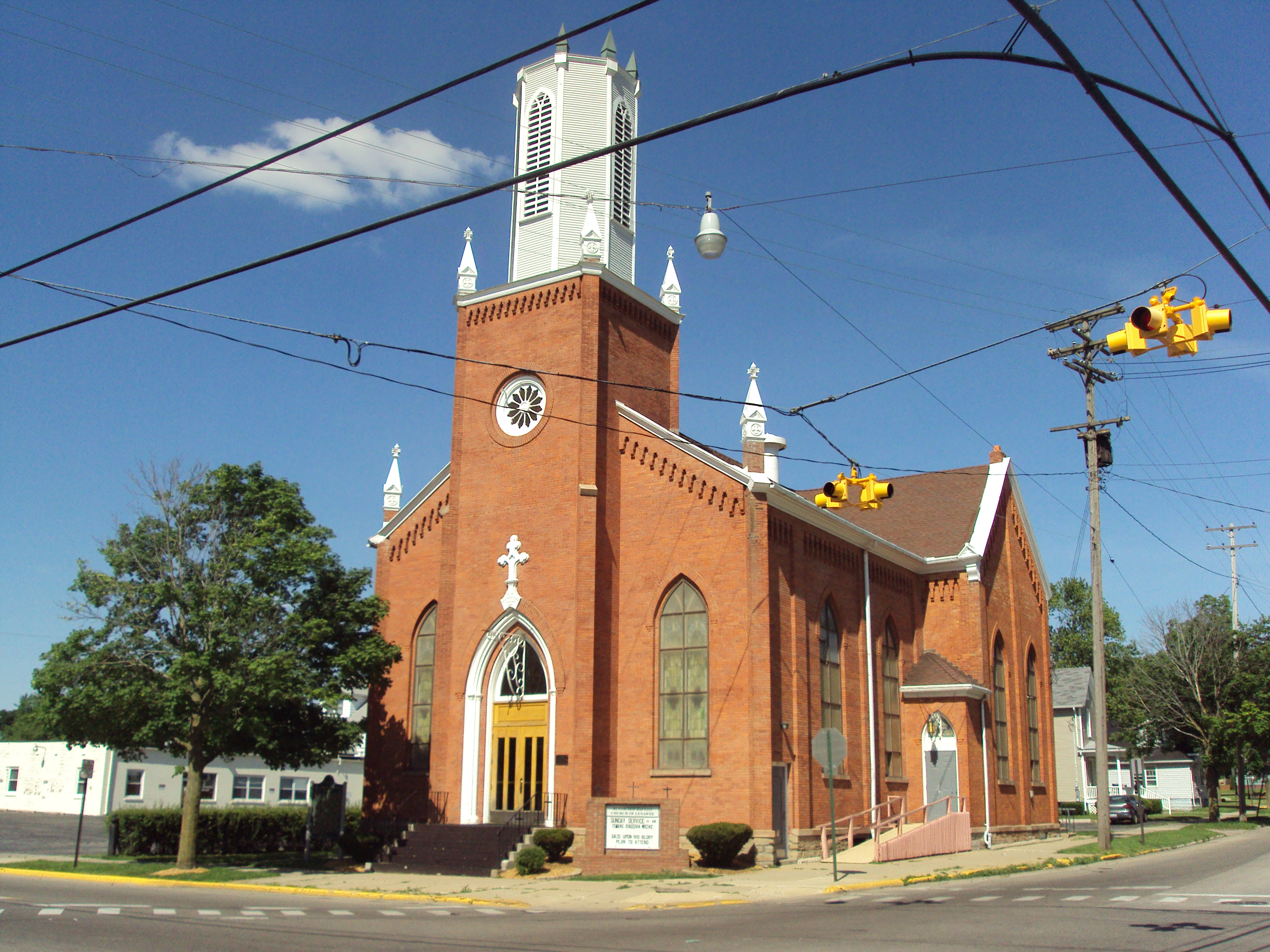

- Location within Michigan Location within the United States
- Interactive map
- Location: 121 South Locust Street; Adrian, Michigan
- Coordinates: 41°53′46″N 84°1′50″W
- Built: 1861
- Architect: Matthes, Kaumeier, Steffan
- Architectural style: Gothic Revival
- NRHP reference No.: 84000544

Significant dates
- Added to NRHP: December 27, 1984
- Designated MSHS: February 23, 1981

Saint John's Lutheran Church is an active church building located at 121 South Locust Street in the city of Adrian in Lenawee County, Michigan. It was designated as a Michigan State Historic State on February 23, 1981, and shortly after listed on the National Register of Historic Places on December 27, 1984. The Lutheran congregation moved to a new home in 2007, and the church building now houses the Reformed Baptist Church of Lenawee.

== History ==
The congregation itself dates back to October 10, 1847, when Reverend Wilhelm Hattstaedt of Monroe, Michigan, organized the "German Evangelical Lutheran Church of Adrian, Michigan." Their first church was completed in 1849, and attendance consisted of a small number of German Episcopalians. The first full-time pastor was Reverend Phillip J. Trautmann, who came to head in 1850. A new church was soon built to serve a growing number of German immigrants in Adrian. The current building was originally constructed in 1861 in the style of Gothic Revival architecture by architects C. F. Matthes, John C. Kaumeier, and Pastor Steffan. The building is notable as one of the oldest surviving thoroughly Gothic Revival Lutheran church buildings in Michigan. It was consecrated on June 29, 1862. The brick structure was originally a modest rectangular building until transepts were added in 1896. The stained glass windows were added in 1914.

The church's congregation continues to serve the Lutheran community of Adrian, but on July 8, 2007, moved to a new location at 3448 North Adrian Highway (M-52), 3.5 miles (5.6 km) north of the old church. The older church building was sold to the Reformed Baptist Church of Lenawee, which began using the church in late 2007 and continues to use it as of 2017.

== Description ==
Saint John's Lutheran Church is a red brick Gothic Revival structure built in a cruciform plan. It sits on a sandstone foundation, and has a low pitched gable roof and partially projecting tower in the front. The main entrance is in the base of the tower, and is through double doors within a recessed arch. The tower is topped with an octagonal belfry. The corners of the church have angled buttresses topped with metal pinnacles, and the side walls are divided into bays by piers.

On the interior, the entry is through a small vestibule in the case of the tower. Stairways lead up to the balcony and down to the full basement, and the auditorium opens off the vestibule. The auditorium is cruciform, with plaster walls and wainscoting made of wide, dark-stained, vertical pine boards. Decorative elements are in the plaster ceiling. Pews face the altar in the apse.
