= Railmark Holdings =

US railway holding company

Railmark Holdings, Inc. is an American rail industry holding company whose subsidiaries provide railroad services in railroad operations, track construction and maintenance, rail freight logistics, rail development, and railroad mechanical services. Railmark Holdings was founded in 1998 by B. Allen Brown, who serves as Railmark's President & CEO. Railmark primarily operates in the United States but has had railroad business experience in eighteen countries outside of the United States.

Railmark’s operations are divided into five business segments: railroad operations, rail logistics, track construction and maintenance, railcar services, and rail development. The current subsidiaries are Railmark Track Works, Rail Freight Solutions, Railmark Transit Services, and Railmark Railcar Services. Railmark Transit Services serves the light rail and regional rail industry. Previous subsidiaries include Michigan Air-Line Railway and Railmark's Rail Entertainment USA.

The Railmark Track Works subsidiary supplies a line of bio-based, biodegradable rail curve and switch plate lubricants. Ultralube brand railroad lubricants are manufactured from renewable US-grown crop-based oils. RAILheat utilizes an environmentally safe and energy-efficient Far Infrared (FIR) technology that is designed to prevent freezing in railroad equipment and operations. These products meet the U.S. Environmental Protection Agency's (EPA) Environmental Preferable Purchasing (EPP) criteria.

Rail Entertainment USA used to run the Star Clipper Dinner Train, Steel Wheels Party Train, and Pullman Palace Bed & Breakfast, along with a scenic railway operation located in Oakland County, Michigan. The Star Clipper Dinner Train is the first and oldest dinner train in the United States, dating back to early 1986. The final run of this train was on December 31, 2008.

On November 12, 2009, the company sold its Michigan Air-Line Railway to Nebraska-based Browner Turnout. In August 2014, Railmark and Train Travel Holdings (TTHX) announced that they will be merging their operations. The merger provided Railmark with greater access to capital as a public company, while TTHX acquired more shareholders who work in the railroad industry.

In January 2017, it was announced that Railmark had acquired Yreka Western Railroad, a railway line operating in Siskiyou County, California.
