= Kiwanis Trail =

Trail in Michigan

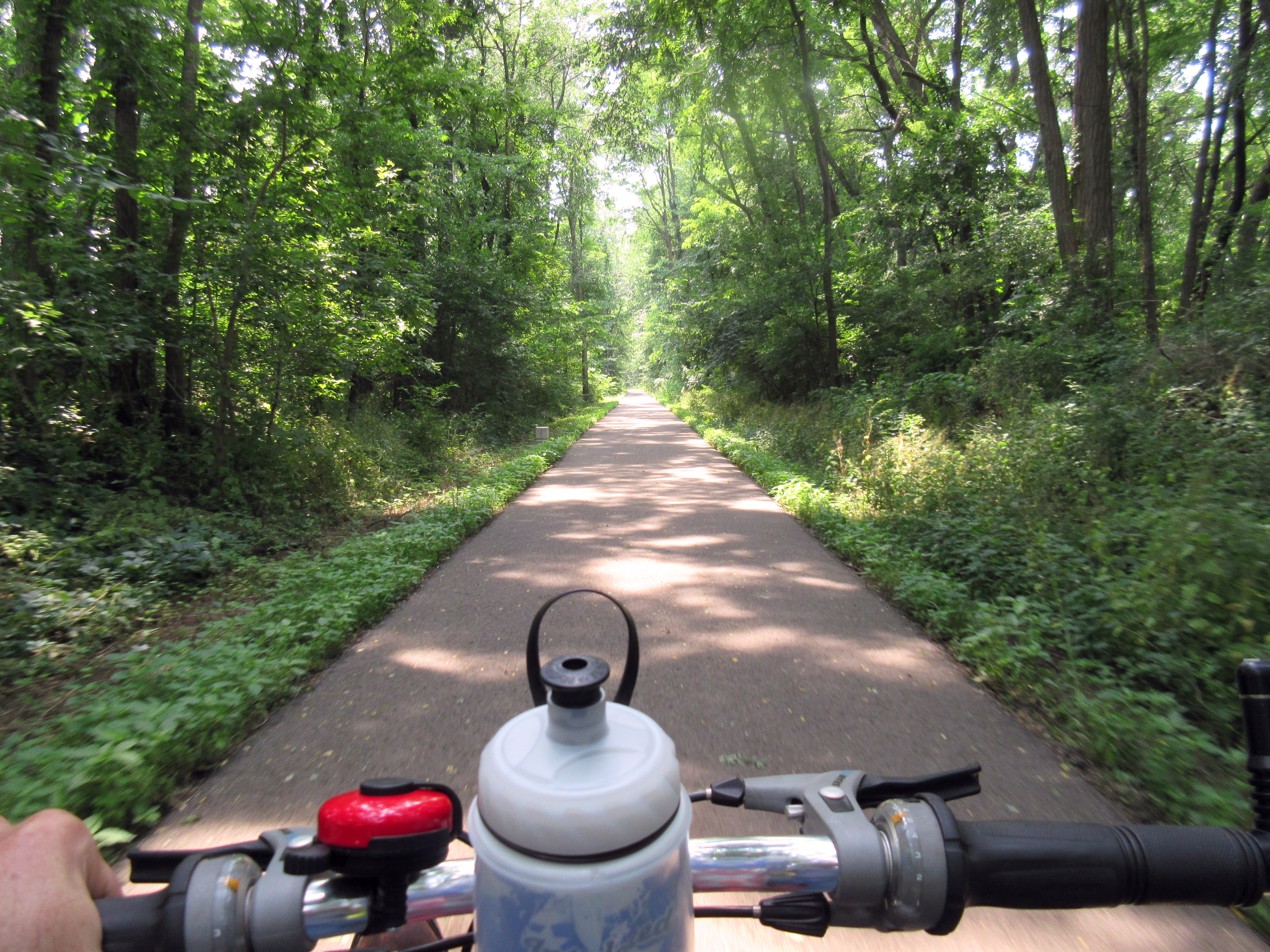

Rails to Trails
- Length: 8 miles
- Location: Adrian to near Tecumseh; Michigan; United States
- Trailheads: Parking in Adrian and north terminus
- Use: Hiking, Bicycling, Inline Skating, Cross Country Skiing
- Grade: mostly flat to gentle railroad grades
- Difficulty: Wheelchair accessible
- Months: 12
- Sights: Covered bridge in Trestle Park; Trestle bridge over Wolf Creek
- Surface: Asphalt, Concrete
- Right of way: DT&I

The Kiwanis Trail is a rail to trail conversion in Adrian, Michigan that roughly follows the River Raisin.

== History ==
old DT&I Railroad map

The trail occupies the old Detroit, Toledo and Ironton Railroad that extended from Ironton, Ohio to Detroit.

The trail forms the first component of a much longer proposed regional greenway trail, the River Raisin Greenway. If completed, it would extend from Adrian to Manchester, Michigan.

== Location ==
The paved trail is maintained by the parks department of in Adrian. It extends northeast and almost reaches the city of Tecumseh.

Crossing	Mileage		Notes	Coordinates
Crossing	(mi)	(km)	Notes	Coordinates
Bus. US 223 / M-52 (S. Adrian Hwy. / S. Main St.)	0	0	Southern Terminus, Adrian	41°53′28″N 84°02′33″W
Riverside Park	0.3	0.48	Bathrooms and parking	41°53′39″N 84°02′47″W
Bus. US 223 (Maumee St.)	0.8	1.3	Busy highway crossing	41°53′58″N 84°02′31″W
Trestle Park	1.1	1.8	Bathrooms and parking	41°54′16″N 84°02′09″W
Bent Oak Ave.	1.7	2.7	Parking	41°54′34″N 84°02′01″W
Trestle bridge	1.8	2.9	Trestle bridge over Wolf Creek that drains Lake Adrian into Raisin River	41°54′34″N 84°02′01″W
W. Valley Rd.	4.2	6.8	Port-a-pot courtesy of St. John's Lutheran Church	41°56′18″N 84°00′25″W
M-52 (N. Adrian Hwy.)	4.4	7.1	Caution, busy highway	41°56′29″N 84°00′17″W
Jct. of Ives Rd. & Green Hwy.	8.1	13.0	Parking, Northern Terminus, 1.5 miles south of Tecumseh	41°58′41″N 83°57′22″W
