= Little Traverse Wheelway =

Trail

- Location within Michigan
- Location: Lower Peninsula, Emmet County, USA
- Nearest city: Charlevoix, Michigan; Petoskey, Michigan; Harbor Springs, Michigan
- Coordinates: 45°19′59″N 85°13′12″W
- Governing body: Charlevoix County Road Commission; Petoskey D.P.W; Emmet County Road Commission
- Length: 26.65 mi (42.89 km)
- Use: Cycling, Hiking, XC skiing
- Difficulty: Intermediate
- Season: All
- Surface: Asphalt

Little Traverse Wheelway is a rail-to-trail bike path and part of U.S Bicycle Route 35 in the state of Michigan. The trail is 26.65 miles (42.89 km) of paved trail which starts in Charlevoix (Waller Road) and ends in Harbor Springs (East Lake Road). The Little Traverse Wheelway will eventually connect to the TART Trail, but for now it connects with North Western State Trail at Spring Lake Park.

Points of interest along the trail include:

- Little Traverse Bay
- Charlevoix (Note: 12 minutes or less from trailhead)
- Nature preserves
- Downtown Petoskey
- Harbor Springs
- Petoskey State Park

== Trailheads ==
County	Location	Parking surface	Amenities	Coordinates
Charlevoix	Shanahan Field (Note: Use local road to access trailhead)	Paved	Downtown Charlevoix, water and picnic tables	45.333697°N 85.231116°W
Charlevoix	MDOT Roadside Park	Paved	Water and picnic tables	45.362400°N 85.175473°W
Charlevoix	Unknown	Dirt	None	45.364164°N 85.170377°W
Emmet	West Park	Dirt	Gas station	45.359763°N 85.096139°W
Emmet	East Park	Paved	Water, covered shelter and picnic tables	45.368949°N 85.003030°W
Emmet	Tannery Creek	Dirt	Shelter, picnic table, grocery store, retail, and restaurants	45.391877°N 84.918407°W
Emmet	Spring Lake Park (Note: Trail access from other side of the road)	Paved	Restrooms, water, and picnic tables	45.393738°N 84.906327°W
Emmet	Little Traverse Township Park	Paved	Picnic tables and First Community Bank	45.427730°N 84.912710°W
Emmet	Bayfront Park (Petoskey)	Paved	Connected to downtown via tunnel	45.376396°N 84.957246°W
Emmet	Kosequat Park (Harbor Springs)	Dirt	Picnic tables	45.434382°N 84.970625°W
