= North Western State Trail =

Rail trail in Michigan, USA

The North Western State Trail is a 32-mile (51 km) rail trail located in Northern Lower Michigan. It starts on the other side of Petoskey connecting to Little Traverse Wheelway and ends at North Central State Trail Mackinaw City. From Petoskey to Alanson the trail is paved for 7.5 miles (12.1 km). From Alanson to Mackinaw City is a mixture of railroad ballast, mixed dirt and stone. The rest of the trail will be improved over time.
