= Little Traverse Conservancy =

Land preservation organization in northern Michigan, United States

- Headquarters: 3264 Powell Road; Harbor Springs, Michigan 49740, USA
- Executive Director: Kieran Fleming
- Website: landtrust.org

Little Traverse Conservancy is a land conservancy based in Harbor Springs, Michigan, in the United States.

It is made up of two Michigan non-profit corporations, Little Traverse Conservancy, Inc., founded in 1972, and Little Traverse Conservancy Conservation Trust, founded in 1990.
