= Michigan Air Line Railway =

Former railroad company in Michigan

Overview
- Dates of operation: 1875–1928
- Predecessor: St. Clair and Chicago Air Line Railroad; Michigan Air Line Railroad
- Successor: Grand Trunk Western Railroad

Technical
- Track gauge: 1,435 mm (4 ft 8 1/2 in)
- Length: 105.9 miles (170.4 km)

The Michigan Air Line Railway was a railroad company in the United States. It was incorporated in 1875 and constructed a line between Richmond, Michigan, and Jackson, Michigan, between 1877 and 1884. It was under the control of the Grand Trunk Railway for most of its existence and merged into the Grand Trunk Western Railroad in 1928. Its line was abandoned in stages between 1975 and 2011.

It is one of three similarly named railroad companies that exist or have existed in the state of Michigan. The Michigan Air Line Railroad (1868–1916) built part of the Michigan Air Line Railway's line but otherwise enjoyed a separate existence. The shortline Michigan Air-Line Railway (2006–2011) operated a small part of the Michigan Air Line Railway's line.

== History ==
The Michigan Air Line Railroad had constructed a 14.2-mile (22.9 km) line between Romeo, Michigan, and Richmond, Michigan, (then called Ridgeway) in 1869. In Richmond, the line connected with the Grand Trunk Railway's line between Port Huron, Michigan, and Detroit. The Michigan Air Line Railroad subsequently leased this line, but not its other properties, to the St. Clair River, Pontiac and Jackson Railroad in 1872. That company was renamed the St. Clair and Chicago Air Line Railroad the same year; no further expansion occurred through 1875.

The Michigan Air Line Railway was incorporated on November 18, 1875, to reorganize the St. Clair and Chicago Air Line Railroad. In 1877, the Grand Trunk Railway took control of the company to prevent a competitor from developing a competing line to Chicago. Beginning in 1879 the company built west toward Jackson, Michigan. It reached Rochester in March 1879, and the Grand Trunk's existing line between Pontiac and Detroit in October 1880. The line reached South Lyon in October 1883 and Jackson on September 1, 1884.

The company was formally merged into the Grand Trunk on November 1, 1928.

== Route ==
Under Grand Trunk Western ownership the line was known as the Jackson Subdivision. The Grand Trunk Western abandoned the line between Jackson and Lakeland in 1975, Lakeland and South Lyon in 1983, and South Lyon and Wixom in 1984. It also sold 9 miles (14 km) between Wixom and Walled Lake to Coe Rail in 1984. It abandoned the remainder of line between 1984 and 1998. The Michigan Air-Line Railway, successor to Coe Rail, abandoned its small section in 2010 and 2011.
