= Leelanau Transit Company =

The Leelanau Transit Company was a short line standard gauge railroad incorporated in 1919 as the successor to the Traverse City, Leelanau, and Manistique Railroad, which was incorporated in 1901 to build a line from Traverse City, Michigan to Northport, Michigan in order to support a carferry service to Manistique on the Upper Peninsula. This line was a project of the Grand Rapids and Indiana Railroad and completed a connection from Northport to the main north-south line at Walton Junction via the Traverse City Rail Road Company; unlike the latter, however, it was never folded into the parent company.

Ferry service began in 1903 but was suspended in 1908 following the foreclosure sale of the line the previous year, never to resume; the railroad was recorganized as the Traverse City, Leelanau and Manistique Railway before assuming its final name in 1919 in another reorganization. The line was leased to the Manistee and North-Eastern Railroad; the lease was transferred to the Chesapeake and Ohio Railway when it absorbed the M&NE in 1955. The line remained active at least in part until the 1975, when the final section from Traverse City to Suttons Bay was abandoned. The line north to Northport was taken up in the 1960s. Passenger service was discontinued in 1948.

An excursion service, the Leelanau Scenic Railway, operated on the former Leelanau Transit right-of-way between Traverse City and Suttons Bay from 1989 to 1995. This service ended when a truck hit and destroyed a bridge causing the land to be sold for the construction of the Leelanau Trail.

Two of the stations built for the line survive at least in part, and the Suttons Bay station, constructed in 1920, is listed on the National Register of Historic Places.
