= Kiwanis Lake =

Lake in Maricopa County, Arizona

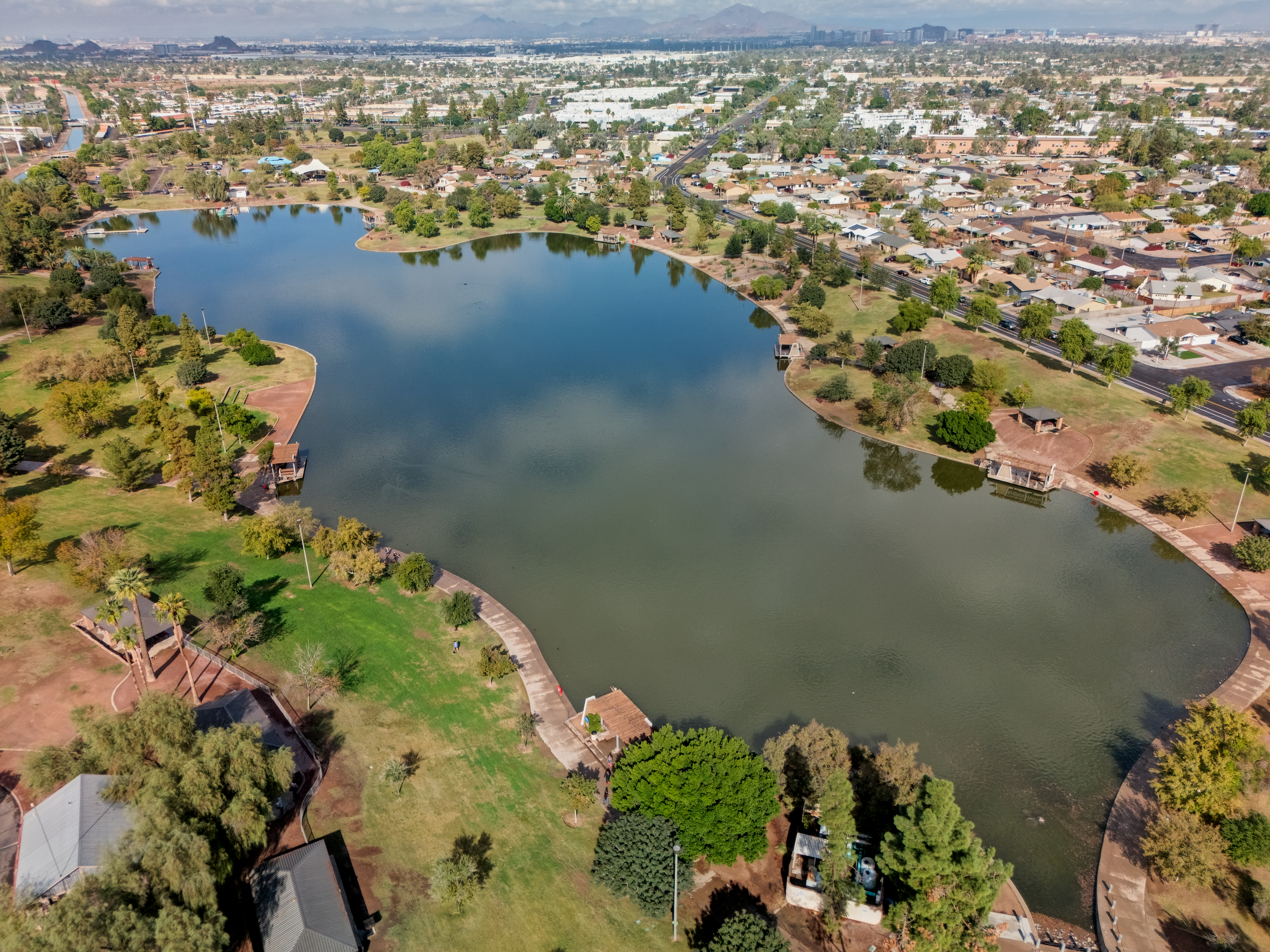
- Southeast aerial view of Kiwanis Lake

- Location within Arizona
- Location: Tempe, Arizona
- Coordinates: 33°22′26.06″N 111°56′20.44″W
- Basin countries: United States
- Surface area: 13 acres (5.3 ha)
- Average depth: 5 ft (1.5 m)
- Surface elevation: 1,100 ft (340 m)
- Settlements: Tempe

Kiwanis Lake is located in Kiwanis Community Park in central Tempe, Arizona, United States, southwest of Baseline Road and Mill Avenue. The surrounding park's amenities include boating, group Ramadas, a playground, sports fields, a recreation center with a wave pool, and seasonal paddleboat rentals

== Fish species ==
- Rainbow trout
- Largemouth bass
- Yellow bass
- Sunfish
- Catfish (channel)
- Catfish (flathead)
- Tilapia
- Carp
