= North Central State Trail =

Rail trail in Michigan, United States

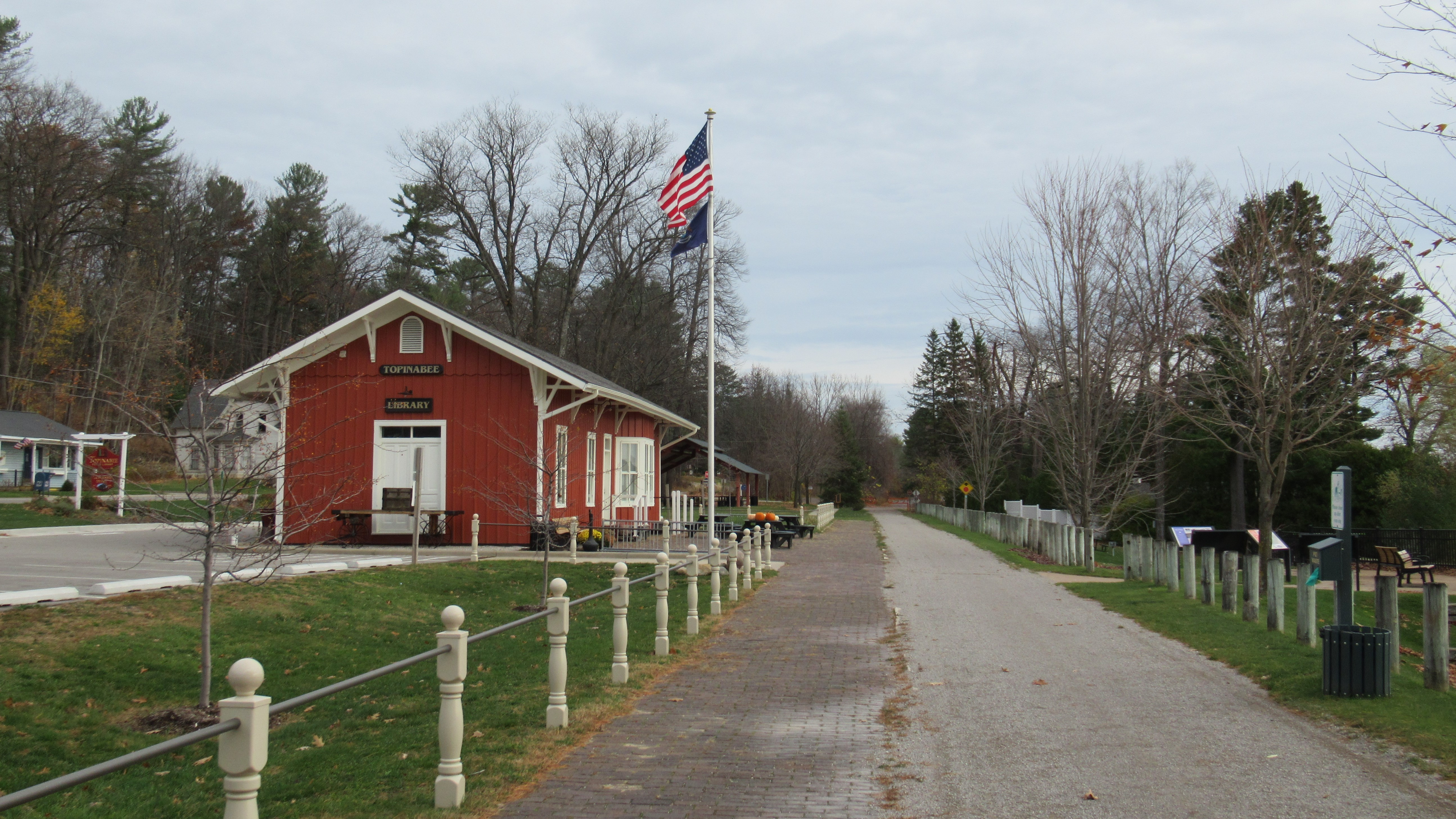
- Trail passing through Topinabee

- Location within Michigan
- Location: Lower Peninsula, Cheboygan County, Otsego County, Michigan USA
- Nearest city: Indian River, Michigan
- Coordinates: 45°24′47″N 84°36′40″W
- Governing body: Michigan Department of Natural Resources
- Length: 74.9 miles (120.5 km)
- Trailheads: Waters, Michigan; Mackinaw City, Michigan
- Use: Cycling, Equestrian, Hiking, Snow-mobiling, XC skiing
- Difficulty: Easy
- Season: All
- Surface: Crushed limestone Asphalt in Gaylord and Mackinaw City
- Website: Official website

The North Central State Trail is a 74.9 mile (120.5 km) recreational rail trail serving a section of the northern quarter of the Lower Peninsula of the U.S. state of Michigan. Following a route generally parallel to Interstate 75, the trail goes northward from the Crawford-Otsego County line south of the community of Waters to the top of the Lower Peninsula at Mackinaw City and connects to the North Western State Trail. It serves the communities of Gaylord, Vanderbilt, Indian River, and Cheboygan which connects to the North Eastern State Trail.

== History ==
The North Central State Trail occupies what was once the northernmost segment of the Michigan Central Railroad. This Detroit-based railway, one of the largest and most profitable in the Lower Peninsula, constructed a land-grant section of trackage northward from its primary service area to Mackinaw City in 1882. This spur line served what was then a booming area of old-growth timberland.

The Michigan Central, which was affiliated with the New York Central Railroad, operated passenger trains on this section of railroad from 1882 until the early 1960s, serving tourist locations within Michigan's Northland. North of Mackinaw City, train passengers and freight transferred onto the railroad car ferries operated by the Mackinac Transportation Company, a joint venture operated by the Michigan Central and two other railroads. On these ferries, railroad service was extended to St. Ignace and onward points on Michigan's Upper Peninsula.

When the Mackinac Bridge was opened in 1957, passengers and freight shifted to automobiles. Trains last operated on a regular basis in the 1980s as a spur line of the Detroit and Mackinac Railway; the right-of-way then ceased to operate as a railroad line and became a trail. The North Central State Trail's northern end in Mackinaw City is close to the docks once operated by the Mackinac Transportation Company.

The Iron Belle Trail cross-state bike trail uses the North Central State Trail as one of its segments.

In 2018–19, the trail was extended southerly from its original terminus at Gaylord to the Crawford-Otsego County line, 1.6 miles (2.6 km) south of the community of Waters, a total of 12.0 miles (19.3 km). Extension of the trail was accomplished through a $200,000 grant to Otsego County from the Michigan Department of Natural Resources.

== Assets ==
The North Central State Trail borders a substantial section of the shoreline of Michigan's Mullett Lake. It also borders the Cheboygan River. The trail also passes directly past Dousman's Mill (formerly Historic Mill Creek State Park) located 5 miles (8 km) southeast of Mackinaw City and Otsego Lake State Park 7 miles (11 km) south of Gaylord, and passes through the undeveloped Gete Mino Mshkiigan State Park south of Topinabee on Mullett Lake.

== Access points ==
Location	Services	Distance (approx.)	Coordinates
South terminus	none		44°51′29″N 84°42′23″W
Waters, Michigan	Parking, Restroom, Water	1.6 miles (2.6 km)	44°52′40″N 84°41′59″W
Gaylord, Michigan	Parking, Restroom	10.4 miles (16.7 km)	45°02′18″N 84°40′46″W
Vanderbilt, Michigan	Parking, Restroom	8.4 miles (13.5 km)	45°08′43″N 84°39′42″W
Wolverine, Michigan	Parking, Restroom	10.8 miles (17.4 km)	45°16′22″N 84°36′08″W
Indian River, Michigan	Parking, Restroom	10.0 miles (16.1 km)	45°24′47″N 84°36′40″W
Topinabee, Michigan	Parking, Restroom	5.4 miles (8.7 km)	45°29′03″N 84°35′30″W
Mullett Lake, Michigan	Restroom	6.6 miles (10.6 km)	45°33′44″N 84°31′30″W
Cheboygan, Michigan	Parking, Restroom	5.4 miles (8.7 km)	45°38′09″N 84°29′14″W
Mackinaw City, Michigan	Parking, Restroom	16.3 miles (26.2 km)	45°46′49″N 84°43′51″W
