= Iron Belle Trail =

Trails in Michigan

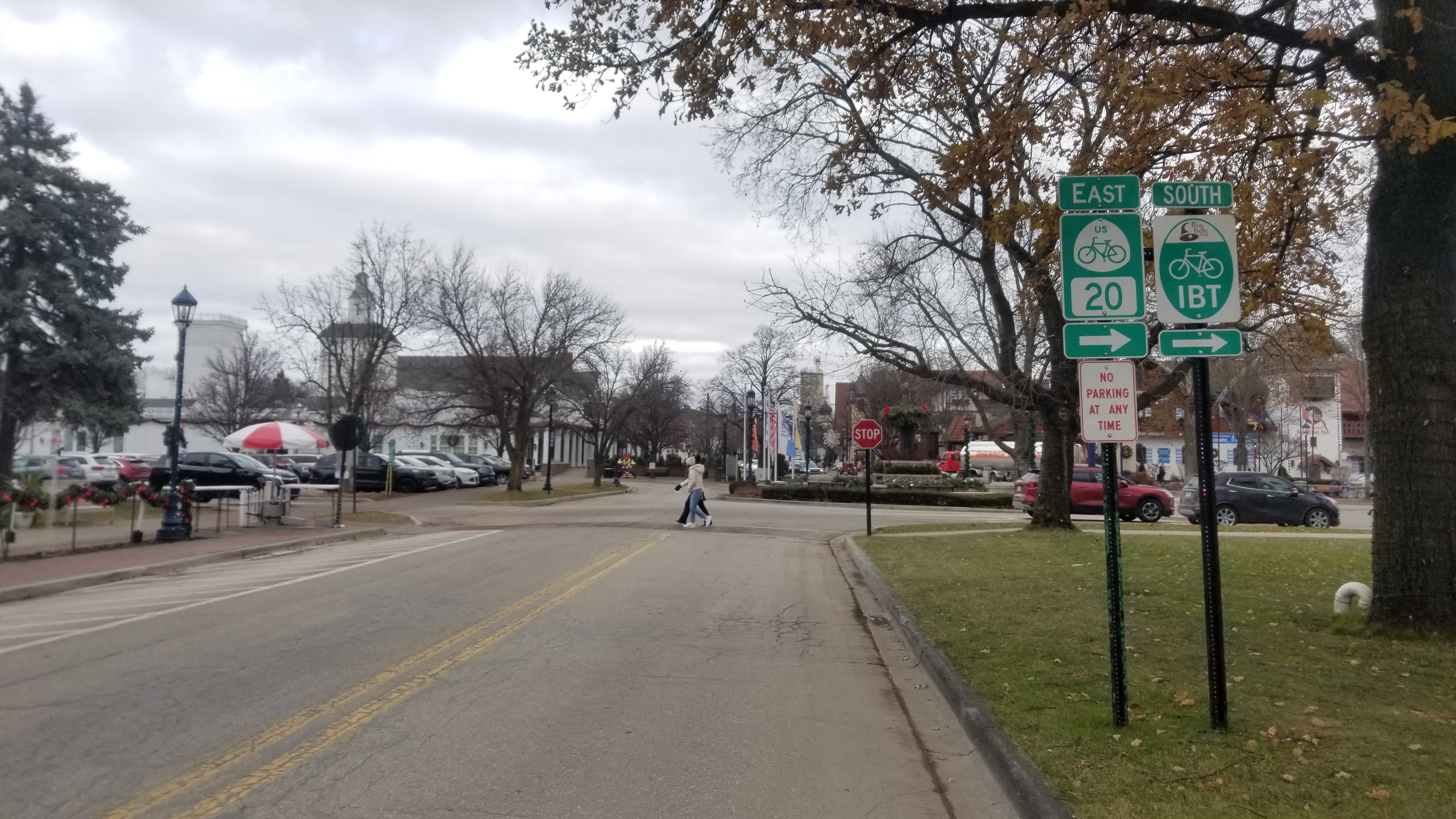
- The trail running along USBR 20 in Frankenmuth
- Length: 1,204 miles (hiking); 828 miles (biking)
- Location: Michigan
- Trailheads: North: Ironwood; South: Belle Isle
- Use: Hiking/Biking
- Website: www.michigan.gov/dnr/places/state-trails/iron-belle

The Iron Belle Trail is a set of two trails that will span the state of Michigan. The two trails, one for hiking and one for biking, connects Ironwood in the Upper Peninsula and Belle Isle State Park in Detroit. When complete, the hiking trail will be 1,204 miles (1,938 km) long and the biking trail is 828 miles (1,333 km) long. The Michigan Department of Natural Resources is coordinating the planning and construction of the missing trail segments.

It is "the longest state-designated trail in the nation." In its more than 2,000 miles (3,200 km) it crosses 48 counties and 240 townships.

== Routes ==
The hiking trail primarily follows the Michigan segment of the North Country National Scenic Trail with connectors to Belle Isle and Ironwood.

The biking trail connects existing trail such as the Paint Creek Trail in Oakland County, the North Central State Trail between Gaylord and Mackinaw City, and U.S. Bicycle Route 10 in the Upper Peninsula parallel to new trail. The bicycle route is 63% complete as of January, 2019, will incorporate routes along U.S. Highway 2 across the Upper Peninsula, and will have a length of 828 miles (1,333 km). The total trail is approximately 70 percent connected.
