= West Bloomfield Trail =

Coordinates: 42.5793°N 83.3598°W

The West Bloomfield Trail is a 6.8-mile-long rail trail in Oakland County, Michigan. It links the Michigan Air Line Trail to the west and the Clinton River Trail to the east, and is a segment of the Great Lake to Lake Trail Route 1. From west to east, the trail is within the communities of West Bloomfield Township and Keego Harbor.

== History ==
The trail was built on the route of the former Michigan Air Line Railway, which built the Pontiac to Jackson segment in 1884. Ultimately, the railroad came under control of Grand Trunk Western. They abandoned the line in 1984. The Michigan Natural Resources Trust Fund purchased the right-of-way, and with support from the Rails to Trails Conservancy, West Bloomfield Parks and Recreation Commission purchased the trail in 1988 and developed it.
