= Macomb Orchard Trail =

Trail in Macomb County, Michigan, USA

Coordinates: 42.8118°N 82.9923°W

- Length: 23.7 mi
- Location: Macomb County, Michigan
- Use: Hiking, bicycling, roller blading, and cross country skiing
- Surface: Asphalt, gravel

The Macomb Orchard Trail is a 23.5 mile long rail trail in Macomb County, Michigan, United States. It is built on the right-of-way of an early Michigan railroad, the Michigan Air Line Railway, later owned and operated by Canadian National Railway. The trail stretches from Richmond to Dequindre Road, where it connects to the Clinton River Trail.

The Macomb Orchard Trail is owned and maintained by Macomb County.
