= Michigan Air Line Railroad =

US railroad company (1868–1916)

Overview
- Dates of operation: 1868–1916
- Predecessor: Grand Trunk Railway of Michigan; Grand Trunk Railway of Northern Indiana
- Successor: Michigan Central Railroad

Technical
- Track gauge: 1,435 mm (4 ft 8 1/2 in)
- Length: 115.25 miles (185.48 km)

The Michigan Air Line Railroad was a railroad company in the United States. It was incorporated in 1868 and constructed a line between Jackson, Michigan, and South Bend, Indiana. The Michigan Central Railroad leased the company in 1871 and merged it in 1916. The New York Central Railroad leased the Michigan Central in 1930. The Michigan Air Line Railroad also built a short line between Romeo, Michigan, and Richmond, Michigan, which became part of the Michigan Air Line Railway, a predecessor of the Grand Trunk Western Railroad.

== History ==
The Grand Trunk Railway of Michigan and Grand Trunk Railway of Northern Indiana were chartered in their respective states in 1867 and 1868, as part of a scheme to build a new railway line between Richmond, Michigan, and Chicago. The two companies were consolidated on July 2, 1868, to form the Michigan Air Line Railroad. The new company constructed a 14.2-mile (22.9 km) line between Romeo, Michigan, and Richmond, Michigan, (then called Ridgeway) in 1869. Afterward, possibly with the encouragement of the Michigan Central Railroad, the company began building a line between Jackson, Michigan, and South Bend, Indiana. At the same time, the backers of the Michigan Air Line Railroad founded another company with the same name in Illinois. This company was consolidated with the Chicago and Canada Southern Railway in 1871.

The company completed the first 24 miles (39 km) between Jackson and Homer, Michigan, in the summer of 1870. In the fall of 1870 the line reached Three Rivers, Michigan. In February 1871 it was completed to Niles, Michigan, at which point the Michigan Central Railroad leased the company. The branch to South Bend opened in 1872, using the route and franchise of the St. Joseph Valley Railroad, merged in 1870.

The Michigan Air Line leased the Romeo–Richmond line to the St. Clair River, Pontiac and Jackson Railroad in 1872; this line subsequently became the basis of the Michigan Air Line Railway, a predecessor of the Grand Trunk Western Railroad. In 1916 the Michigan Air Line Railroad merged with the Michigan Central and ceased to exist as an independent company.

== Route ==
Under the Michigan Central/New York Central ownership the line between Jackson and Niles was known as the Air Line branch, while the line from Niles to South Bend was known as the South Bend branch. Both lines have been abandoned.
