= Leelanau Trail =

Leelanau trail
- Location within Michigan
- Location: Lower Peninsula, Leelanau County, Michigan, US
- Nearest city: Traverse City, Michigan; Suttons Bay, Michigan
- Coordinates: 44°46′31″N 85°38′31″W
- Established: 1995
- Governing body: Leelanau County Road Commission
- Length: 17 mi (27 km)
- Trailheads: Traverse City, Michigan; Suttons Bay, Michigan
- Use: Cycling, Hiking, XC skiing
- Difficulty: Intermediate/Hills
- Season: All
- Surface: Paved
- Website: https://traversetrails.org/trails/leelanau-trail/

The Leelanau Trail is part of U.S. Bicycle Route 35, but also an all paved non-motorized recreational rail trail of 17-mile (27 km) in length that extends from the west side of Traverse City, Michigan to Suttons Bay, Michigan.

This trail passes through the eastern side of Leelanau County, a fast-growing section of the Traverse City metropolitan area. Most, but not all, of the trail follows early 20th-century roadbeds of the former Manistee and North-Eastern Railroad and Traverse City, Leelanau and Manistique, later reorganized as the Leelanau Transit Company.

The Leelanau Trails Association purchased most of the 15-mile (24 km) trail right-of-way in 1995. Prior to this purchase, the railbed had been operated as Leelanau Scenic Railway. In 2004, the Leelanau Trail was connected to the TART Trail at the junction of M-22 and M-72 on the northwest edge of Traverse City. The trail will be part of the Grand Traverse Edible Trails project. The idea of an edible forest is that people can pick fruit from vines and or orchards while on the trail; however, this project will take time to become a full-fledged forest.

The Leelanau Trail passes through a key segment of the Leelanau Peninsula AVA, part of the Michigan wine country. Riesling grapes are grown here.

Points of interest along the trail include:

- Beaches
- Downtown Suttons Bay
- Wineries
- Regional Transportation (Bay.Area.Transportation.Authority)
- Bike shop (Suttons Bay)
- DeYoung Nature Area on Cedar Lake

== Trail heads ==
Suttons Bay, Michigan	Parking surface	Amenities:Near trail	Coordinates
4th St.	Paved	Banks, Restaurant, Public transit and Local medical clinic	44.970860°N 85.651171°W

Leelanau County, Michigan	Parking surface	Amenities:Near trail	Coordinates
Fouch Rd	Dirt	None	44.826346°N 85.682217°W
DeYoung Natural Area	Dirt	Restroom(Summer)	44.809569°N 85.653500°W
Cherry Bend Rd.	Paved	Party store and Restaurants	44.793509°N 85.645568°W

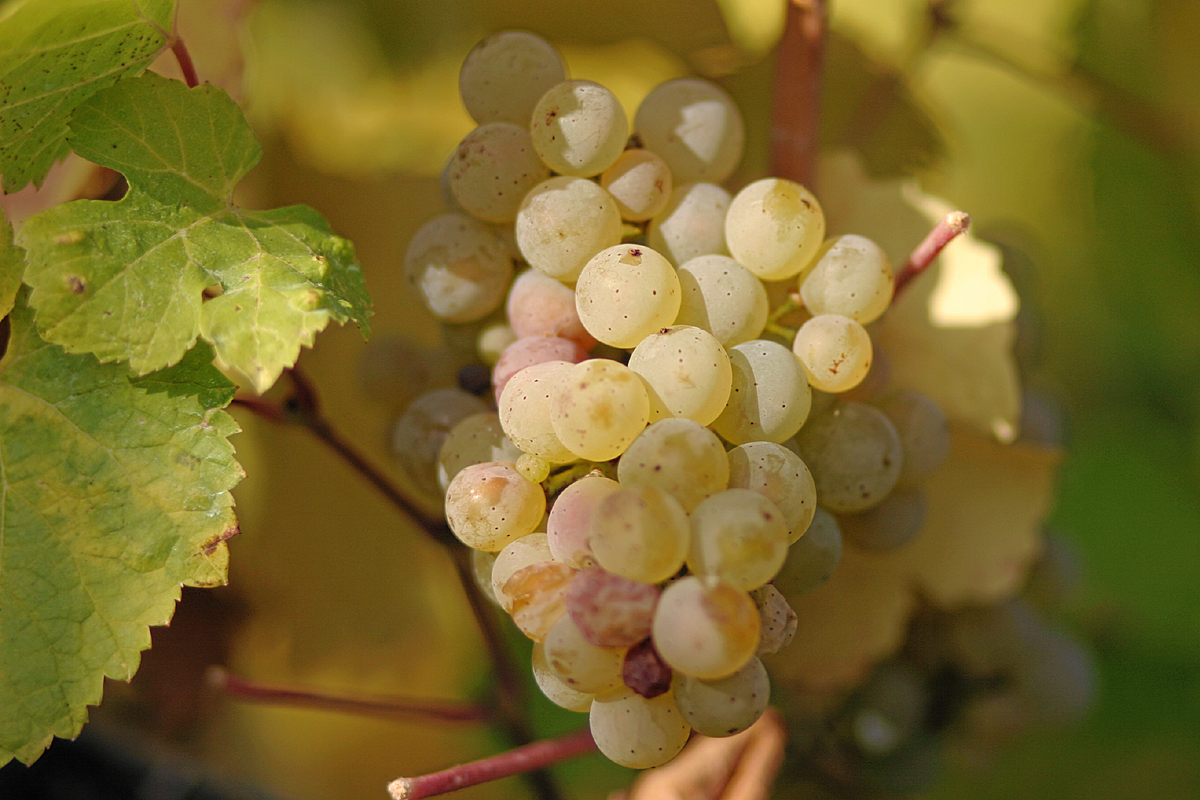
Riesling grapes
