= Manistee and North-Eastern Railroad =

Overview
- Reporting mark: M&NE
- Locale: Michigan
- Dates of operation: 1887–1955
- Successor: Chesapeake and Ohio Railway

Technical
- Track gauge: 4 ft 8 1/2 in (1,435 mm) standard gauge

The Manistee and North-Eastern Railroad (reporting mark M&NE) was a short, standard-gauge line in the U.S. state of Michigan. Organized in 1887, it served several counties in the northwestern quarter of Michigan's Lower Peninsula in the late 19th and early 20th centuries. The railroad's main line stretched from Manistee to Traverse City, with a spur line to Northport leased from the Leelanau Transit Company. The M & NE was originally built to help exploit the old-growth timber resources of its service area. Logs were carried to mills in Manistee. The railroad also attempted to develop a sideline as a hauler of potatoes, orchard fruit, and grain.

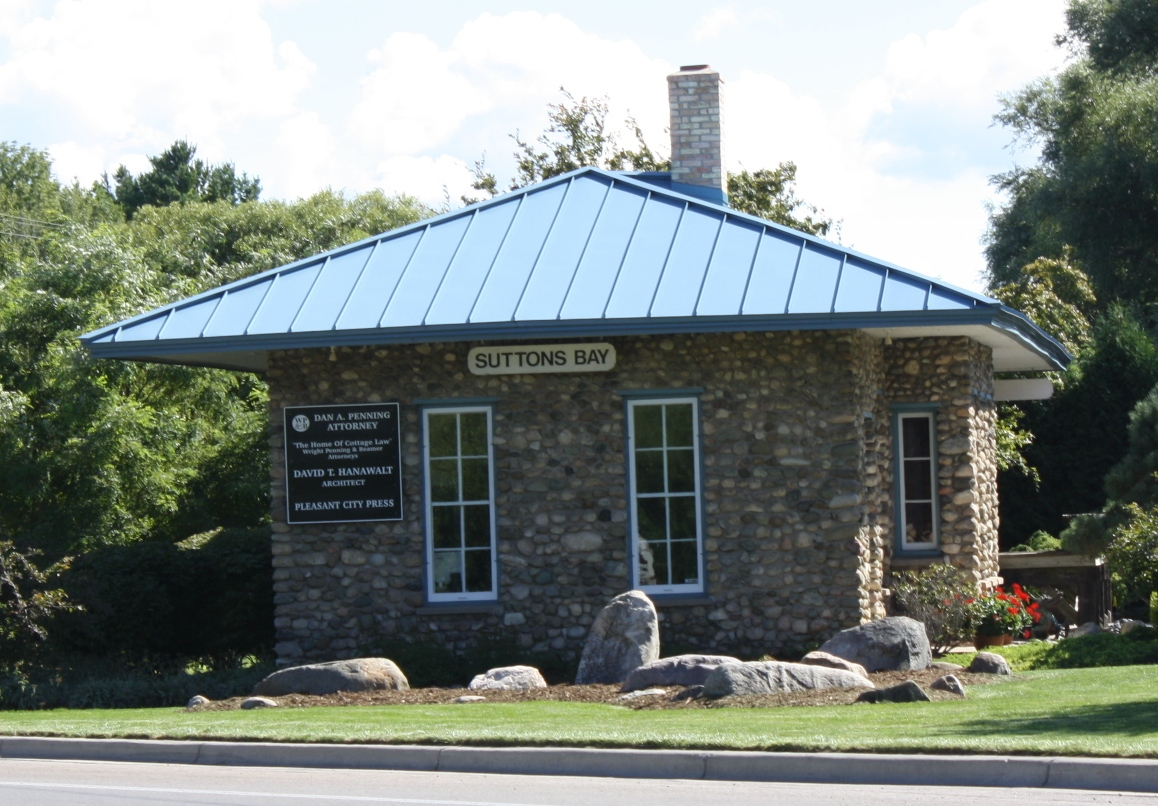
Depot used by Manistee and North-Eastern at Suttons Bay

== Today ==
The Manistee and North-Eastern was consolidated into the Chesapeake and Ohio Railway in 1955. A section of the short railroad's right-of-way is now in use as the Leelanau Trail.
