= Downtown Holly Commercial District =

- U.S. National Register of Historic Places
- U.S. Historic district
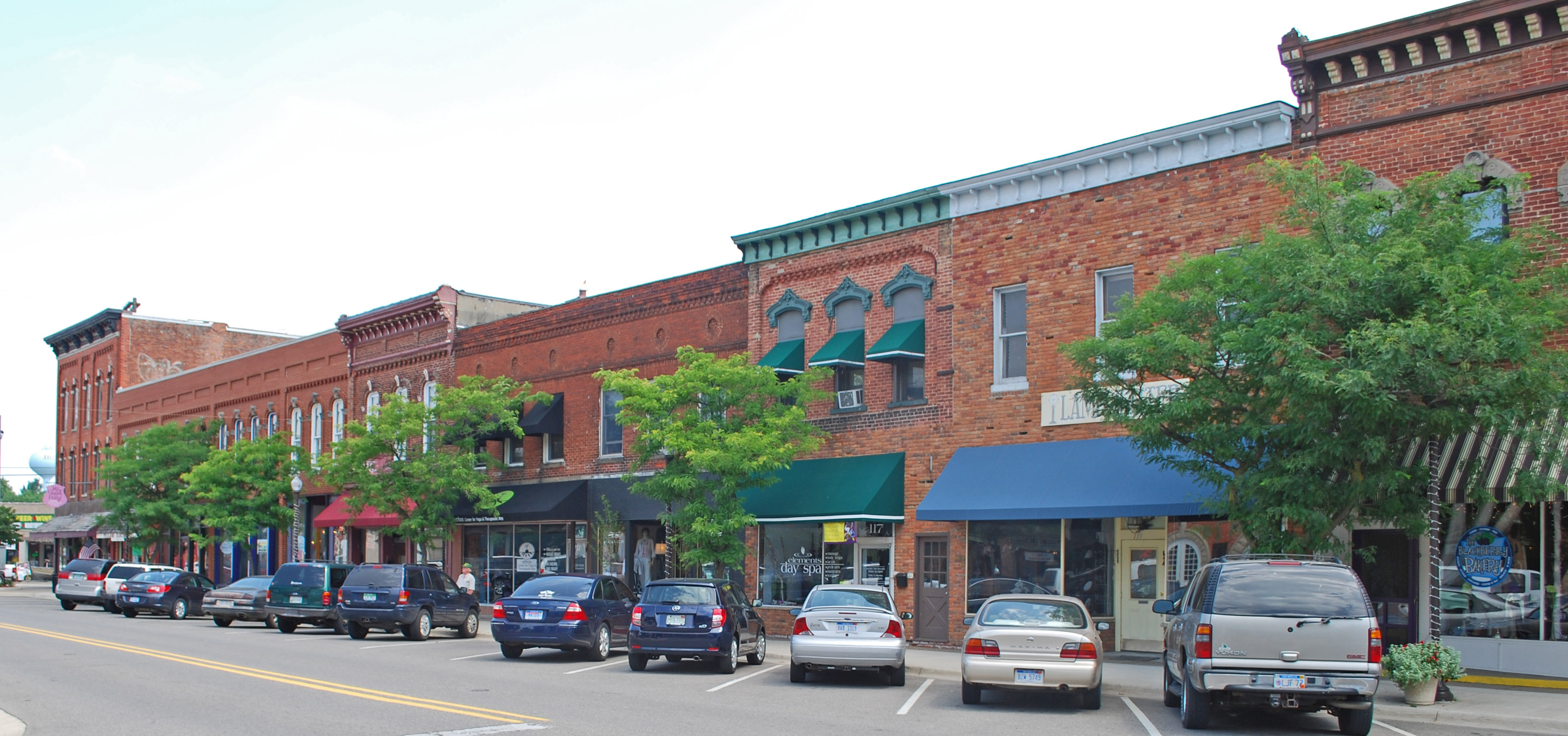
- East side of Saginaw Street, at Battle Alley
- Interactive map
- Location: Roughly bounded by Maple St., S. Broad St., Grand Trunk RR, and First St., Holly, Michigan
- Coordinates: 42°47′32″N 83°37′38″W
- Area: 5 acres (2.0 ha)
- Built: 1870
- Architectural style: Classical Revival, Late Victorian
- NRHP reference No.: 86000866
- Added to NRHP: April 25, 1986

The Downtown Holly Commercial District is a commercial historic district located primarily South Saginaw Street and Battle Alley in Holly, Michigan. The district is roughly bounded by Maple Street, South Broad Street, First Street, and the Grand Trunk Railroad tracks. It was listed on the National Register of Historic Places in 1986.

== History ==
Ira C. Alger built a grist mill along the Shiawassee River in 1843–44, establishing the town of Holly. In 1855 the Detroit and Milwaukee Railroad built a line through the area, followed in 1864 by the Flint and Holly Railroad. The railroads brought growth, as in the five years after the Civil War, the population tripled. The depot on Broad Street became the center of activity, and commercial activity quickly spread along Saginaw Street and Battle Alley.

In 1875, a devastating fire destroyed many of the frame buildings along Saginaw, and they were quickly replaced with brick buildings. The town continued to prosper through the rest of the nineteenth century. However, with the advent of the automobile, growth slowed. In the downtown district, the last major construction projects occurred in the late 1910s and early 1920s. In the subsequent decades, many of the buildings fell into disrepair, and some were demolished. However, in the early 1970s, renovations began, and a number of the historic structures were refurbished.

== Description ==
The Downtown Holly Commercial District is a two-block-long L-shaped district, covering 5 acres and containing 23 structures. The structures are one to three stories high, made of brick, stone, and wood. They are primarily commercial buildings constructed in the late nineteenth and early twentieth century, with architectural styles ranging from Italianate to Neo-Classical, Richardsonian Romanesque, and Queen Anne. Buildings aling the one-lane Battle Alley tend to be relatively small in scale, contrasting to the larger structures located on Saginaw.

The most significant buildings in the district are:

- Wilson Block (127-127 S. Saginaw Street): This two-story brick Italianate was constructed in 1877 after the 1875 fire for Wilson's Cyclone Fence Co. and C.A. Wilson's Drugs. It faces onto bot Saginaw Street and Battle Alley, and is distinguished by the retention of cornices on both facades and by etched designs in the keystones of the second story lintels.
- Commercial Building (117 S. Saginaw Street): This two-story, predominantly brick block was constructed in 1891 for C.E. Lockwood's furniture store. It is significant for the stone elliptical arch and elliptical fanlights on the second story.
- Holly Town Hall (102 Front Street): This 2-1/2 story brick Queen Anne building was constructed in 1890, and is Holly's first dedicated town hall. The ground level contains garages for a fire station; above is a turret that is visually similar to that on the Holly Hotel.
- Old Citizens Bank (109 Battle Alley): This small, one-story Neo-Classical brick and stone building was constructed in 1902, and originally housed a bank.
- Holly Hotel (202 S. Front Street): This two-and-one-half story building was constructed in 1891. A major landmark, it survives two fires, the latest of which, in 1978, spurred a concerted rehabilitation effort. The corner of the building contains a distinctive three-story tower. It is separately listed on the National Register of Historic Places.

== Gallery ==
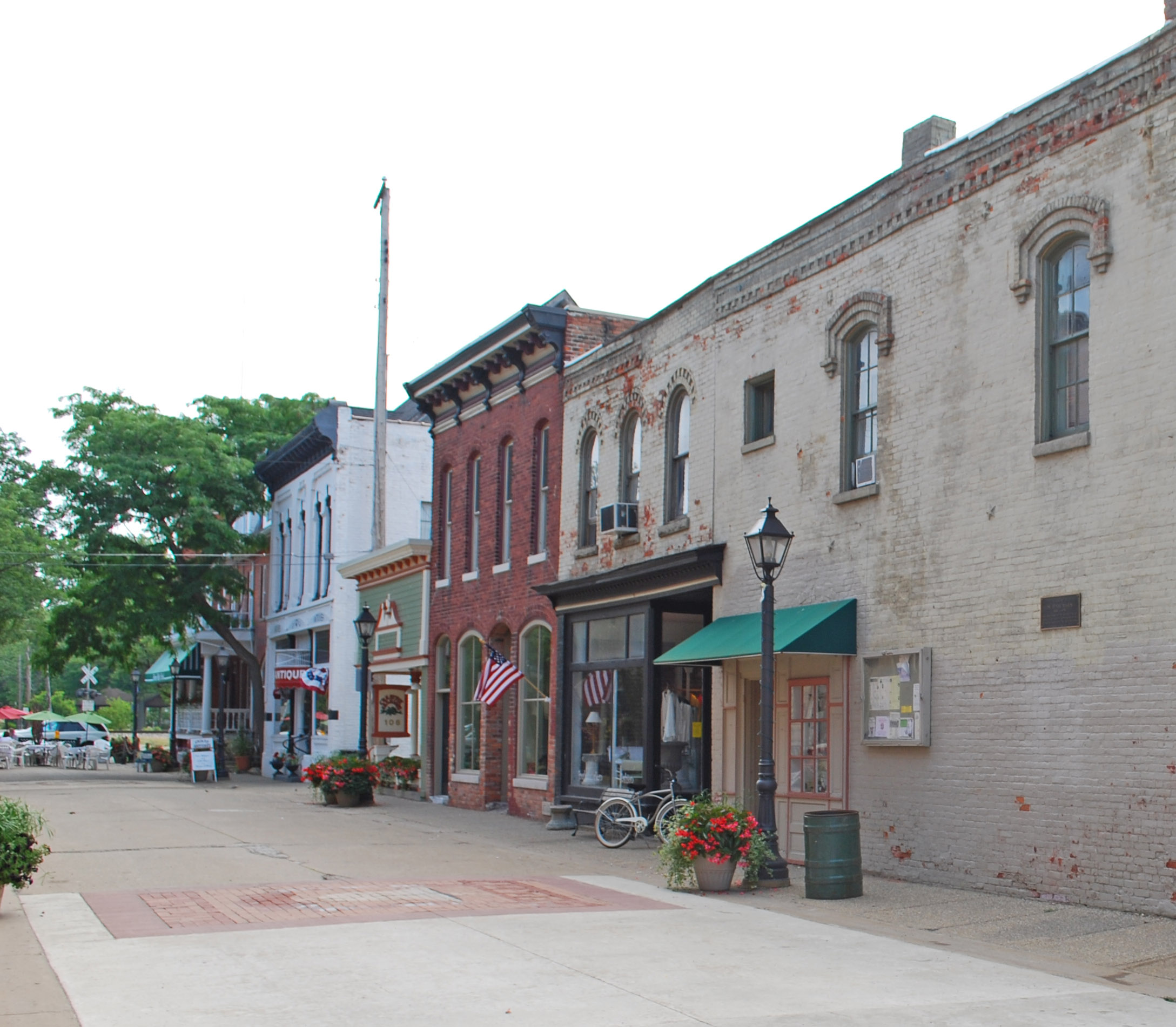
South side of Battle Alley, at Saginaw

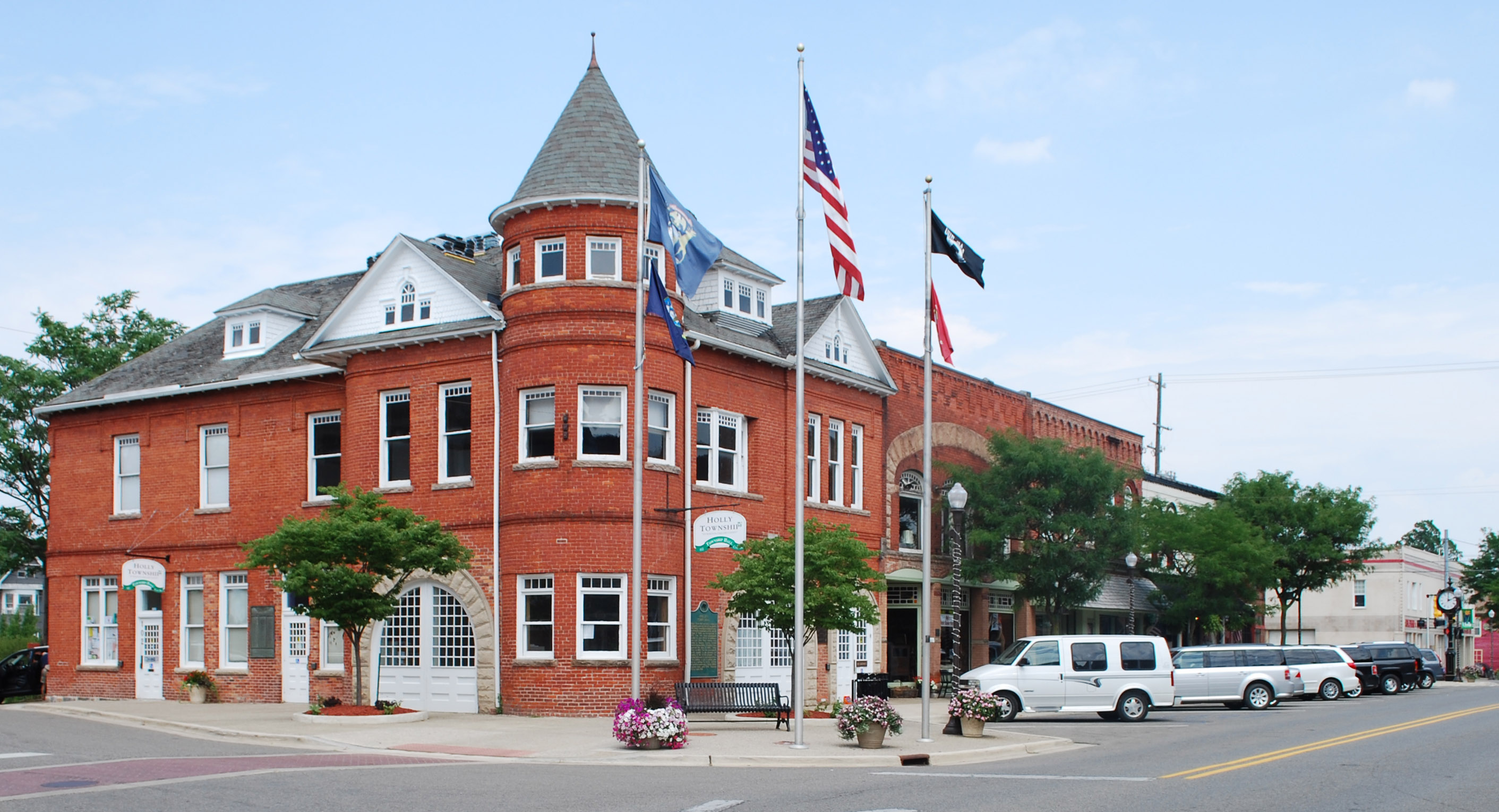
Holly Town Hall

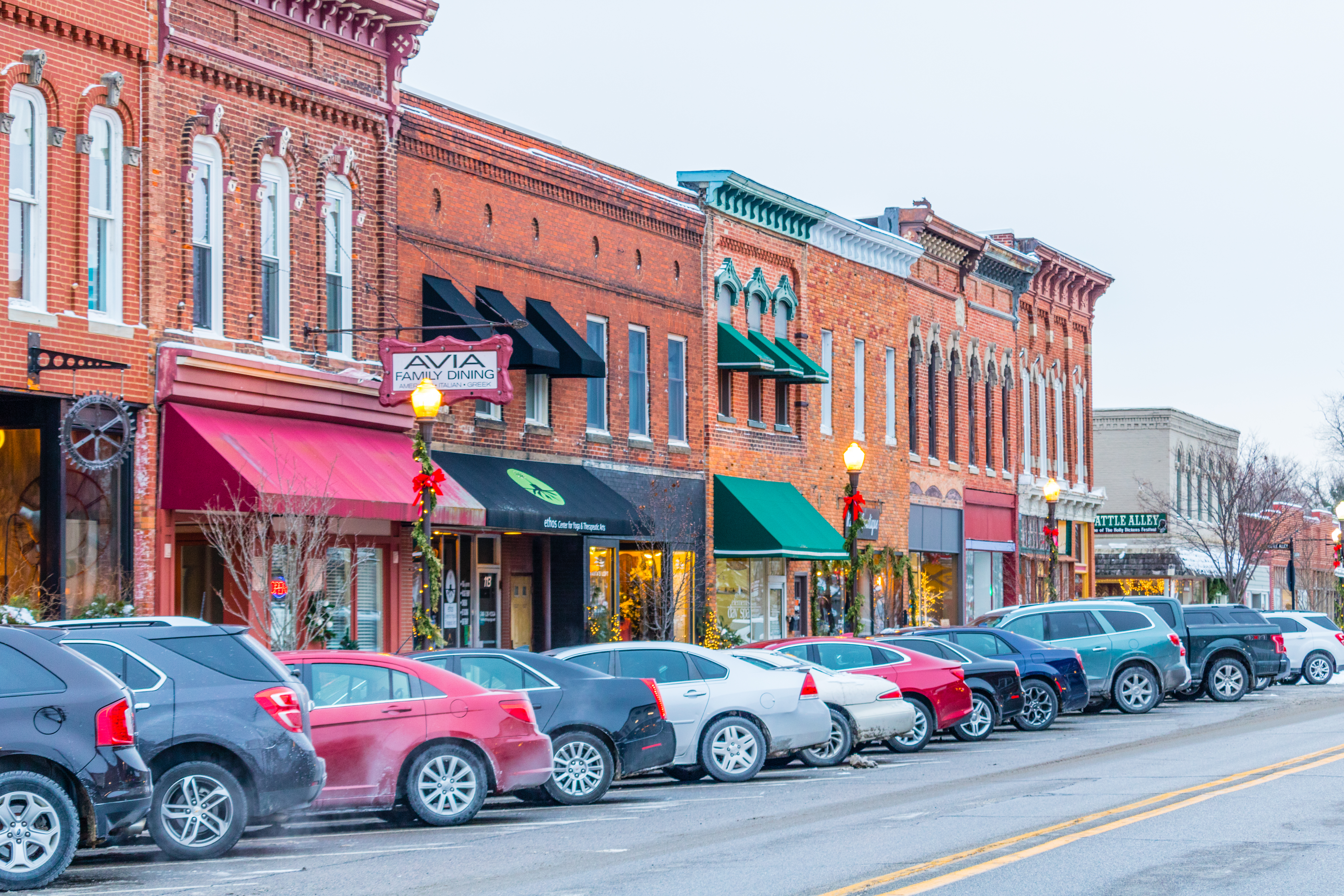
East side of Saginaw Street

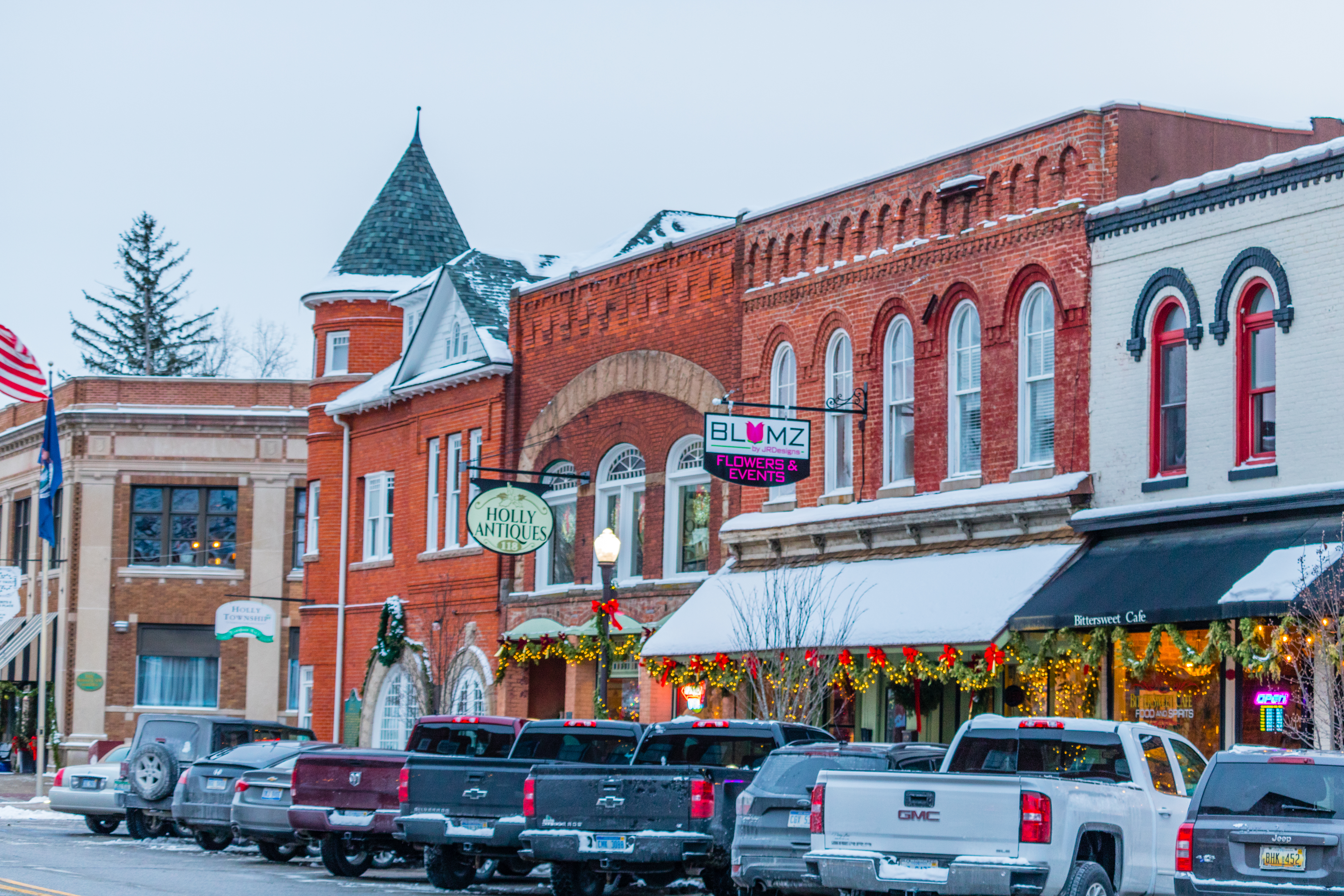
West side of Saginaw Street

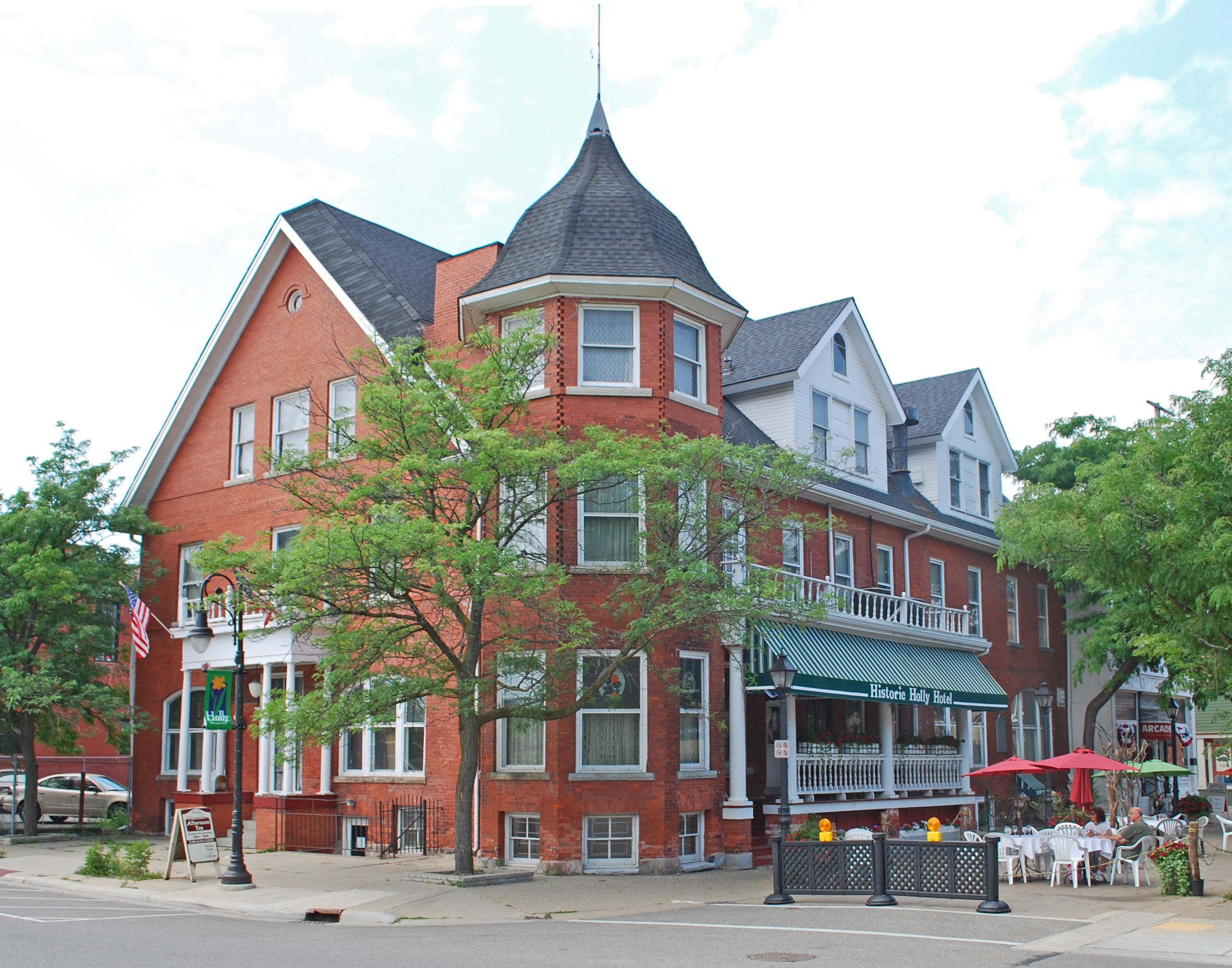
Hirst (Holly) Hotel

== See also ==
- National Register of Historic Places listings in Oakland County, Michigan
