= Plymouth Subdivision =

Railway line in Michigan

Overview
- Status: active
- Locale: Michigan, United States

Service
- Type: freight railroad
- System: CSX Transportation

History
- Opened: August 31, 1871

Technical
- Line length: 124 mi (200 km)
- Number of tracks: 1
- Track gauge: 4 ft 8 1/2 in (1,435 mm) standard gauge
- Highest elevation: 1,000.4 ft (304.9 m)

The Plymouth Subdivision is a freight railroad line in the U.S. state of Michigan. It is owned by CSX. It connects the Plymouth Diamond at milepost CH 24.5 to Grand Rapids at CH 148.1, passing through the Lansing metropolitan area en route. Other towns served include South Lyon, Brighton, Howell, Fowlerville, Williamston, Grand Ledge, Lake Odessa, Clarksville, and Alto. Operationally, it is part of the CSX Chicago Division, dispatched from Jacksonville, Florida.

== History ==
Construction of what is now the 124-mile Plymouth Subdivision was attempted in the 1860s by a succession of short-lived and undercapitalized railroad companies, including the Detroit and Howell Railroad (organized 1864), the Ionia and Lansing Railroad (organized 1865), the Howell and Lansing Railroad (organized 1868), and the Detroit, Howell and Lansing Railroad (created by merger 1870). Principal construction on the Lansing–Detroit segment was completed by the Detroit, Lansing and Lake Michigan Railroad (created by merger 1871), with operations commencing on August 31, 1871.

In 1896 control of this east–west mainline through the state capital passed to the Detroit, Grand Rapids and Western Railroad (DGR&W), and subsequently by merger to the Pere Marquette Railroad (later Railway) in 1900. Though never among the most profitable railroads, the Pere Marquette persevered until it merged with the Chesapeake and Ohio Railway (C&O) in 1947. The C&O became part of the Chessie System in 1972, and was absorbed into CSX Transportation in 1987.

=== Route ===
For most of its length the Plymouth Subdivision crosses gently rolling farm and forested terrain, passing through small towns and the state capital. The high point, east of Lansing, is 1000.4 feet above sea level at Canwell (CH 51), and the low point is 830.6 feet at Beck (CH 27), for an elevation change of 169.8 feet. The steepest grade in this segment is 1.2% west of Canwell. The high point west of Lansing is 883.1 feet at Saddlebag Road/M-66(CH 116), and the low point is 690.7 feet at the Thornapple River (CH 139), for an elevation change of 192.4 feet. The steepest grade west of Lansing is 1.8% in the vicinity of Jordan Lake Avenue on the eastern side of the town of Lake Odessa. Despite the relatively modest grades, trains occasionally stall climbing Salem Hill west of Plymouth and coming east out of the Thornapple River valley.

The route of the Plymouth Subdivision has the following waypoints:

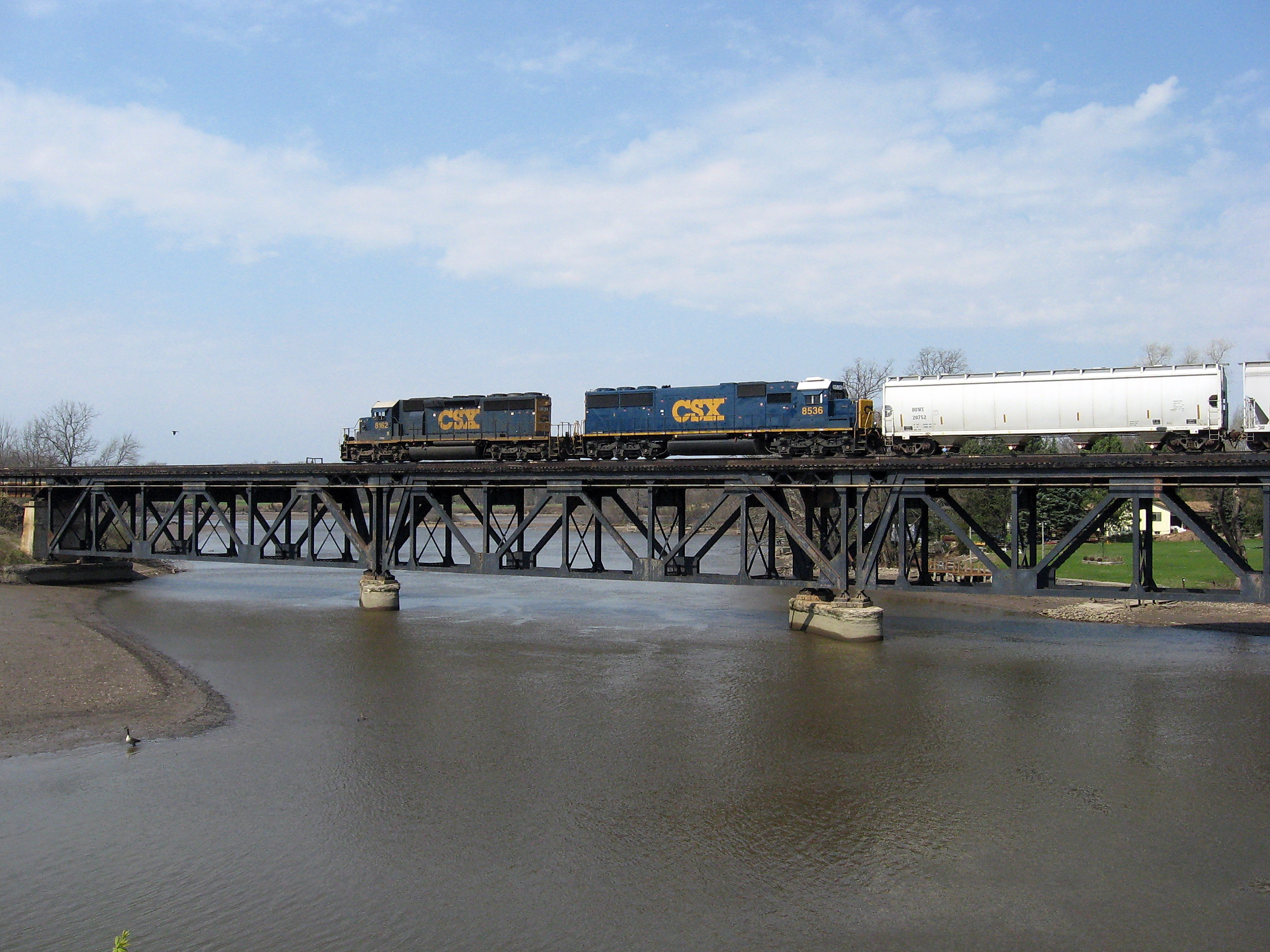
Thornapple River bridge on CSX Plymouth Subdivision

- Plymouth Diamond – CH 24.5 – the Plymouth Subdivision joins the CSX Detroit Subdivision and is crossed by the dual track north–south CSX Saginaw Subdivision at mile marker CC82.
- South Lyon – CH 36.2 to CH 37.7 – 6750-ft passing siding, south side
- Green Oak – CH 39.1 – defect detector - announces axle count, stopped announcing length in mid August, 2022.
- Brighton – CH 45.3 to CH 46.8 – 7000-ft passing siding, north side
- Ann Pere – CH 52.8 – junction (single wye) with the Great Lakes Central Railroad
- Howell – CH 52.8 to CH 54.2 – 5450-ft passing siding, north side
- Fowlerville – CH 60.7 to CH 62.0 – 7060-ft passing siding, south side
- Fowlerville – CH 64.0 – defect detector
- Williamston – CH 71.5 to CH73.0 – 7150-ft passing siding, south side
- Okemos – CH 79.9 – defect detector
- Trowbridge – CH 83.1 to CH 84.8 – 8000-ft passing siding, south side; the MSU power plant spur is near the west end of this section
- Trowbridge Diamond – CH 84.9 – the Plymouth Subdivision is crossed by the CN Flint Division (dual track) just west of the East Lansing Amtrak station on Harrison Road; there are no wyes for interchange
- Michigan Avenue – CH87.2 – junction with Jackson and Lansing Railroad (formerly Norfolk Southern's Lansing Branch)
- North Lansing – CH88.3 – begin double track to west end of Ensel Yard at CH90.0
- Grand Ledge – CH 97.8 to CH 99.1 – 5650-ft passing siding, north side
- Grand Ledge Yard – CH 98.5 – access from siding
- Sunfield – CH 111 to CH 112.3 – 5750-ft passing siding, north side (Siding removed November 2020)
- Lake Odessa – CH 120.4 to CH 121.7 – 5400-ft passing siding, north side
- Elmdale – CH 130.4 to CH 131.7 – 5500-ft passing siding, north side
- Fox – CH 141.8 to CH 143.3 – 7000-ft passing siding, south side
- Seymour – CH 148.1 – joins Grand Rapids Terminal

Notable bridges are a three-span Warren deck truss bridge over the Thornapple River (42.878264°N 85.477524°W), the 1887 "High Bridge" trestle over the Grand River at Grand Ledge (42.758195°N 84.755470°W), and a deck plate girder bridge over the Red Cedar River and Lansing's River Trail (42.7227021°N 84.5158731°W).

=== Traffic ===
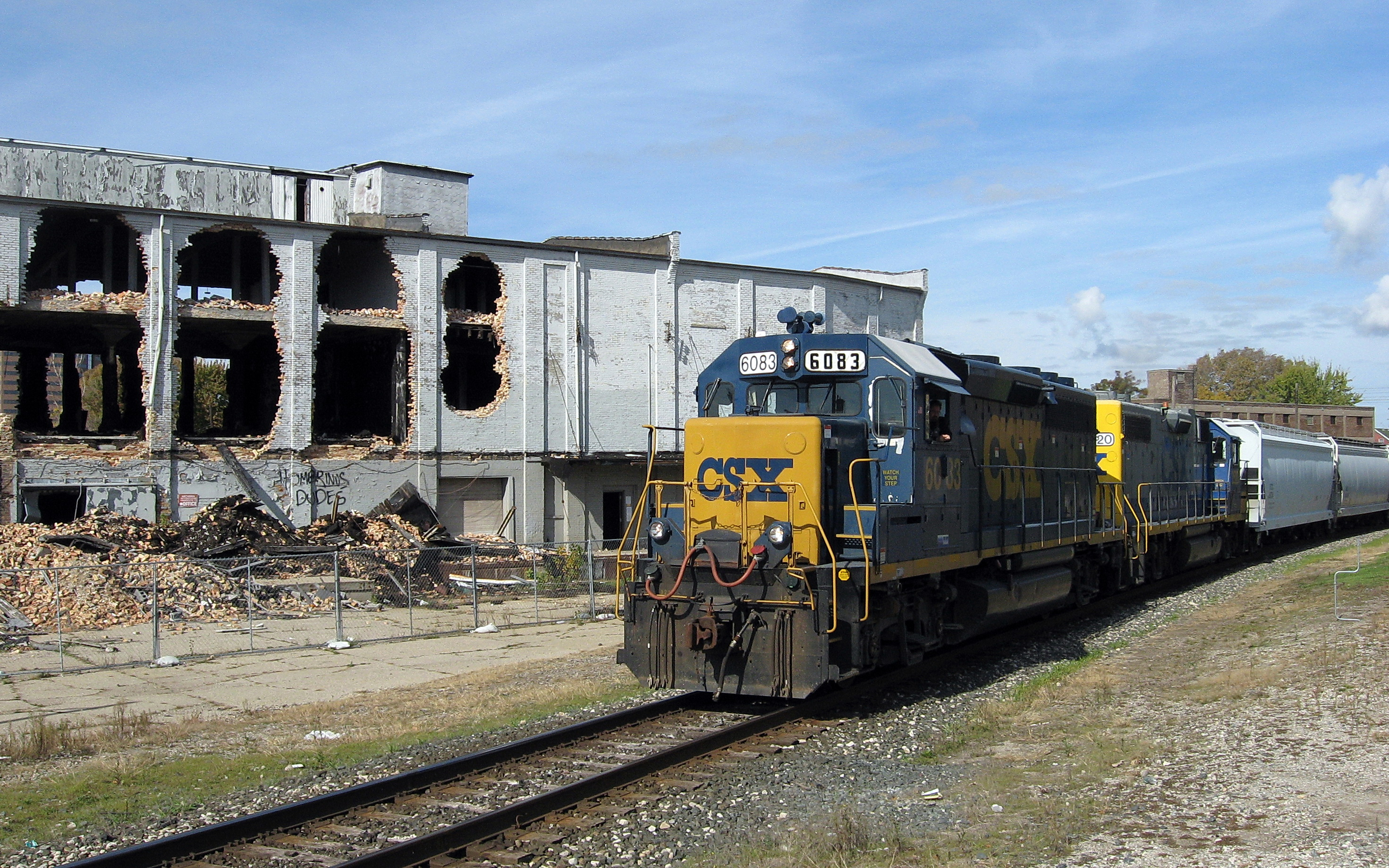
A CSX local heads east along the Plymouth Subdivision through Lansing

When it was the Pere Marquette's primary route and the mainline between Michigan's two largest cities, the Plymouth Subdivision's rails were bustling with traffic. Even as late as the mid-1980s, in the first years under CSX, the line saw a dozen CSX and four Soo Line freights daily, in addition to numerous locals and commodity trains. Over time, however, much of that traffic moved southward, using Norfolk Southern's tracks from Detroit to Chicago via Butler, Indiana and CSX's own B&O route between Toledo and Chicago through Garrett, Indiana. As of June 2011, only two pairs of symboled trains are regularly seen on the Plymouth Subdivision, giving it the character of a branch line rather than a mainline. Current and former trains include:

Current trains:

(East of Lansing Ensel Yard)

- CSX M328 (Was L302) - Rougemere (Detroit Sub) to Grand Rapids. Mixed manifest between Rougemere and Grand Rapids, stops at Lansing Ensel Yard. Currently running daily.
- CSX M329 (Was L303) - Grand Rapids to Rougemere. Mixed manifest between Grand Rapids and Rougemere, stops at Ensel Yard. Currently running daily.
- CSX L305 - Lansing Ensel to Howell* - Local, services east of Lansing to the GLC interchange at Ann Pere, sometimes works Peaker Services in South Lyon.

Locals operating west from Plymouth Yard, east and west from Ensel Yard, and east from Wyoming Yard in Grand Rapids switch customers along this line. A nightly local (CSX L304) services customers between Ensel and Lake Odessa. A daily local (CSX L305)services customers between Ensel and South Lyon. L305 also shuttles cars from Ensel to interchange with the GLC railroad at the AnnPere diamond interchange track near Howell. A daily yard job train (CSX Y106) serves customers between Wyoming yard and the Elmdale siding.

Full and empty commodity trains (grain/coal/lime/potash/stone) operate over the Plymouth Subdivision on an irregular basis.

Former trains:

- CSX Q326- Chicago-Grand Rapids-Detroit (Now a Chicago-Grand Rapids run)
- CSX Q327 - Detroit-Grand Rapids-Chicago (Now a Grand Rapids-Chicago run)
- CSX Q328 - Eastbound, Grand Rapids to Detroit. Switches Ensel Yard.

(Eliminated 2020; Traffic ran via Toledo and Chicago, now D706)

- CSX Q329 - Westbound, Detroit to Grand Rapids. Switches Ensel Yard.

(Eliminated 2020; Traffic ran via Toledo and Chicago, now D705)

- CSX Q334 - eastbound, Barr to Toledo via Grand Rapids (reinstated to daily service in September 2017, abolished in October 2017)
- CSX Q335 - westbound, Toledo to Grand Rapids to Chicago. BRC section of train continued onto Clearing Yard in Chicago (reinstated in September 2017, abolished in October 2017)
- CP X500 - Chicago to Detroit via Grand Rapids (rerouted over Norfolk Southern effective October 2010)
- CSX N956 - Powder River basin (western) Coal from BNSF interchange in Chicago to Consumers power Essexville, MI
- CSX E945- Empties returning from N956
- CSX D701 - Flint - Grand Rapids. 6 times weekly Mon-Sat. Operated May 2017 only.
- CSX D702 - Grand Rapids - Flint. 6 times weekly Sunday-Friday. Operated May 2017 only.
- CN x501 - Brighton - Detroit. operated April 12 2017 only
- CSX D901 - Grand Rapids - Brighton - Operated Late December 2020/Early January 2021, temporarily took over D708's GLC Interchange duties.
- CSX D705 - Detroit to Grand Rapids (Became L302 on 2/26/2022)
- CSX D706 - Grand Rapids to Detroit (Became L303 on 2/26/2022)
- CSX D707 - Lansing to Lake Odessa (Became L304 on 2/26/2022)
- CSX D708 - Lansing to Howell (Became L305 on 2/26/2022)

=== Signaling and Dispatching ===
All CSX operations in Michigan, including the Plymouth Subdivision, are managed by dispatchers in Jacksonville, Florida

The Plymouth Subdivision is CTC signaled from Plymouth diamond west to Lansing Ensel yard. A 30-mile portion west of Lansing Ensel yard to Lake Odessa is track warrant controlled by CSX form EC1 authority. The track warrant section is protected by automatic block signals in addition to the track warrants. CTC signals resume at Lake Odessa and continue west to Grand Rapids Wyoming yard.

The track warrant controlled section previously consisted of five ABS DTC controlled blocks (Cash, Ledge, Field, Jordan, and Lako). The DTC blocks were discontinued in favor of the form EC-1 authorities during the summer of 2011.

=== Passenger Service ===
There is no passenger service on the Plymouth Subdivision as of 2017, but surviving depot buildings in towns along its route are reminders of a different era.

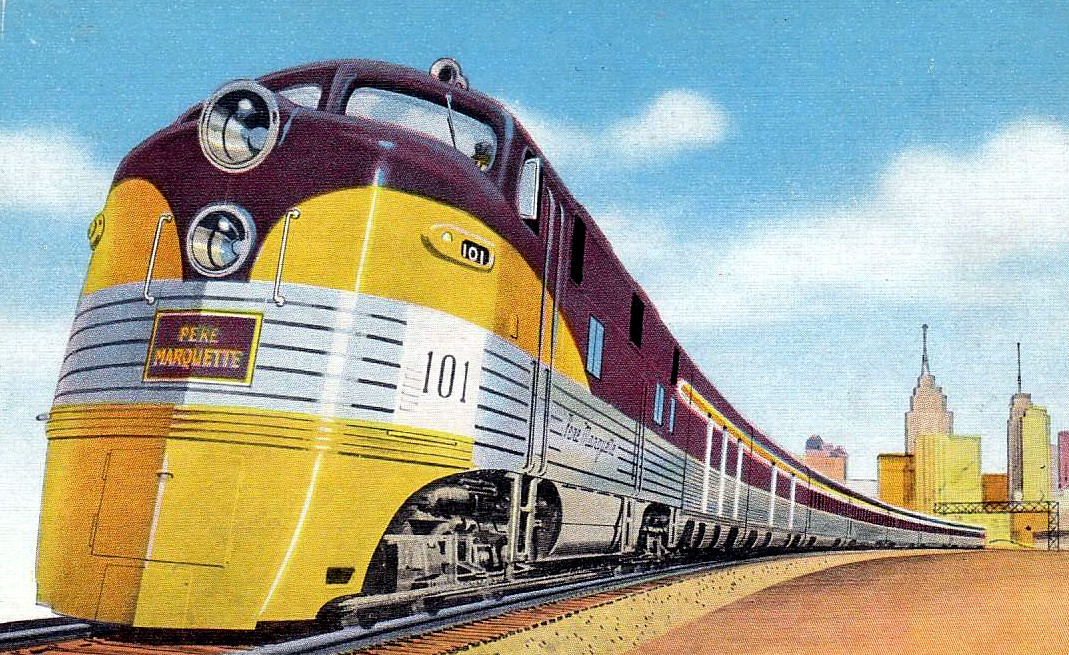
A postcard depiction of Pere Marquette's passenger trains in Michigan

In 1946, the Pere Marquette introduced the nation's first post-war lightweight streamlined passenger trains, operating between Detroit and Grand Rapids over the Plymouth Subdivision. These were the first diesel-powered trains on the Pere Marquette system, with power provided by EMD E7As pulling Pullman Standard cars. By 1947, there were three daily trains in each direction, an evening and a morning express and a mid-day (late evening on Sundays) local. The expresses had a scheduled trip of 2:40, with intermediate stops in Plymouth and Lansing. The local had a scheduled trip of 3:00 due to additional stops in Brighton, Howell, Fowlerville, Williamston, Grand Ledge and Lake Odessa. The service was continued by the Chesapeake & Ohio under the Pere Marquette name following the 1947 merger. The final passenger train ran on the Detroit-Grand Rapids route on April 30, 1971.

The Union Depot at Michigan Avenue, just blocks from the state Capitol, survives and was Clara's Lansing Station restaurant until the restaurant closed in 2016. The Williamston Depot was moved a half mile to Grand River Avenue in 1979, where it now houses a museum and the city Chamber of Commerce. The Fowlerville Depot is still owned by the Pere Marquette successor CSX and used as a base for track maintenance crews. As in Williamston, the Lake Odessa Depot survived through relocation and repurposing as a museum.
