= Rolston cabin =

Building

Coordinates: 42.81575°N 83.53219°W

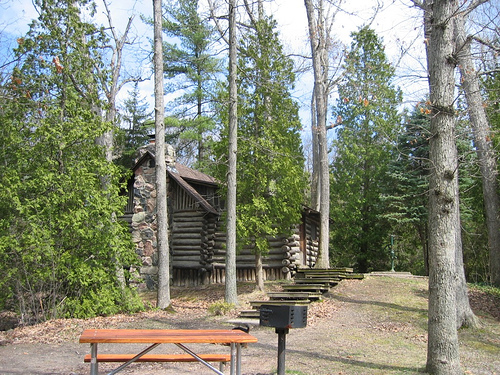
Rolston Cabin

Constructed between the years of 1938 and 1939 the Rolston Cabin is located within Holly Recreation Area in Holly, Michigan. It is one of the few remaining rustic cabins within the state parks of Michigan.

== History ==
In 1938, William Rolston built a rustic log cabin on land he had purchased from a friend, Mr. Chandler. His wife Francis Rolston and friends John and Ruth Gaskin also helped with the construction. For years to come it was the site of a turkey shoot, gatherings of friends and family and campfires. The cabin was a place for fun and adventure. Bill Rolston was often seen around the cabin dressed in frontier garb hunting for dinner.

== About ==
The cabin is within the woods and has its own secluded pond. It is a semi-rustic cabin. There is electricity, lighting and a kitchen that has a refrigerator, microwave, stove and kitchen table. The living space includes a fold out couch, television and fireplace. The cabin also includes a loft above that has an additional four beds. There is an outhouse, hand pump, fire pit, picnic table and grill are also available directly outside the cabin.

== Features ==
The cabin is available all year round. Heat is provided by a fireplace during the winter. During the summer the woods keep the cabin cool. The cabin also offers some items left behind by other guests. These things include cooking supplies, cups, plates and even food. There is also a visitors log book in the cabin that guests leave small journal entries in about their stay at the cabin.

== Activities ==
The cabin offers a historical getaway. Holly Recreation Area has almost 8,000 acres (32 km^{2}) of rolling woodlands, several lakes, picnicking, swimming, fishing, hiking, cross-country ski trails, rowboat, canoe and paddleboats. All of these activities are in walking distance. The small pond next to the cabin has no fish but is available during the winter as a skating rink.
