= Shiawassee River Heritage Water Trail =

Water trail along Shiawassee River in Michigan

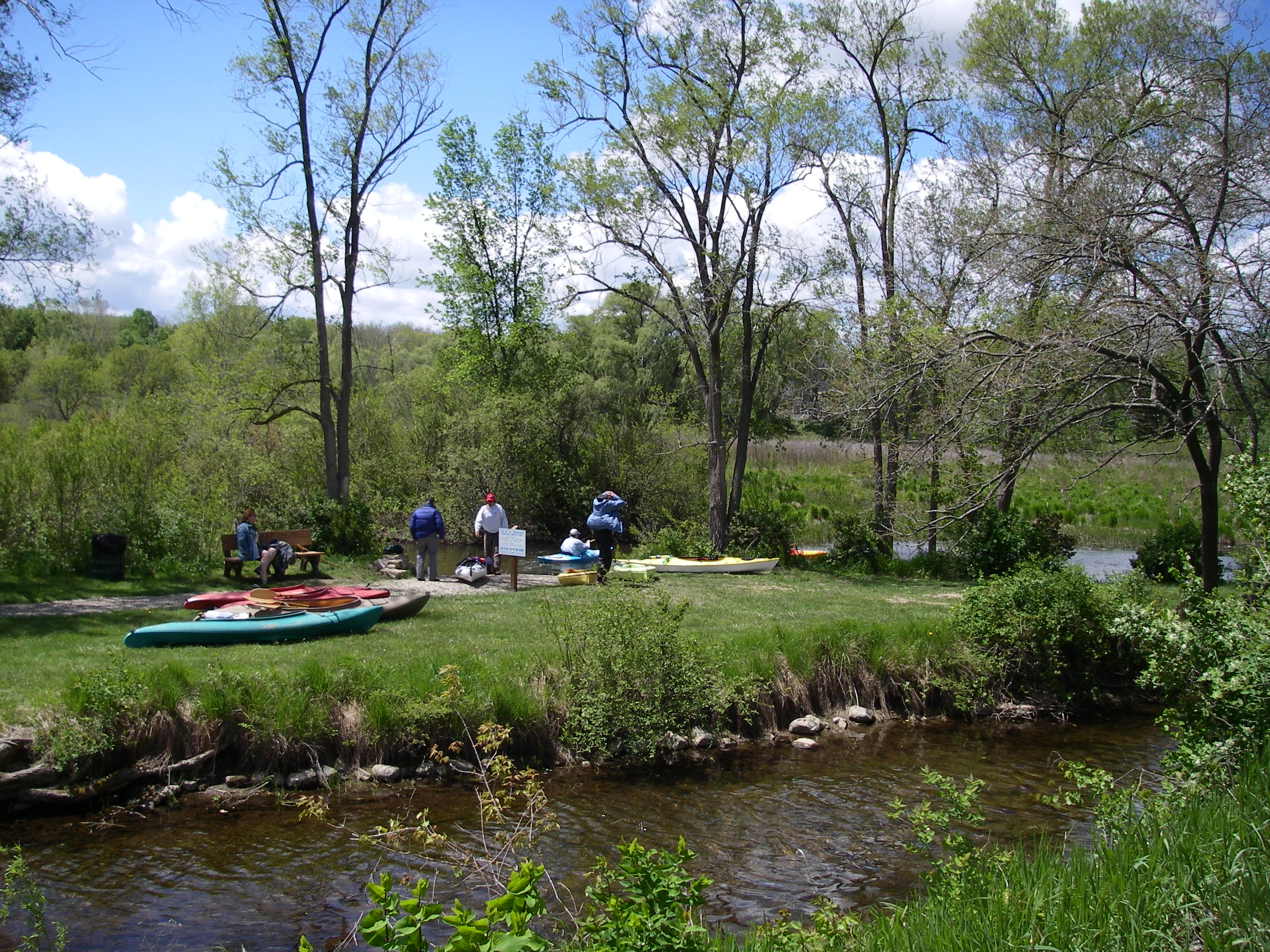
- Canoe and kayak launch site for Shiawassee River at WaterWorks Park in Holly, Michigan

- Location within Michigan
- Type: Water trail
- Location: Shiawassee River, within Genesee County and Oakland County
- Nearest city: Holly, Michigan and Fenton, Michigan
- Coordinates: 42°47.172′N 83°37.565′W
- Length: 7 miles (11 km)

The Shiawassee River Heritage Water Trail / Shiawassee River National Water Trail started as a 7 miles (11 km) water trail in the Shiawassee River, within Genesee County and Oakland County, Metro Detroit, southeastern Michigan. It now reaches 85.5 miles (137.6 km) from Holly to Chesaning in Saginaw County. It was the Heritage Water Trail in Oakland County, then as it went to Chesaning, it became a State Water Trail and then a National Water Trail.

== Geography ==
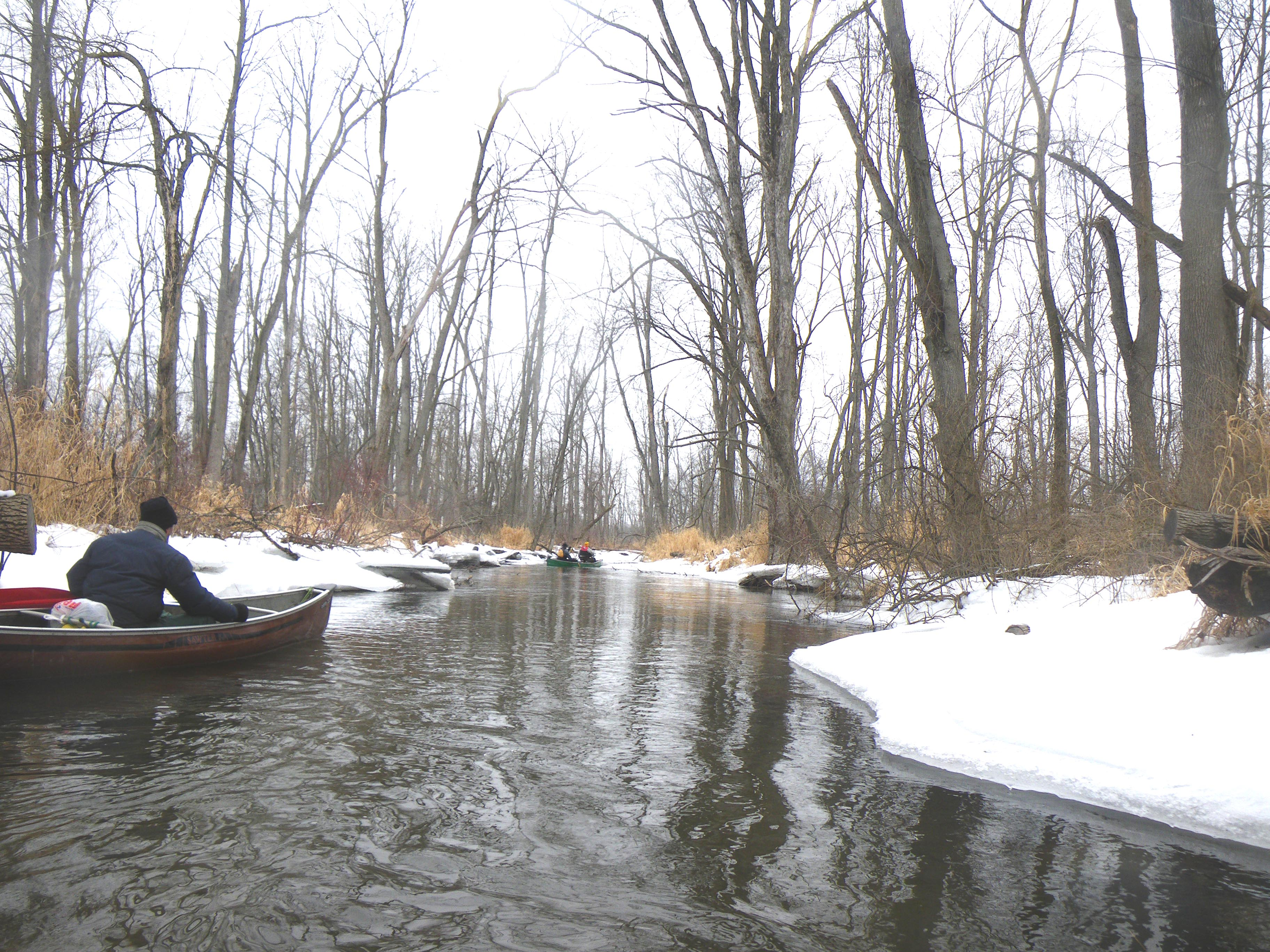
Canoe and kayak paddling upon Shiawassee River in January 2010

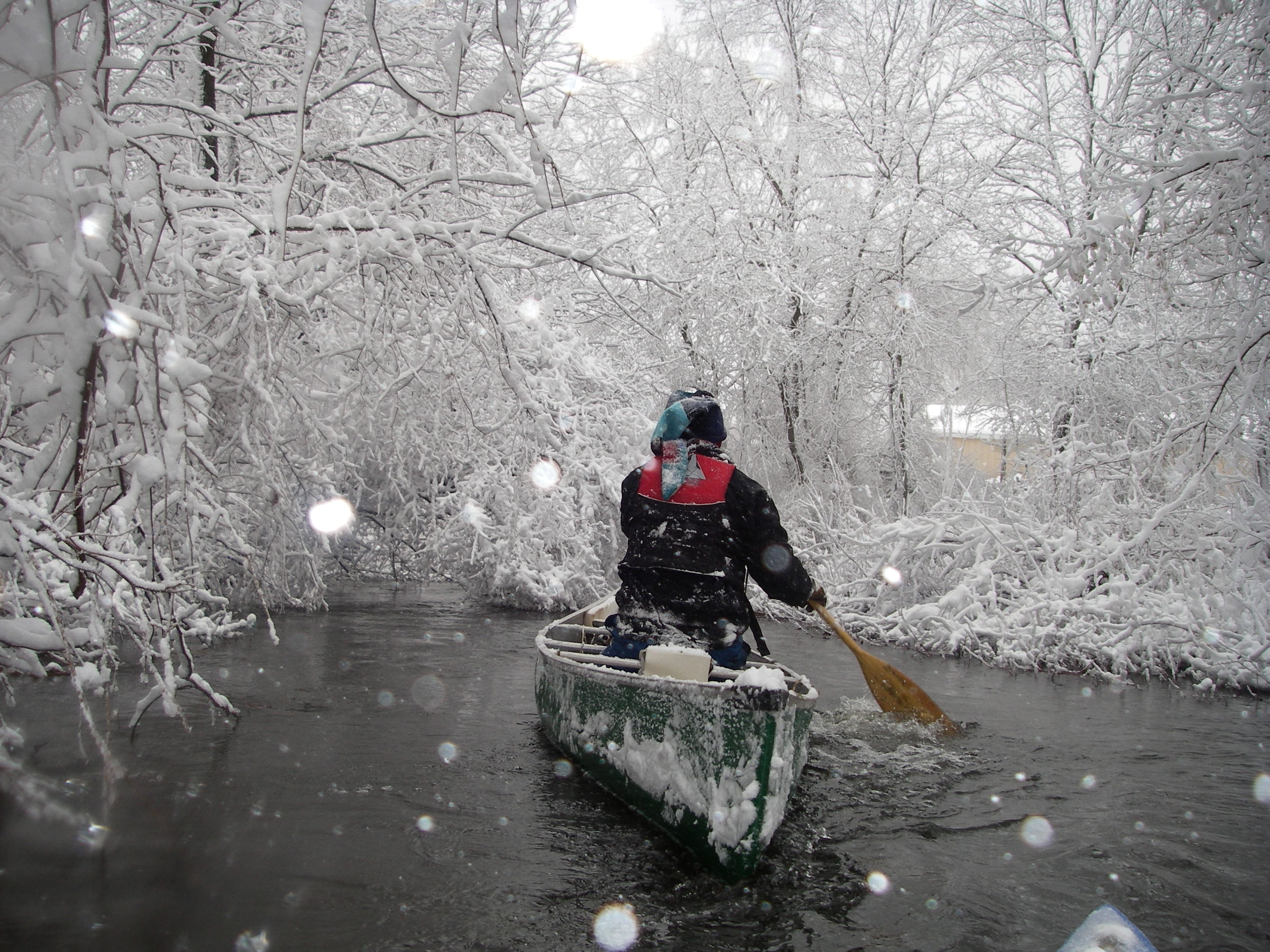
Canoeing the Shiawassee River in February 2006 near Holly, Michigan

The 7 miles (11 km) water trail in the Shiawassee River begins in Holly, Michigan at WaterWorks Park and extends eighty eight miles downstream to St. Charles, Michigan. There are signs that discuss the trail, its history and what to expect along the trail. Municipalities, Townships and Volunteer organizations have come together to form the Shiawassee River Water Trail Coalition with the goal of promoting the trail for paddling from Holly to Saginaw Bay.

The City of Fenton maintains a boat launch at Strom Park. From there, one has to portage around the Fenton Mill Pond Dam. The Keepers of the Shiawassee in cooperation with the City of Fenton Parks Commission has built a canoe launch in Bush Park. From Bush Park down stream, the next official take out is the Michigan Department of Natural Resource's boat launch in Lake Ponemah. The City of Linden has a take out above the Linden Mill Pond Dam and a put in just below it, with a path to use for portaging around the dam.

The trail continues to be extended every year as University of Michigan-Flint's University Outreach program and the Shiawassee River Water Trail Coalition continue to work with local governments to take an active role in protecting natural infrastructure such as rivers and streams.

This water trail is now a National Water Trail from Holly, MI to Chesaning, MI. Communities along the river have been building public launches and installing porta-potties all along the water trail

== History ==
Work on making this river a paddling resource started with Headwaters Trails Inc., a non-profit group in Holly. Through the promotional efforts of the group's president, Sue Julian, and others within Headwaters Trails, other groups along the Shiawassee River joined the efforts.

A canoe launch was constructed by Headwaters Trails in Water Works Park with the approval of the Village of Holly and grant money from REI. The Charles Stewart Mott Foundation gave money to build a foot bridge across the Water Works sluice, connecting the parking area of the park with the canoe launch. Money for the interpretive signs and the mile posts which go as far as Strom Park in Fenton was donated to Headwaters Trails by Saginaw Bay Watershed Initiative Network in 2007.

A June 2009 $16,000 grant from the Fenton Community Fund of the Community Foundation of Greater Flint in June 2009 provided signage, mile markers and launch points in a 25-mile navigable path along the waterway from downtown Fenton to Argentine Township.

Headwaters Trails acquired an acre of land along Fish Lake Road in Holly, at the Shiawassee River. This has been turned into a canoe launch with parking and has been donated to Holly Township. Money for this came from several sources, including the Ralph C. Wilson Jr. Foundation, Saginaw Bay WIN, Holly Township and many other contributions.

New launches have been built in Fenton, Linden, Argentine Township, Byron, Owosso, and Chesaning, with others still in the planning stages. The Shiawassee River Water Trail Coalition has been working to remove blockages in the river to restore it to a more natural flow.

== Operation ==
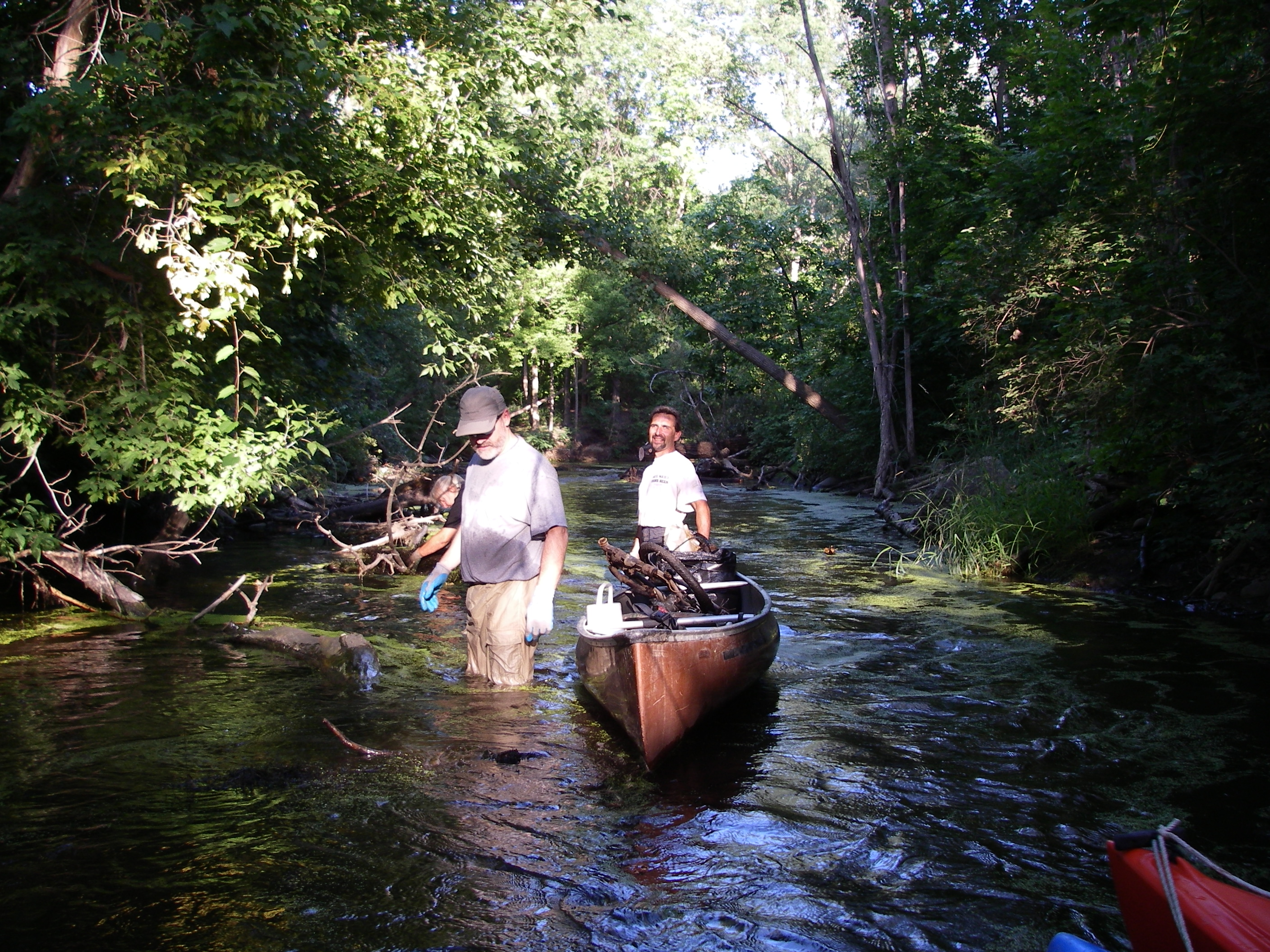
HeadWatersTrails Inc. members clearing the Shiawassee River in July 2008 near Bush Park in Fenton, Michigan

The City of Linden, City of Fenton, the Keepers of the Shiawassee, Headwaters Trails, and the Friends of the Shiawassee are all active in maintaining the river. Headwaters Trails has had crews each year go as far as Owosso, Michigan, removing large woody debris blockages. The maintenance of the river is done using "Best Practices", only cutting what is necessary and anchoring the logs along the banks of the river. The anchoring protects the banks of the river and maintains fish habitat. In addition, tons of garbage, ranging from tires, oil tanks, bicycles, traffic barricades, drink containers, food wrappers and other discarded material have been removed from the river.

Fenton sponsors a river cleanup of the river from Bush Park to Lake Ponemah in June, every year. They have been working on a footpath along the river that they hope to extend over time to Torrey Road.

Headwaters Trails has several cleanups of the river, with the first ones in May to prepare for its Paddle with Friends along the river in June. There are cleanups as needed up to September of each year.

Many conservation groups, including the North Oakland Headwaters Land Conservancy, the Michigan Nature Association, and The Nature Conservancy have acquired easements along the river to keep development away from the shores.

The wastewater treatment plant in Holly is a modern facility that releases clean water into the river. Testing of invertebrates in the river has shown that the water below the waste water treatment plant is no different from water above the waste water treatment plant.

== See also ==
- Shiawassee River
- Tip of The Thumb Heritage Water Trail
