= Gruber's Grinder =

Mountain bike trail in Holly, Michigan

Coordinates: 42.8296°N 83.5794°W

Gruber's Grinder a mountain bike trail in Holly, Michigan, United States.

Paul Gary Gruber was born and lived in Michigan. Once a hard core mountain bike rider and racer, he took second place with Tail Wind Production and the MMBA Points Series. He was instrumental in developing a race venue that included bike races at the Big M and Owasippi trails. Gruber mapped off, designed, developed and built this mountain bike path at Holly Recreation Area in Southeast Michigan. This very technical trail measures 15.6 miles long. It is a tight, twisty, single track.
