= Holly Union Depot =

- U.S. National Register of Historic Places
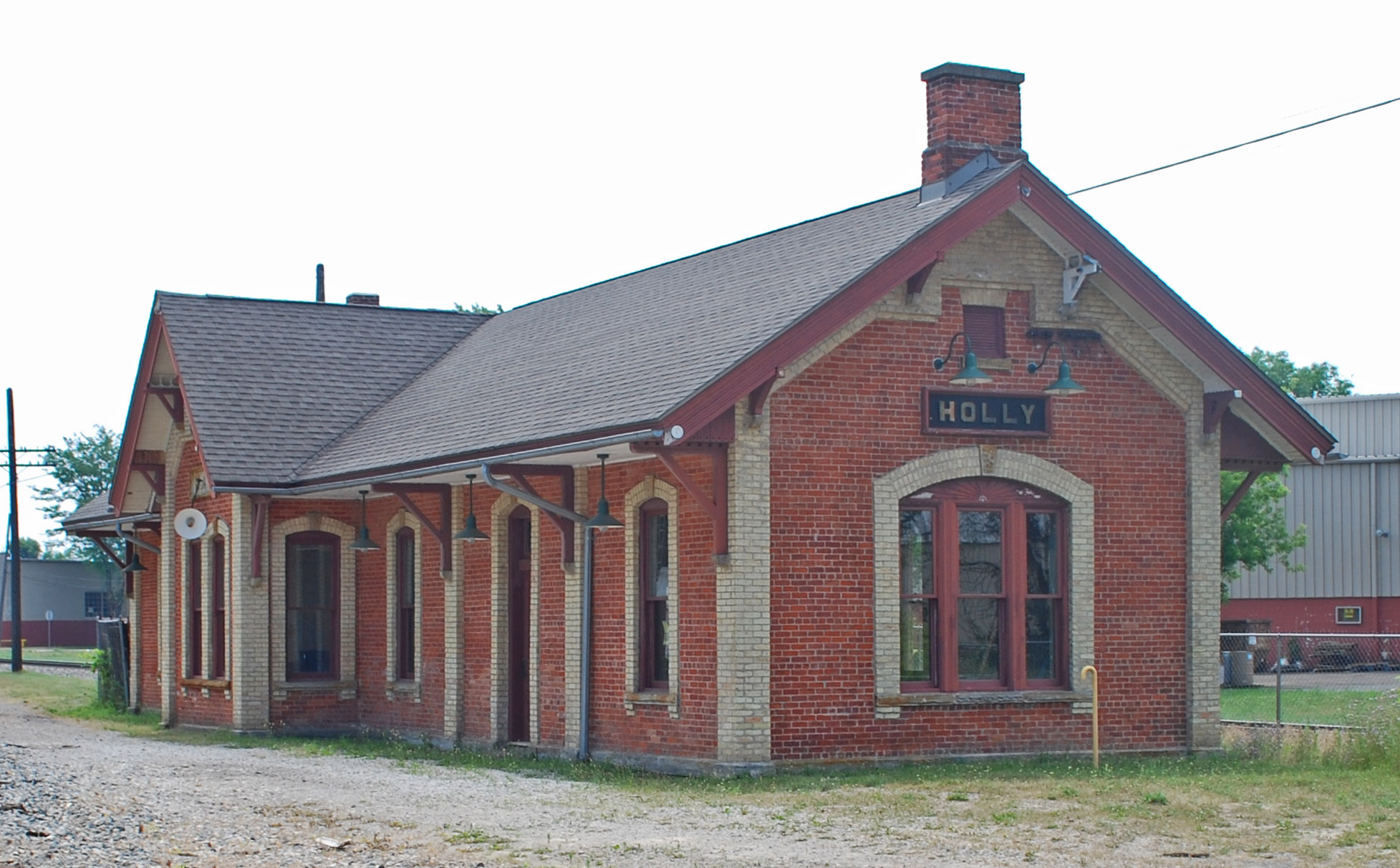
- Interactive map
- Location: 223 S. Broad St. Holly, Michigan
- Coordinates: 42°47′21″N 83°37′27″W
- Area: less than one acre
- Built: 1885
- Built by: Heitsch and Son
- Architectural style: Late Victorian
- NRHP reference No.: 00000645
- Added to NRHP: December 21, 2000

The Holly Union Depot is a former train station located at 223 South Broad Street in Holly, Michigan. It was listed on the National Register of Historic Places in 2000. It sits at the junction of tracks which are now owned by CSX Transportation and Canadian National Railway.

== History ==
Saw and grist mills were established in what is now Holly in 1843 and 1844, and a village slowly grew up around them. However, real growth only began with the arrival of the Detroit and Milwaukee Railway (later the Detroit, Grand Haven and Milwaukee Railway and now part of the Canadian National Railway) in 1855. The D & M Railway constructed a small wooden depot, and soon replaced it with a better one. In 1864, a second railroad line, the Flint and Holly Railroad (now part of the CSX Saginaw Subdivision), was completed into Holly. The two rail lines co-operated to build a union depot to serve both lines, located at the site of the present depot. This wooden depot burned in 1884.

The two railways created temporary space for passengers in their freight sheds, and in September 1885 contracted with Heitsch and Son of Pontiac to construct a new depot and baggage room. Construction began in October and was complete in February 1886. The depot served passengers on the two lines and their successors until 1964, (Note: Later a part of the Chesapeake and Ohio Railway, there was a Ludington–Toledo direct service before 1930s as part of the Pere Marquette Railway. The service previously bypassed Detroit via Plymouth.) when the Grand Trunk Western Railroad ceased passenger operations through Holly. It was later used as storage by the railroad, and in 1998 the village of Holly purchased the building. It has since been restored. As of 2018, the depot may be moved to another location.

== Description ==
The Holly Union Depot is a long, single-story cross-gable-roof structure made from reddish-orange and yellow-buff brick on a stone foundation. It has broadly overhanging eaves supported by open triangular timber brackets. Gabled projections are on each long side; these once contained separate ticket offices for the two railways. A rectangular carved stone plaque is set into the facade of each projection, containing the town name, HOLLY, in raised capital letters. The building is eighty-two feet ten inches long and twenty-two feet four inches wide.

== See also ==
- National Register of Historic Places listings in Oakland County, Michigan

== Notes ==
| Preceding station | Chesapeake and Ohio Railway | Following station |
|---|---|---|
| Newark toward Bay City | Bay City – Detroit | Rose Centre toward Detroit |
| Preceding station | Grand Trunk Western Railroad | Following station |
| Davisburg toward Detroit | Detroit and Milwaukee Division | Fenton toward Grand Haven |
