= Holly Hotel =

- Hirst Hotel
- U.S. National Register of Historic Places
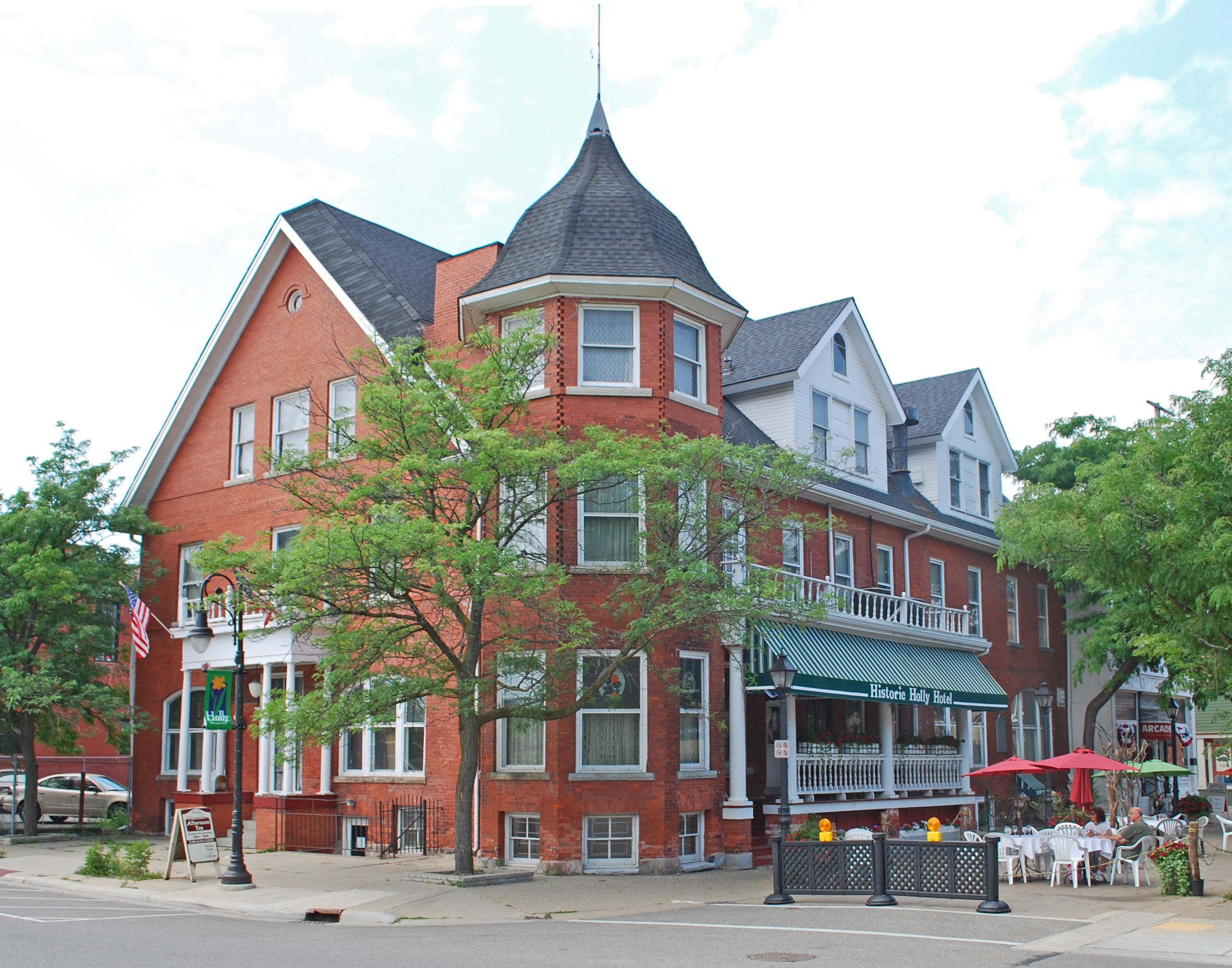
- Interactive map showing building location
- Location: 110 Battle Alley, Holly, Michigan
- Coordinates: 42°47′27″N 83°37′36″W
- Area: 0.3 acres (0.12 ha)
- Built: 1891
- Architectural style: Queen Anne
- NRHP reference No.: 80001887
- Added to NRHP: February 8, 1980

The Holly Hotel, also known as the Hirst Hotel, is an inn located at 110 Battle Alley in Holly, Michigan. It was listed on the National Register of Historic Places in 1980. It currently operates as a restaurant.

== History ==
The Hirst Hotel was built in 1891 by John Hirst to cater to the flow of railroad passengers passing through Holly. Having the largest and finest dining room in the area, the hotel rapidly became the social center of the surrounding community. The hotel itself was one of the best in the area, and attracted guests such as Michigan Governors Thomas E. Dewey and G. Mennen Williams and temperance crusader Carrie Nation.

In 1912, businessman Joseph P. Allen bought the building. In 1913, the hotel suffered a disastrous fire, completely destroying the second and third floors. Allen rebuilt the structure, but in a somewhat more modest style, with a shorter tower, plainer second floor fenestration, and plainer porches. The hotel reopened as the Allendorf in late 1913. In 1913, Henry Norton purchased the building, redecorated it, and renamed it the Hotel Norton. However, as the passenger train traffic dwindled and finally stopped, the hotel became less desirable, and the building eventually became just a local restaurant.

In 1978, the hotel suffered another disastrous fire. Local resident Dr. Leslie Sher purchased the building and began restoring it, rebuilding the roof and tower to the original 1891 design. The building was reopened in 1979 as a restaurant. Every state governor since that time has dined at the Holly Hotel, as well as President George H. W. Bush during his 1992 campaign. On June 21, 2022, the building sustained heavy damage in another fire that destroyed multiple other buildings nearby in Holly's downtown. The owners plan to rehabilitate the hotel and reopen in the summer of 2023.

== Description ==
The Holly Hotel is a 2-1/2 story rectangular red brick Queen Anne structure with a hip roof, measuring about 50 feet wide by 75 feet long. A three-story, helmet-domed, octagonal corner tower is located between two primary facades. The longer facade facing Battle Alley is asymmetrical, containing a columned porch sheltering a pair of entry doors flanked by single windows on one side and two, large, tripartite windows under broad segmental arches on the other. The second floor has plain, one-over-one sash openings. Two large gabled dormers covered with shingling are located low on the steeply pitched hip roof.

The narrower elevation facing Broad Street is symmetrical, with a central entrance topped with a small-paned transom and flanked by segmentally arched, tripartite windows of the same type as those on the Battle Alley elevation. A small porch shelters the entrance. On the second floor are three one-over-one sash windows. A tall gable above contains three, closely spaced, plain, one-over-one, sash windows.

== See also ==
- National Register of Historic Places listings in Oakland County, Michigan
