= Holly Recreation Area =

State-run park near Holly, Michigan

Holly State Recreation Area
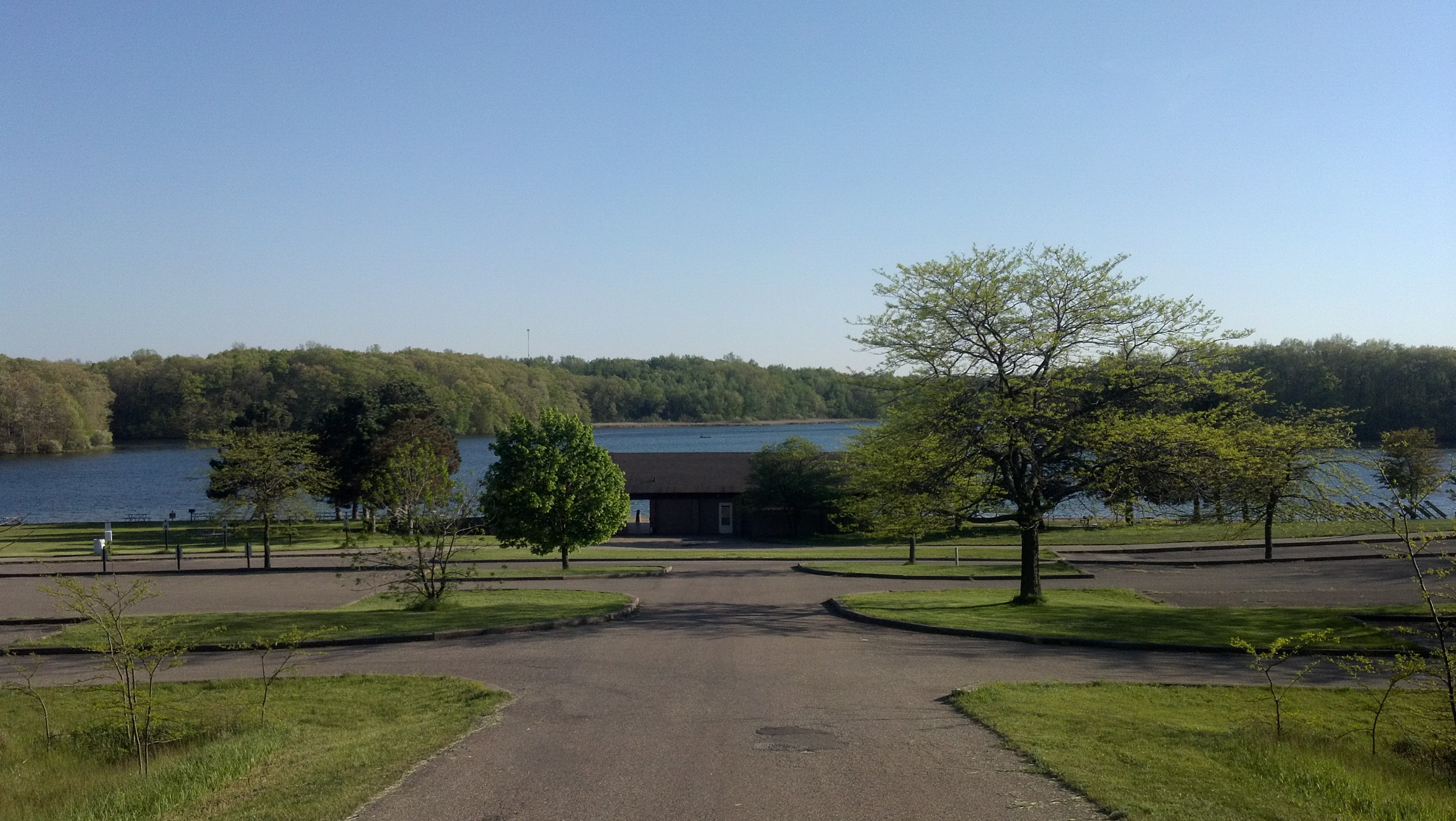
- Heron Lake Beach Area

- Location within Michigan Location within the United States
- Location: Lower Peninsula, Oakland County, Michigan USA
- Nearest city: Holly, Michigan
- Coordinates: 42.81444°N 83.5425°W
- Area: 7,817 acres (3,163 ha)
- Governing body: Michigan Department of Natural Resources
- Website: Official website

Holly State Recreation Area is a state recreation area in Groveland Township, near Holly, Michigan.

== Park Information ==
Covering 7,817 acres (3,163 ha) of rolling woodland and open fields, the park area is bisected by Dixie Highway and Interstate 75, with a majority of park features to the east, and the Holdbridge Lakes Mountain Bike Area to the west, featuring the Gruber's Grinder trail. Features include an 18-hole disc golf course, 35 miles (56 km) of hiking and mountain biking trails, a model airplane flying field, opportunities for swimming, fishing, boating, and hunting. Winter activities include cross-country skiing and snowmobiling. Camping is provided for at 160 campsites and 3 rustic cabins, one of which is the Rolston Cabin. There is a groomed beach with picnic tables, a snack bar, and boat rentals on Heron Lake. The park area also encompasses McGinnis Lake, Valley Lake, and Wildwood Lake.

The park typically sees the highest number of visitors in August and September, coinciding with the Michigan Renaissance Festival, which is located near the park.

The area is managed by the Michigan Department of Natural Resources.

== Gallery ==
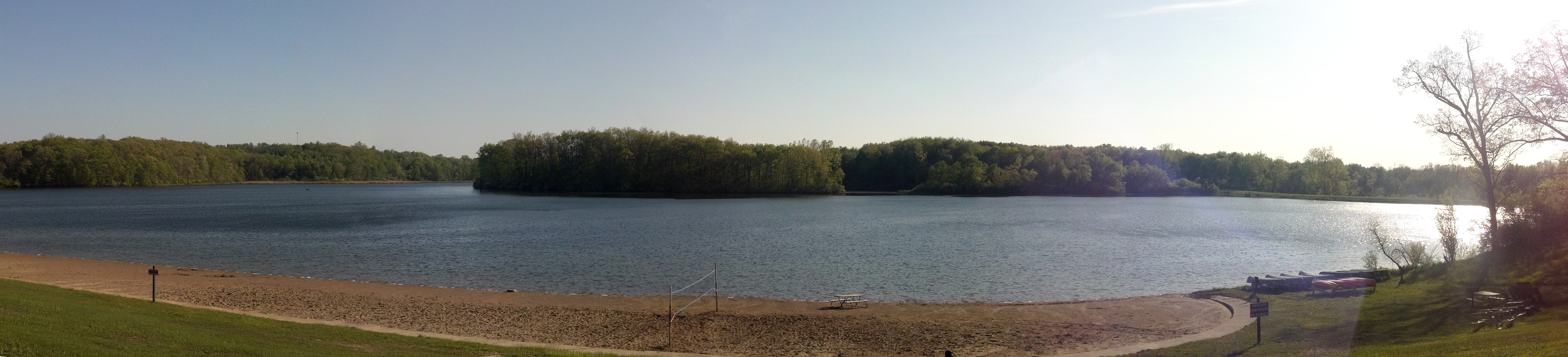
Heron Lake Beach Area

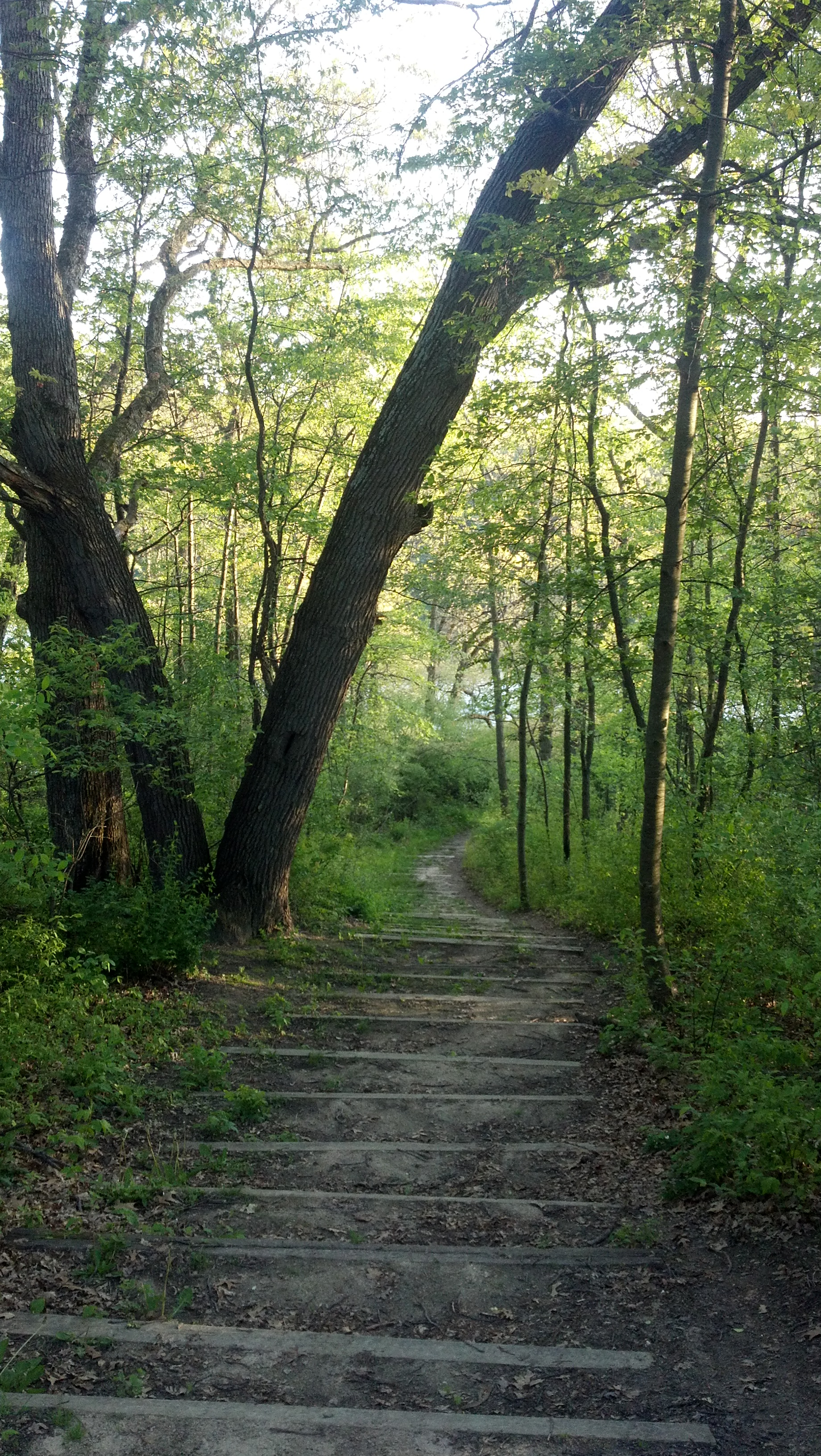
Lakeshore Trail

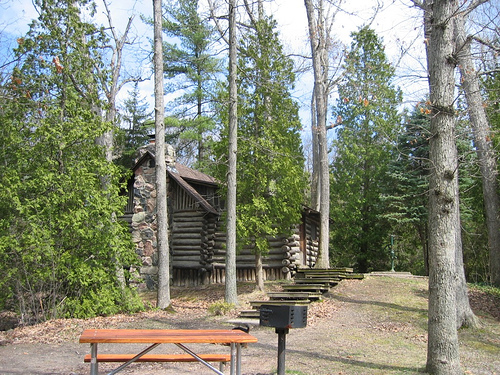
Rolston Cabin

== See also ==
- Seven Lakes State Park, a nearby state park
