= Water trail =

Marked routes on navigable waterways

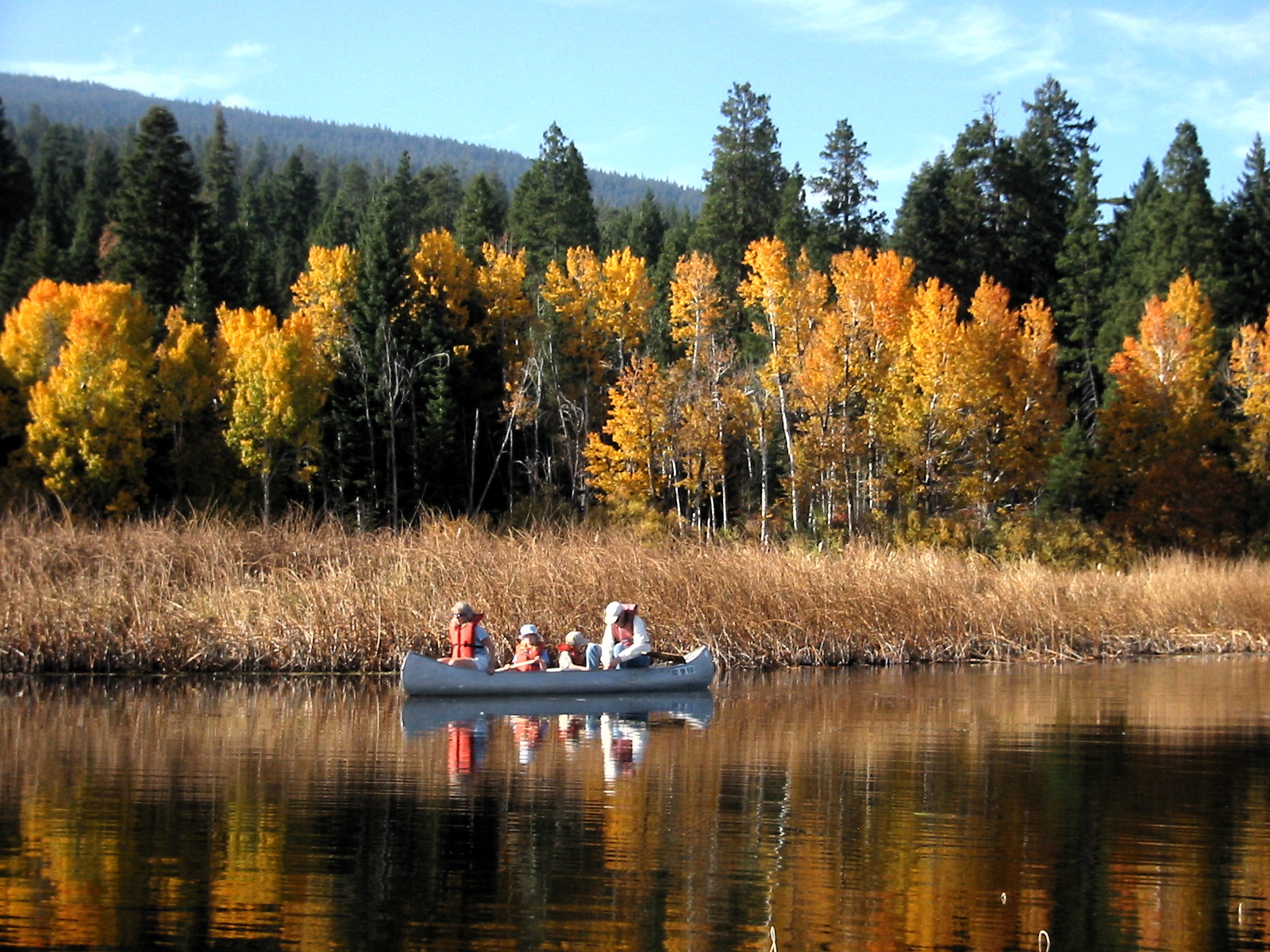
Paddlers on a canoe trail in Upper Klamath National Wildlife Refuge

Water trails (also known as blueways) are marked routes on navigable waterway such as rivers, lakes, canals, and coastlines for recreational use. They allow access to waterways for non-motorized boats and sometimes motorized vessels, inner tubes, and other craft. Water trails not only require suitable access points and take-outs for exit but also provide places ashore to camp and picnic or other facilities for boaters.

Water trails may be in public or private waters. In the United States, many water trails are assisted by the National Park Service. Local statutes may apply to landowners who steward water trails and the boaters who use them.

Much of the Trans Canada Trail will be a network of water trails open to canoes and other small vessels.

Recreational use of water trails is a form of ecotourism sometimes called "paddle tourism".

Notable water trails and blueways include:

- Allagash Wilderness Waterway
- Captain John Smith Chesapeake National Historic Trail
- Lake Michigan National Water Trail from Chicago to New Buffalo, Michigan
- Maine Island Trail
- Northern Forest Canoe Trail
- Ohio River Water Trail
- Red Rock Water Trail
- San Francisco Bay Area Water Trail
- Shiawassee River Heritage Water Trail
- Tennessee River Blueway
- Tip of The Thumb Heritage Water Trail
