= Saginaw Subdivision =

Railway line in Michigan

Overview
- Locale: Michigan
- Termini: Toledo, Ohio; Saginaw, Michigan

Service
- System: CSX

Technical
- Track gauge: 4 ft 8 1/2 in (1,435 mm)

The Saginaw Subdivision is a railroad line in the U.S. state of Michigan. The line runs 105 miles from Toledo, Ohio, to Saginaw, Michigan. CSX owns the line although since 2006, the section from Mt. Morris to Saginaw has been leased to the Lake State Railway but is still occasionally used by CSX. The Plymouth to Mt. Morris line was also leased to LSRC starting in March 2019.

== History ==
Before CSX Transportation operated trains on the Saginaw Subdivision, it was originally owned by the Pere Marquette Railway. In the year 1947, the PM was acquired by the Chesapeake and Ohio Railway. It continued under the control of the C&O until 1973 upon which the Chessie System assumed operations of the line. In 1980, when the Chessie System merged with the Seaboard System Railroad, the line became owned by its current owner, CSX. Over the years the line has lost a lot of traffic and many of the industrial spurs have since been abandoned. The Flint and Holly Railroad was built by businessman, and later Michigan Governor, Henry H. Crapo in the 1860s to serve his lumber mill. A park near the junction of Canadian National Railway's Holly Subdivision (a branch line of the old Grand Trunk Western Railroad), is named for him and a Michigan Historical Marker about him and the railroad's section stands there.

== Toledo to Plymouth ==
The line begins in Toledo, Ohio, where it connects with the Toledo Terminal Division. Heading north, the line comes into the village of Carleton, Michigan. In Carleton, the Conrail Lincoln Secondary branches off and the Canadian National Railway's Flat Rock Subdivision crosses. Continuing onto Wayne, Michigan, the line crosses the Michigan Line, operated by Amtrak. CSX trains can interchange with NS here. There is a Ford automobile plant, which requires autorack cars for loading. North of Wayne, it enters Plymouth, Michigan. At Plymouth Diamond (MP CH82), the Saginaw Subdivision meets the east-west CSX Plymouth Subdivision-Detroit Subdivision line.

== Plymouth to Mount Morris ==
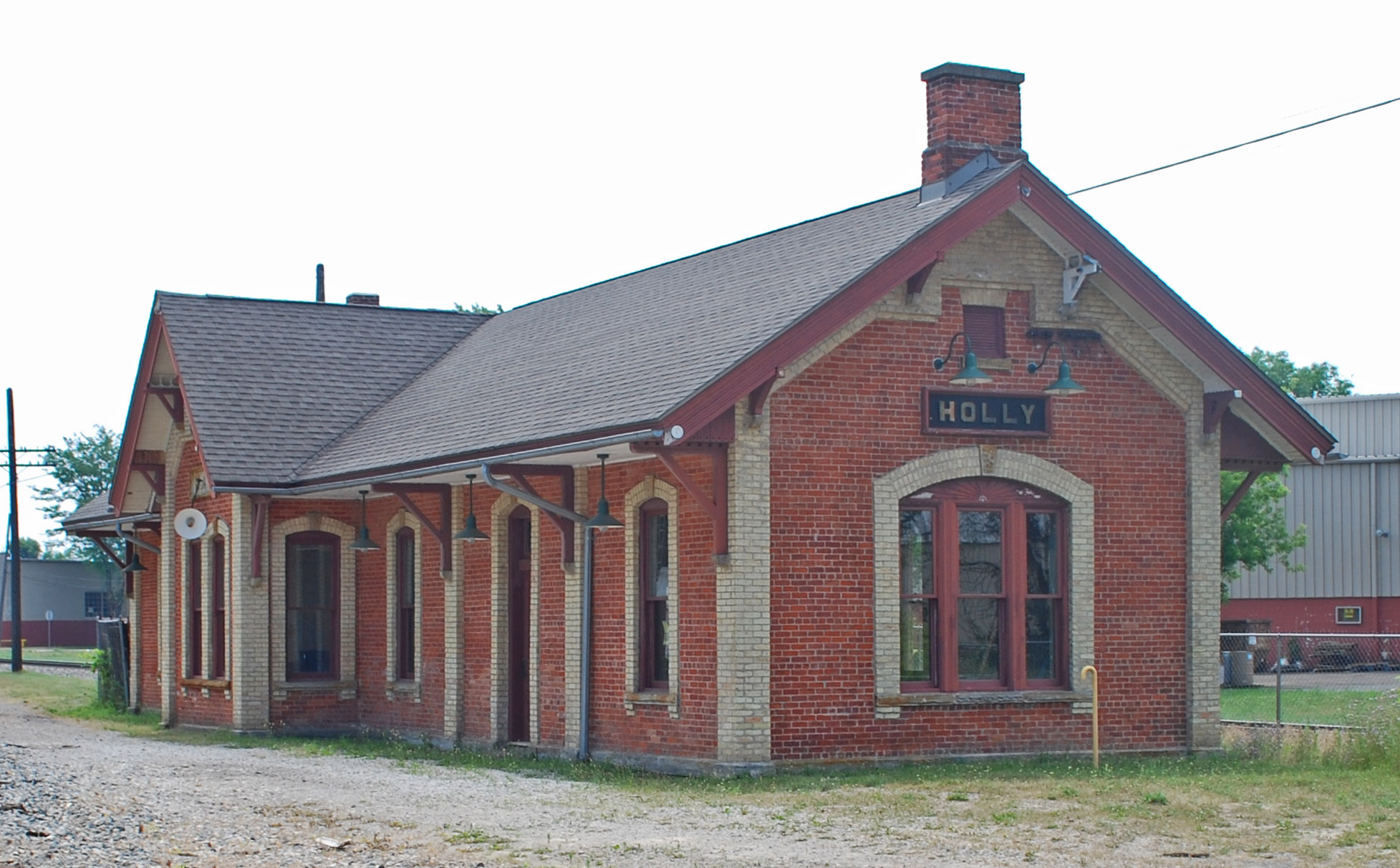
Historic Holly Union Depot, built 1886

Beyond Plymouth the line crosses the now abandoned Michigan Air Line Railroad in Wixom. Then the line continues north. North of Plymouth is the village of Holly, where the line crosses CN's Holly Subdivision near a historic abandoned depot. In Flint, it interchanges with Canadian National's Flint Subdivision at the Atwood Wye. Also in Flint is the McGrew Yard and engine facilities for CSX equipment. In Genesee County, it closely parallels M-54 (Dort Highway) for several miles. Lake State Railway began leasing the line from Plymouth to Mount Morris starting in early March 2019.

== Mount Morris to Saginaw ==
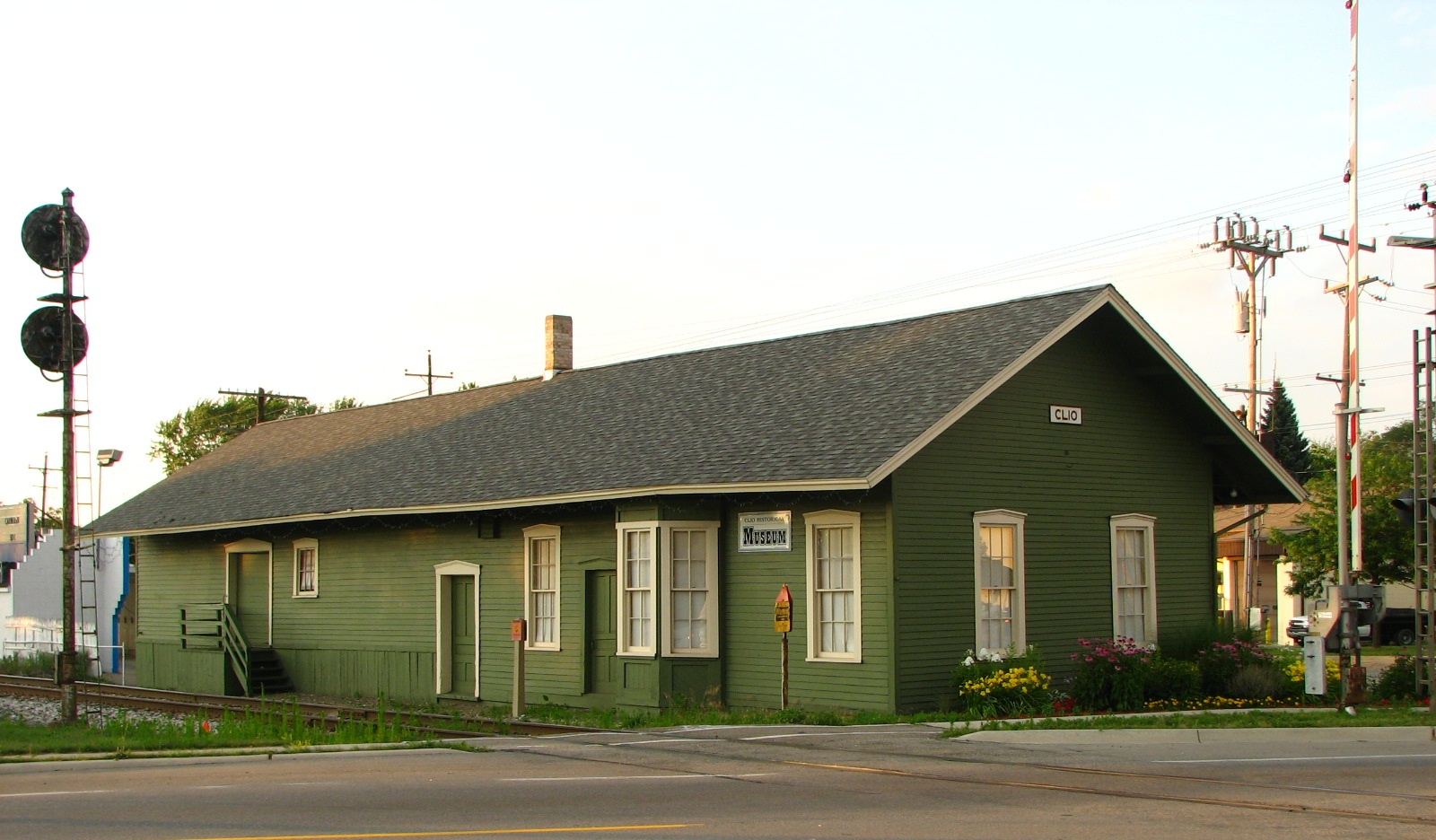
Historic Clio Depot, built 1873

On October 29, 2005, Saginaw Bay Southern Railway (now Lake State Railway) began leasing over 67 miles of CSX Transportation trackage, part of which includes the Saginaw Subdivision from Mount Morris to Saginaw.

== Traffic ==
As with most lines in the Detroit, Michigan, metropolitan area, automobiles are the main source of revenue on the Saginaw Subdivision, although other freight is important for the businesses too. Once a month, a BNSF Railway contracted Powder River Basin coal train works its way up the line. Plus, local freights diverging onto or off the Lincoln Secondary use the Saginaw Sub to head to or from Toledo.

== Passenger service ==
As of 2026, there is no passenger service on the Saginaw Subdivision.

== Pop culture ==
In the computer game series Trainz, the Saginaw Subdivision is available as a user-created route on the Trainz Download Station. In Trainz 2010, it is available as a built-in route.
