= Lincoln Secondary =

The Lincoln Secondary is a railroad line owned and operated by Conrail in the U.S. state of Michigan as part of its Conrail Shared Assets Operations.

The line runs from Carleton northeast to Detroit along a former Pennsylvania Railroad line. Its south end is at the CSX Transportation Saginaw Subdivision, and it mainly serves CSX trains from the south (via Toledo, Ohio) to Detroit. Its north end is at the Ecorse Junction/River Rouge area, where it meets the Conrail Junction Yard Secondary and Norfolk Southern Railway Detroit District.

== History ==
The Pennsylvania Railroad did not have access to Detroit until 1901, when it acquired trackage rights from Toledo over the Michigan Central Railroad and New York Central and Hudson River Railroad (now the Norfolk Southern Detroit Line). However, these rights were cancelled in 1904. The Pennsylvania–Detroit Railroad was incorporated in 1917 to build a line to Detroit. The PRR began building the line, but construction stopped in 1918 because of World War I and the takeover of the national rail system by the United States Railroad Administration.

On May 23, 1920, the PRR began operating passenger trains between Toledo and Detroit, using trackage rights over the Ann Arbor Railroad from the end of PRR trackage near Galena Street in Toledo to Alexis, the Pere Marquette Railway (now CSX Toledo Terminal Subdivision and Saginaw Subdivision) from Alexis past Carleton to Romulus, the Wabash Railway (now NS Detroit District) from Romulus via Ecorse to Delray, and the Detroit Union Railroad Depot and Station Company (now CSX Detroit Subdivision) to the Fort Street Union Depot.

Work on the Pennsylvania–Detroit Railroad, between Carleton and Ecorse, resumed and was completed in 1922; the PRR leased it on January 1, 1923. The P-D merged into the Pennsylvania, Ohio and Detroit Railroad, a PRR subsidiary, on January 1, 1926. The PO&D merged into the Connecting Railway in 1956, and was taken over directly by Conrail in 1976. In the 1999 breakup, it remained part of Conrail's Detroit Shared Assets Area.
