= Detroit and Howell Railroad =

Detroit & Howell Railroad
Overview
- Dates of operation: 1864–1870
- Predecessor: none
- Successor: Detroit, Howell & Lansing

The Detroit and Howell Railroad (D&H) is a defunct railroad organized in 1864 to build a line connecting Howell and Detroit in southeast Michigan.

The company incorporated on June 17, 1864 at a meeting of Howell businessmen in New Hudson, though articles were not filed until September 21. A stock issue of $400,000 was authorized for construction of the proposed 48-mile (77 km) line. By 1866 enough money had been raised to conduct engineering surveys, and grading commenced the following year. The start of construction in Plymouth, Michigan, on February 6, 1867 was marked by a ceremony where a cherry wood tie was fashioned on the spot and laid on the center line of the road. The area was known as Shearers Cut.

By early 1870, the D&H had completed 52 miles (84 km) of line, although it remained unopened.

On March 29, 1870, the D&H merged with the Howell and Lansing to form the Detroit, Howell and Lansing under James F. Joy. The merger agreement was filed April 11, 1870, marking the end of the D&H. However, as of 2011 much of the D&H's route is still in use by CSX as part of its Plymouth Subdivision.
