= Flint and Holly Railroad =

The Flint and Holly Railroad (F&H) is a defunct railroad that operated in eastern Michigan from 1863 to 1868. It was founded by Henry H. Crapo, a Massachusetts-born lumber merchant who served as Governor of Michigan (1865–1869). The line was originally chartered as the Flint and Fentonville Railroad on January 3, 1863, and was amended on October 16, 1863. On November 1, 1864, the F&H completed a railway line from Flint, Michigan to Holly, Michigan. Via an agreement with the Detroit and Milwaukee Railway (D&M), F&H ran into Detroit's Brush Street Station over D&M tracks.

In 1868 the F&H was bought by the Flint and Pere Marquette Railroad (F&PM) and ceased to be an independent company. Henry Crapo's son, William W. Crapo, served an official of F&PM from 1868 until 1903.

The tracks are now part of the CSX Saginaw Subdivision.
