= Howell and Lansing Railroad =

The Howell and Lansing Railroad is a defunct railroad which proposed to construct a railway line between Howell and Lansing in central Michigan. The company incorporated on June 23, 1868 and began grading along the 33-mile (53 km) length of the line. The H&L had some difficulty obtaining financing; by the time it merged with the Detroit and Howell on March 29, 1870, no track had been laid. The two companies merged formed the Detroit, Howell and Lansing, and the H&L ceased to exist as an independent company.
