= Tip of The Thumb Heritage Water Trail =

Nonprofit organization

The Tip of The Thumb Heritage Water Trails is a nonprofit citizens organization working with the Huron County Parks to establish and maintain a water trail along Michigan's Lake Huron's shoreline. It is dependent on public support for its existence and growth. The Water Trail, which is best utilized via sea kayaks by people who have had proper sea kayaking instruction, consists of camp sites and rest areas spaced out along the shore. The trail is still being developed, so there are several large sections with no public landing sites.

== Location ==
Some of the important locations are

- Western terminus at Quanicassee River Public Access 43°35′05.0″N 83°40′50.9″W
- White Rock Roadside Park 43°43′02.4″N 82°36′34.1″W
- Southern Terminus in Lexington 43°16′03.6″N 82°31′34.0″W

== Water trails ==
Water trails are routes on navigable waterways such as rivers, lakes, and canals for people using small non-motorized boats such as kayaks, canoes, rafts, or rowboats. The trails are designed and implemented to foster an interactive historical educational experience. A guide provides a more detailed presentation of the historic material in addition to acting as a more conventional water trail guide with maps, put-in points, take-out points, rest stop locations, water, and paddling conditions.

== Huron County ==
Huron County, located in the Thumb area of the Lower Peninsula of Michigan, is made up of 27 townships and an area of about 480,000 acres (1,900 km^{2}). It is surrounded on three sides by Lake Huron and Saginaw Bay, which meet at the north. To its south are Sanilac and Tuscola counties. The Cass, Pinnebog, Sebewaing, and Pigeon rivers all head toward the center of the county and empty into Saginaw Bay. Willow Creek, farther on the east side of the county, empties into Lake Huron.

Drift soil composed of a mixture of clay, sand, and gravel is adapted to the growth of plants and fruit. It is easily tilled, holds moisture well, and allows for proper drainage. This also made Huron County popular.
