= Holly, Michigan =

Village in Oakland County, Michigan, United States

- Village
- Village of Holly
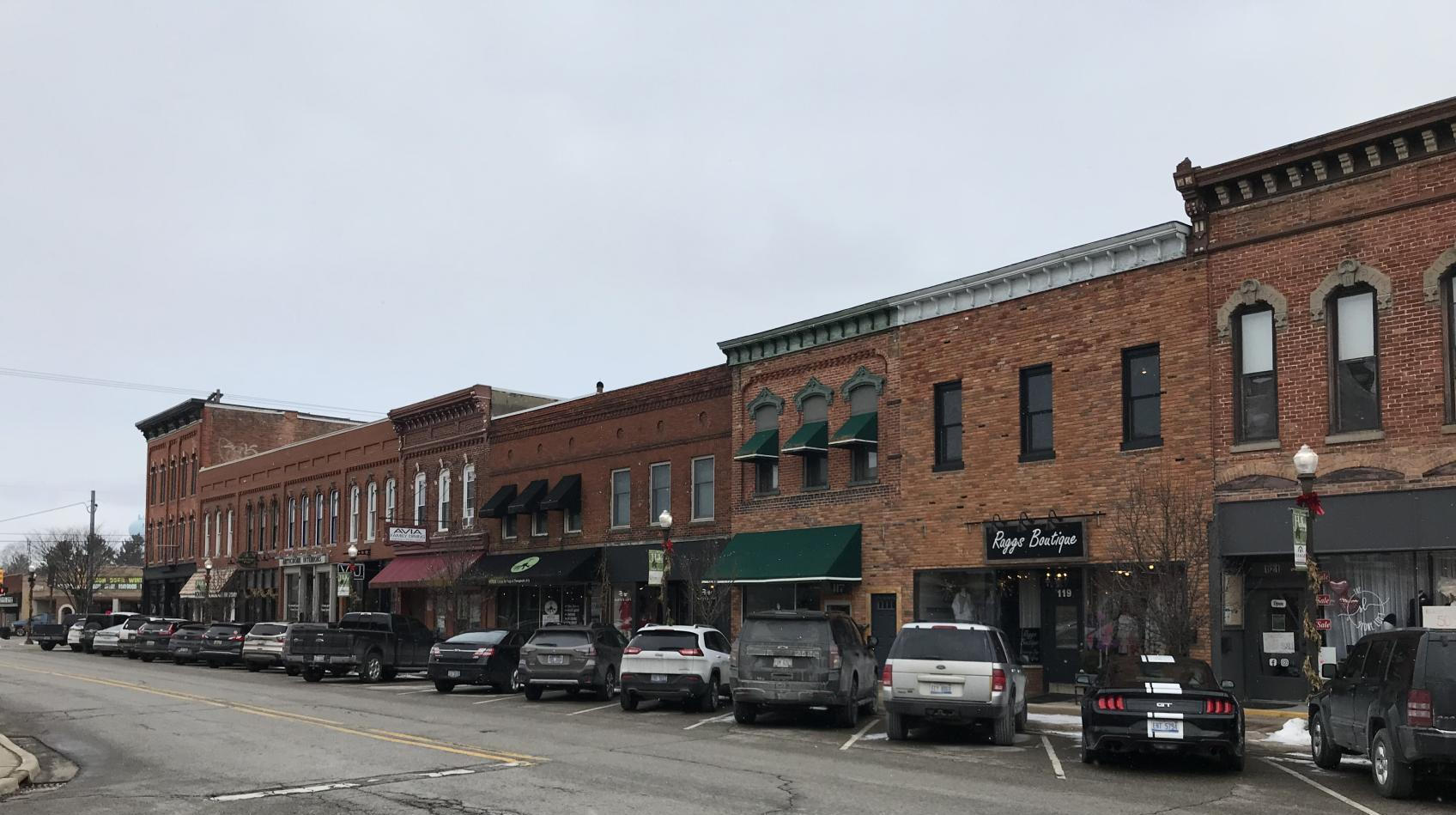
- Downtown Holly Commercial District
- Motto(s): Hometown feel, timeless appeal
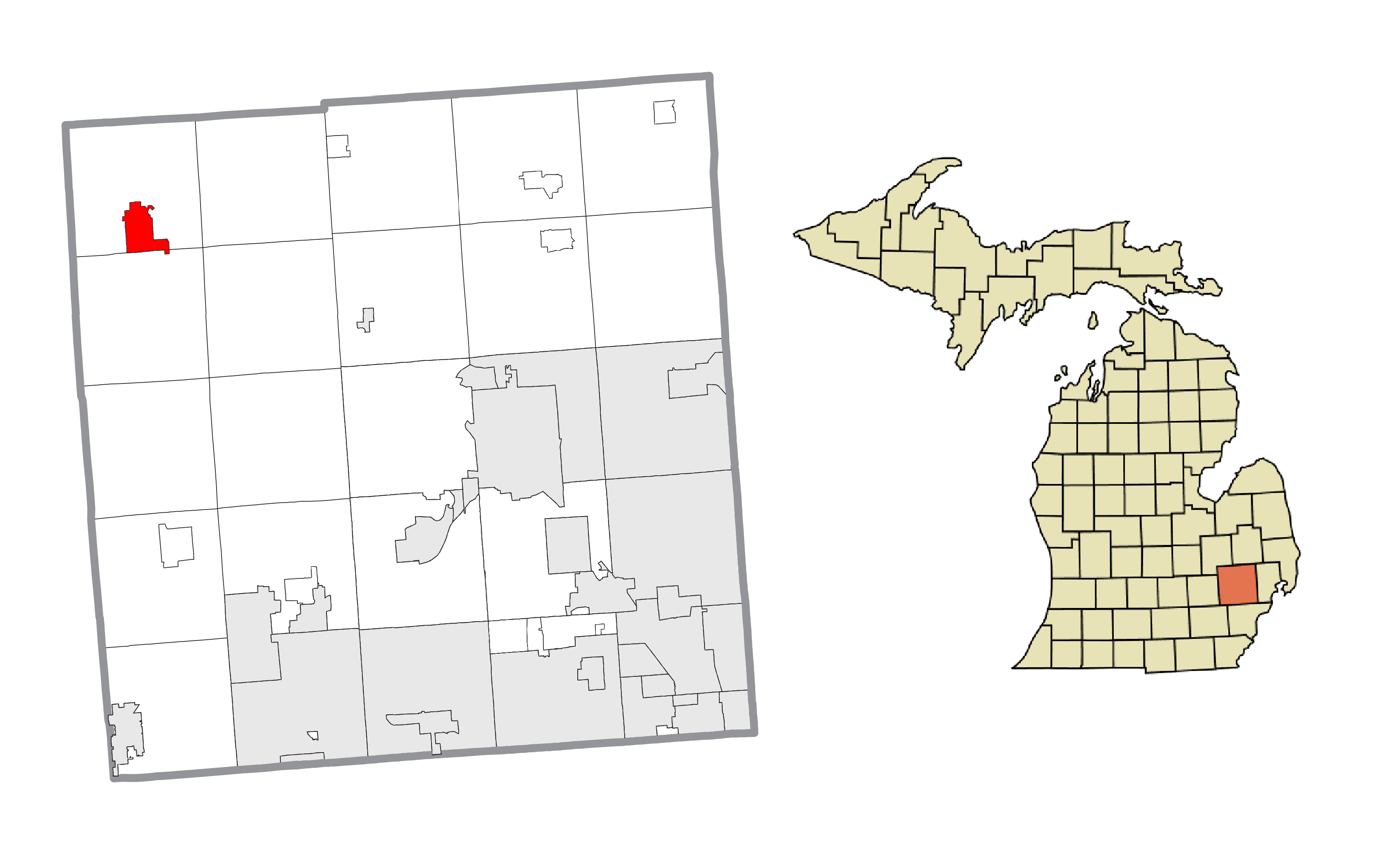
- Location within Oakland County

- Location within the state of Michigan
- Coordinates: 42°47′31″N 83°37′40″W
- Country: United States
- State: Michigan
- County: Oakland
- Township: Holly
- Incorporated: 1865

Government
  - Type: Council-Manager
  - President: April Brandon (D)

Area
  - Total: 3.12 sq mi (8.09 km^{2})
  - Land: 2.83 sq mi (7.33 km^{2})
  - Water: 0.29 sq mi (0.76 km^{2}) 9.21%
- Elevation: 928 ft (283 m)

Population (2020)
  - Total: 5,997
  - Density: 2,118.2/sq mi (817.86/km^{2})
- Time zone: UTC-5 (EST)
  - Summer (DST): UTC-4 (EDT)
- ZIP code(s): 48442
- Area code: 248
- FIPS code: 26-38700
- GNIS feature ID: 0628441
- Website: Official website

Holly is a village in north Oakland County, Michigan, United States. The population was 5,997 at the 2020 census. The village is located within Holly Township. It is about 15 miles (24 km) south of Flint and 55 miles (89 km) northwest of Detroit.

== Geography ==
According to the United States Census Bureau, the village has a total area of 3.04 sq mi (7.87 km^{2}), of which 2.76 sq mi (7.15 km^{2}) (90.79%) is land and 0.28 sq mi (0.73 km^{2}) (9.21%) is water.

== Demographics ==
Historical population
Census	Pop.	Note	%±
1860	542		—
1870	1,429		163.7%
1880	1,443		1.0%
1890	1,266		−12.3%
1900	1,419		12.1%
1910	1,537		8.3%
1920	1,888		22.8%
1930	2,252		19.3%
1940	2,343		4.0%
1950	2,663		13.7%
1960	3,269		22.8%
1970	4,355		33.2%
1980	4,874		11.9%
1990	5,595		14.8%
2000	6,135		9.7%
2010	6,086		−0.8%
2020	5,997		−1.5%
U.S. Decennial Census

=== 2020 census ===
As of the 2020 census, Holly had a population of 5,997. There were 2,534 households, including 1,514 family households, in the village. The median age was 38.8 years. 22.2% of residents were under the age of 18 and 16.0% of residents were 65 years of age or older. For every 100 females there were 95.5 males, and for every 100 females age 18 and over there were 92.1 males age 18 and over.

98.9% of residents lived in urban areas, while 1.1% lived in rural areas.

Of all households, 28.7% had children under the age of 18 living in them. 40.6% were married-couple households, 20.8% were households with a male householder and no spouse or partner present, and 29.8% were households with a female householder and no spouse or partner present. About 32.2% of all households were made up of individuals, and 13.7% had someone living alone who was 65 years of age or older.

There were 2,683 housing units, of which 5.6% were vacant. The homeowner vacancy rate was 1.0% and the rental vacancy rate was 7.5%.

Racial composition as of the 2020 census
Race	Number	Percent
White	5,425	90.5%
Black or African American	87	1.5%
American Indian and Alaska Native	21	0.4%
Asian	24	0.4%
Native Hawaiian and Other Pacific Islander	0	0.0%
Some other race	35	0.6%
Two or more races	405	6.8%
Hispanic or Latino (of any race)	263	4.4%

=== 2010 census ===
As of the census of 2010, there were 6,086 people, 2,453 households, and 1,538 families living in the village. The population density was 2,205.1 inhabitants per square mile (851.4/km^{2}). There were 2,703 housing units at an average density of 979.3 per square mile (378.1/km^{2}). The racial makeup of the village was 95.0% White, 1.2% African American, 0.6% Native American, 0.6% Asian, 0.8% from other races, and 1.9% from two or more races. Hispanic or Latino of any race were 3.6% of the population.

There were 2,453 households, of which 34.5% had children under the age of 18 living with them, 43.7% were married couples living together, 13.1% had a female householder with no husband present, 5.9% had a male householder with no wife present, and 37.3% were non-families. 30.9% of all households were made up of individuals, and 12.9% had someone living alone who was 65 years of age or older. The average household size was 2.45 and the average family size was 3.09.

The median age in the village was 36.3 years. 25.5% of residents were under the age of 18; 8.2% were between the ages of 18 and 24; 28.8% were from 25 to 44; 24.9% were from 45 to 64; and 12.5% were 65 years of age or older. The gender makeup of the village was 48.7% male and 51.3% female.

=== 2000 census ===
As of the census of 2000, there were 6,135 people, 2,412 households, and 1,565 families living in the village. The population density was 2,204.6 inhabitants per square mile (851.2/km^{2}). There were 2,509 housing units at an average density of 901.6 per square mile (348.1/km^{2}). The racial makeup of the village was 95.14% White, 1.29% African American, 0.44% Native American, 0.41% Asian, 0.02% Pacific Islander, 1.01% from other races, and 1.70% from two or more races. Hispanic or Latino of any race were 3.31% of the population.

There were 2,412 households, out of which 34.7% had children under the age of 18 living with them, 48.5% were married couples living together, 11.2% had a female householder with no husband present, and 35.1% were non-families. 28.7% of all households were made up of individuals, and 12.2% had someone living alone who was 65 years of age or older. The average household size was 2.49 and the average family size was 3.10.

In the village, the population was spread out, with 27.0% under the age of 18, 8.3% from 18 to 24, 35.6% from 25 to 44, 17.8% from 45 to 64, and 11.3% who were 65 years of age or older. The median age was 33 years. For every 100 females, there were 96.4 males. For every 100 females age 18 and over, there were 93.0 males.

The median income for a household in the village was $46,436, and the median income for a family was $54,344. Males had a median income of $42,037 versus $27,078 for females. The per capita income for the village was $19,988. About 4.3% of families and 7.3% of the population were below the poverty line, including 6.3% of those under age 18 and 14.3% of those age 65 or over.

== Education ==
As at February 2024, Holly Academy was a K-8 charter school with a roll of 586, authorized and supported by Central Michigan University.

== Tourism ==
Holly is the site of the Annual Holly Dickens Festival, as well as the Michigan Renaissance Festival, which was the main shooting location for the romantic comedy film All's Faire in Love (2009).

Holly is the starting point of the Shiawassee River Heritage Water Trail at WaterWorks Park.

Mount Holly, a large ski/snowboard resort in southeastern Michigan, is located 3 miles (5 km) northeast of the village in Groveland Township. Nearby is the state-owned Holly Recreation Area.

Crapo Park, named after Michigan Governor Henry H. Crapo (1804–1869), located near the junction of the CSX Saginaw Subdivision and Canadian National Railway's Holly Subdivision, is a popular viewing location for railfans. Both lines were formerly served by Holly's small (now abandoned) Holly Union Depot, built-in 1886. A nonprofit group is currently attempting to restore the neglected building to its former glory.

The town of Holly was featured as a campaign stop in the Clint Eastwood political action thriller film In The Line Of Fire (1993).

== News and media ==
Holly is served by the Tri-County Times for print news and the Oakland County Times for online news.

== Notable people ==
- Andrew Anderson, professional ten-pin bowler on the PBA Tour
- Stan Boyd, racing driver
- James E. Church Jr., who developed the Mount Rose snow sampler
- Karl W. Richter, Vietnam War Air Force pilot who, at 23, became the youngest pilot in that conflict to shoot down a MiG in air-to-air combat, and awarded numerous medals for valor including the Air Force Cross, Distinguished Flying Cross and Purple Heart
- Elissa Slotkin, former Congresswoman for Michigan's 7th congressional district and current U.S. Senator from Michigan

== Gallery ==
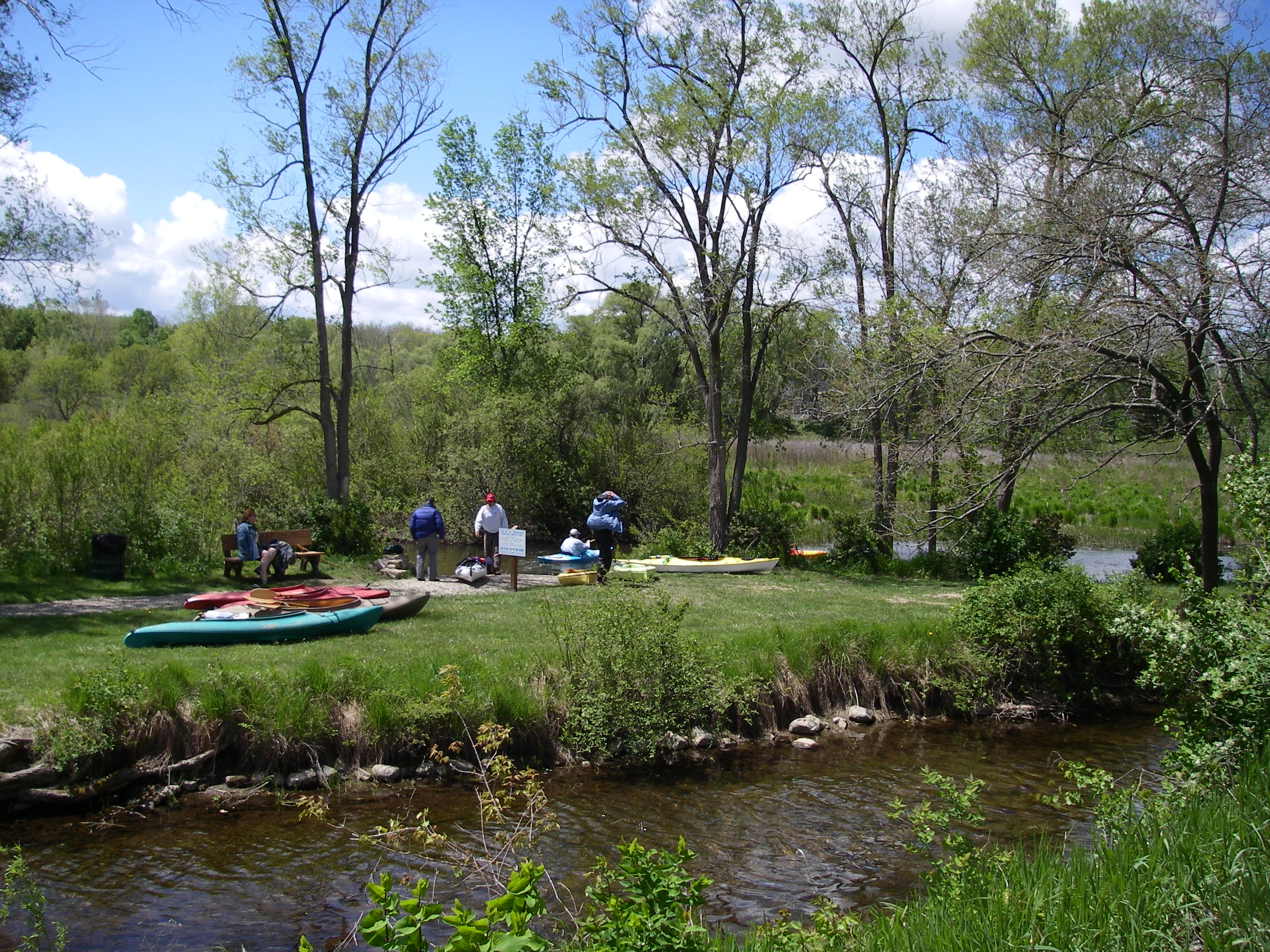
Canoe and kayak launch site for Shiawassee River at WaterWorks Park

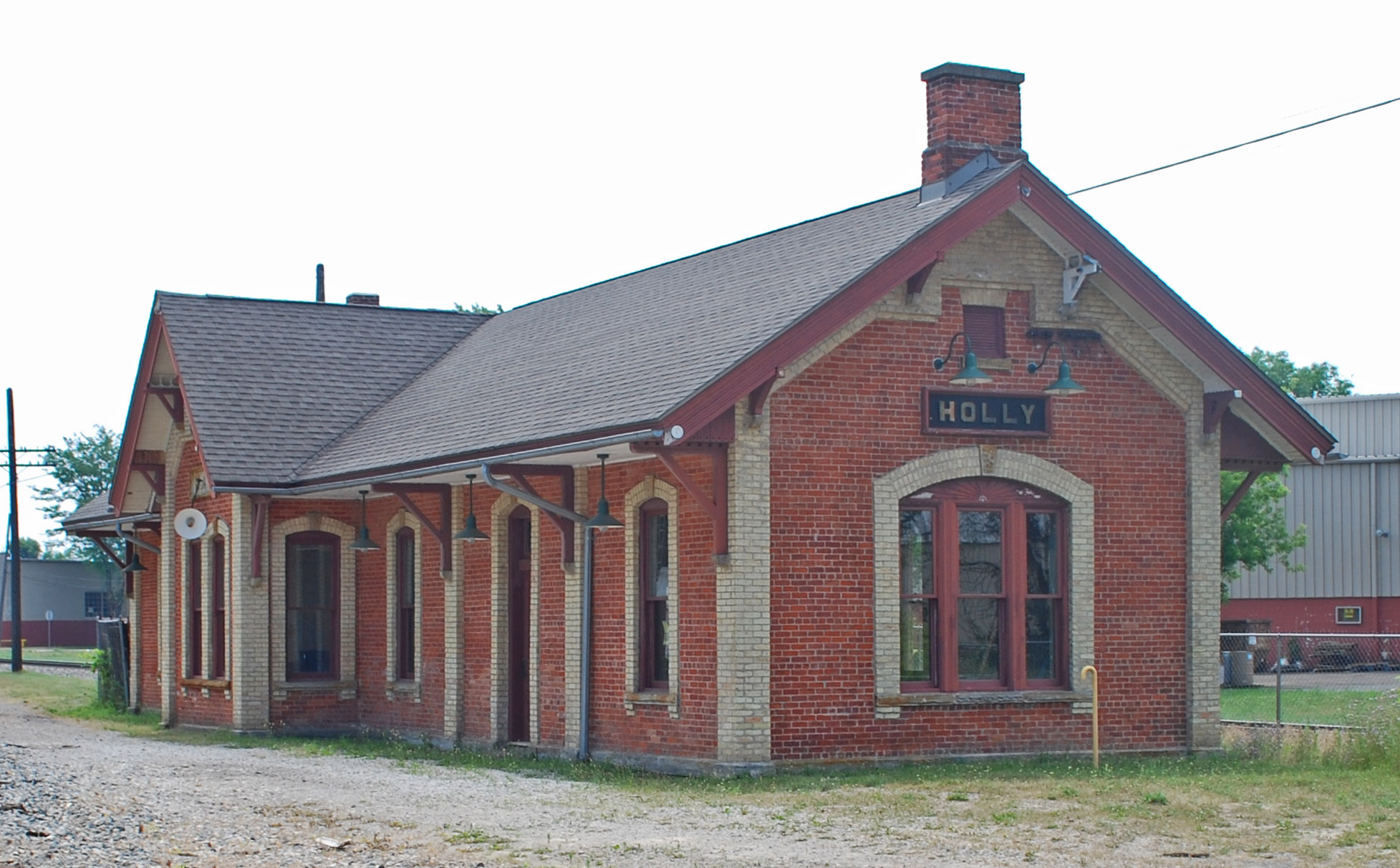
Historic Holly Union Depot, built 1886

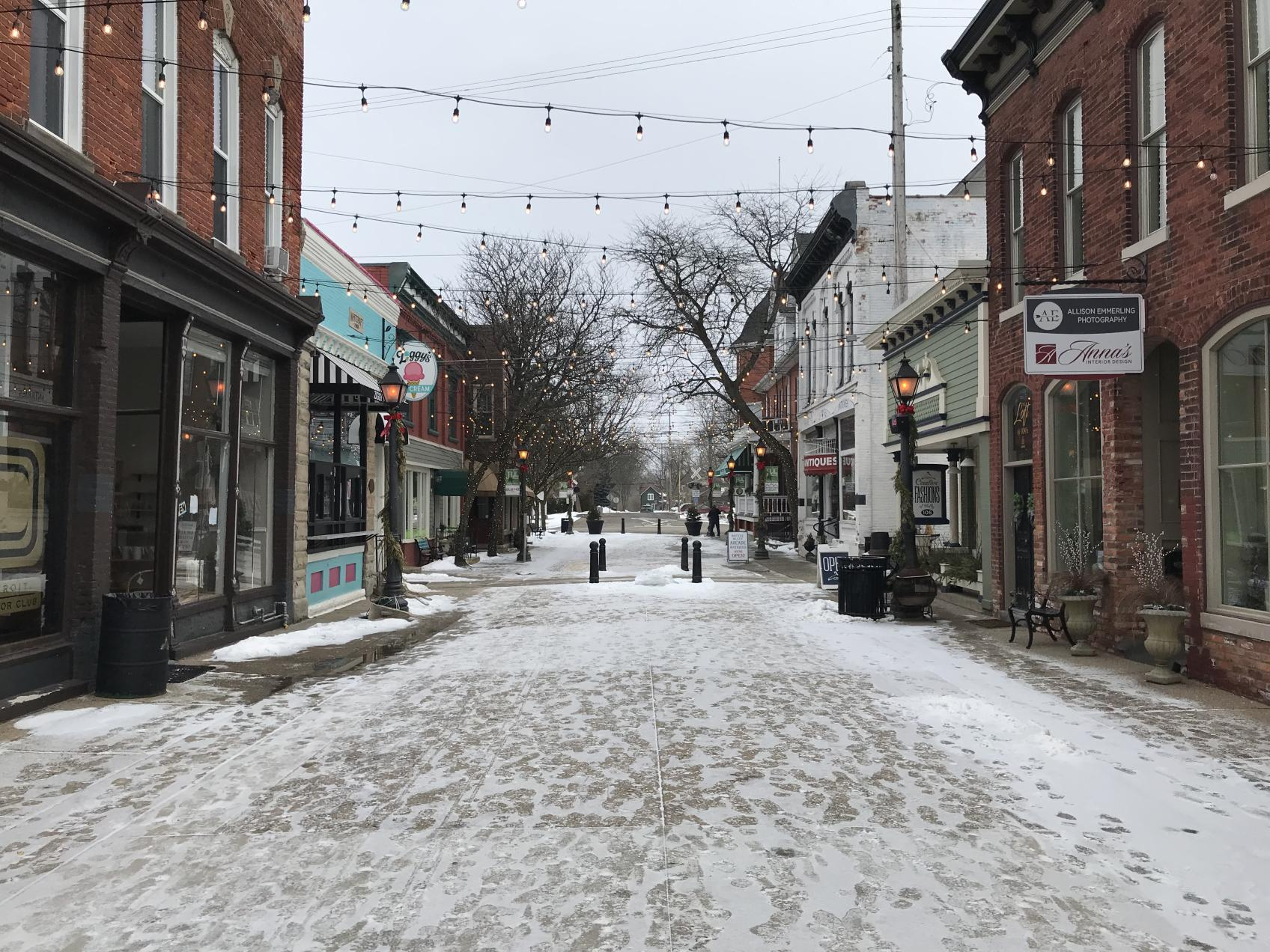
Battle Alley

== See also ==
- List of municipalities in Michigan
