= K27 =

K27 or K-27 may refer to:

- K-27 (Kansas highway)
- HMS Honeysuckle (K27), a corvette of the Royal Navy
- Kandi K27, a Chinese city car
- Rio Grande class K-27, an American steam locomotive
- Sonata in G, K. 27, by Wolfgang Amadeus Mozart
- Soviet submarine K-27
- K27/28 Beijing-Dandong-Pyongyang through train
