= Saginaw and Mount Pleasant Railroad =

Railroad in Michigan

Overview
- Locale: Central Michigan
- Dates of operation: 1879–1889
- Successor: Flint and Pere Marquette Railroad

Technical
- Track gauge: 4 ft 8 1/2 in (1,435 mm)
- Previous gauge: 3 ft (914 mm)
- Length: 14.7 miles (23.7 km)

The Saginaw and Mount Pleasant Railroad was a wholly owned subsidiary of the Flint and Pere Marquette Railroad (F&PM). It was established to construct a 14.7-mile (23.7 km) railway line from a junction with the F&PM main line at Coleman, Michigan, to Mount Pleasant, Michigan. The line opened on December 15, 1879, as a 3 ft (914 mm) narrow gauge line. In mid-1884 the line was converted to 4 ft 8 1/2 in (1,435 mm) standard gauge. On January 31, 1889 the company was formally merged into the F&PM along with the East Saginaw and St. Clair Railroad, the Saginaw and Clare County Railroad, and the Manistee Railroad.

In 1979 the C&O abandoned the line.
