= Rio Grande 463 =

Preserved 2-8-2 "Mikado" steam locomotive

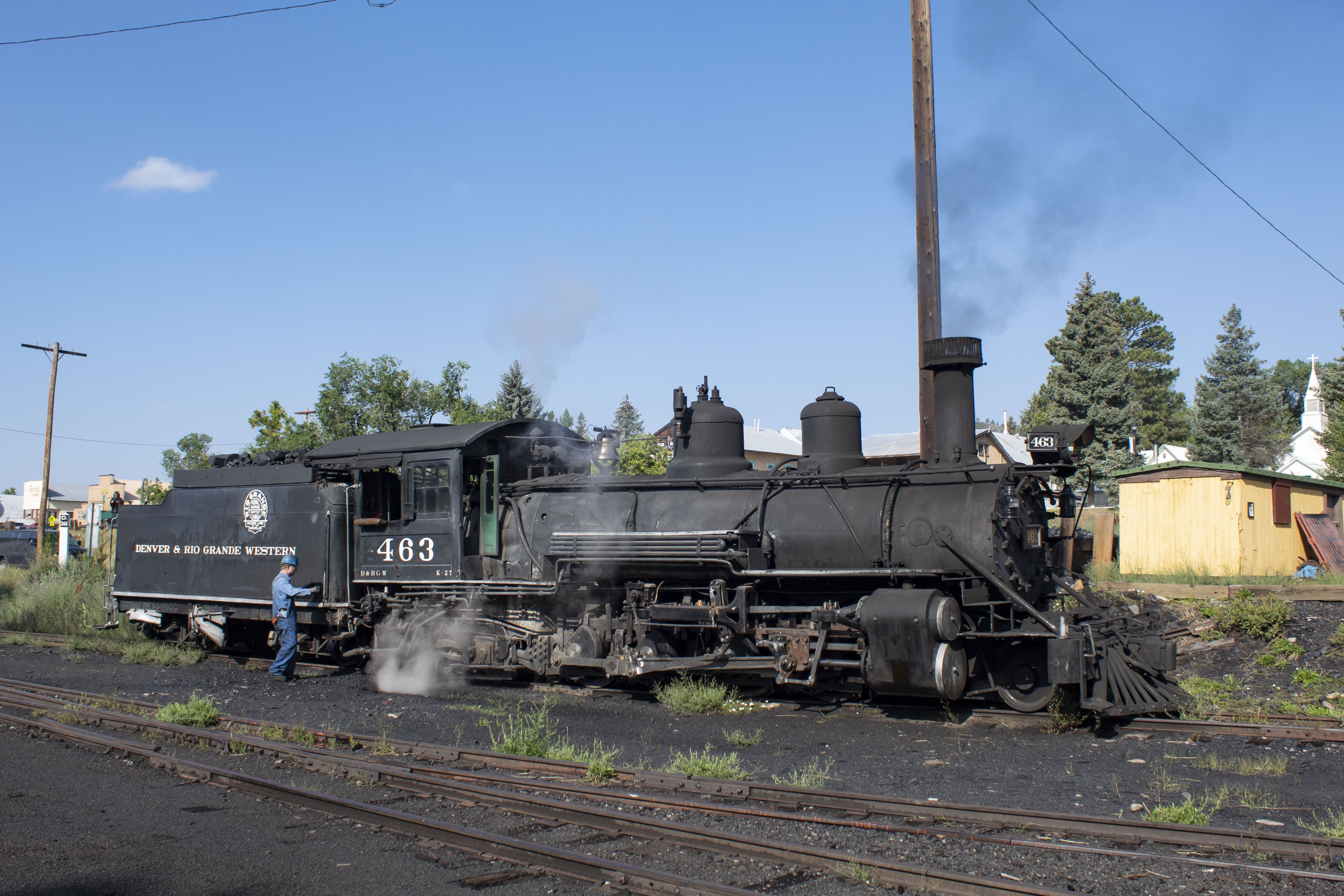
- 463 on the Cumbres and Toltec in 2021
Type and origin
- Power type: Steam
- Builder: Baldwin Locomotive Works
- Serial number: 21788
- Build date: March 1903
Specifications
- Configuration
  - Whyte: 2-8-2
  - UIC: 1′D1′ v, later 1′D1′ h
- Gauge: 3 ft (914 mm)
- Leading dia.: 28 in (711 mm)
- Driver dia.: 40 in (1,016 mm)
- Trailing dia.: 28 in (711 mm)
- Wheelbase: 24.5 ft (7.47 m)
- Length: 33.7 ft (10.27 m)
- Adhesive weight: 105,425 lb (47,820 kg; 48 t)
- Loco weight: 136,650 lb (61,983 kg; 62 t)
- Fuel type: Coal
- Superheater: Yes, later
- Cylinders: Original: Four Vauclain compound; Later: Two, simple
- Cylinder size: Original: 13 in × 22 in (330 mm × 559 mm) and 22 in × 22 in (559 mm × 559 mm); Later: 17 in × 22 in (432 mm × 559 mm)
- Valve gear: Walschaerts
- Valve type: Original: slide valves; Later: piston valves
- Loco brake: Air
- Train brakes: Air
- Couplers: Knuckle
Performance figures
- Tractive effort: 27,000 lbf (120 kN)
Career
- Operators: Denver and Rio Grande Railroad; Denver and Rio Grande Western Railroad; Cumbres and Toltec Scenic Railroad
- Class: D&RG: 125; D&RGW: K-27
- Number in class: 14 of 15
- Numbers: D&RG 463; D&RGW 463; C&TSRR 463; RGS 455
- Nicknames: Mudhen
- Retired: 1955
- Restored: 1994
- Current owner: Cumbres and Toltec Scenic Railroad
- Disposition: Operational
- Engine No. 463
- U.S. National Register of Historic Places
- Colorado State Register of Historic Properties
- Location within New Mexico Location within the United States
- Location: C&TS shops, Chama, New Mexico
- Coordinates: 36°54′10.4″N 106°34′40.7″W
- Area: 0 acres (0 ha)
- Built: 1903
- Architect: Baldwin Locomotive Works
- NRHP reference No.: 75000502
- CSRHP No.: 5CN.68
- Added to NRHP: May 12, 1975

Cumbres and Toltec Scenic Railroad 463 is a 3-foot narrow-gauge K-27 class 2-8-2 "Mikado" type steam locomotive built for the Denver and Rio Grande Railroad (D&RG) by the Baldwin Locomotive Works (BLW) in March 1903. It is one of two remaining Rio Grande K-27 locomotives, the other one being No. 464 at the Huckleberry Railroad in Genesee Township, Michigan. The class eventually became known by the nickname "Mudhens". Today, No. 463 is operational on the Cumbres and Toltec Scenic Railroad between Chama, New Mexico and Antonito, Colorado.

Fifteen locomotives were built, originally class 125, then reclassified K-27 in 1924 when the D&RG became the Denver and Rio Grande Western Railroad (D&RGW). The K-27s were built as Vauclain compounds, with two cylinders on each side, expanding the steam once in the smaller cylinder and then a second time in the larger one. The extra maintenance costs of the two cylinders were greater than the fuel saving, so they were converted to simple expansion in 1907–1909. They were Rio Grande's last purchase of compound locomotives. They pulled freight, passenger and mixed trains on the D&RGW in and over the Colorado Rocky Mountains, traversing the entire length of the railroad. They were built with their main structural frames outside the driving wheels, with the counterweights and rods attached outside the frames.

No. 463 was sold to cowboy actor and singer Gene Autry in May 1955. Autry never used the engine and donated it to the town of Antonito, Colorado. It was restored by and entered into service on the Cumbres and Toltec Scenic Railroad in 1994. It was taken out of service with a broken side rod in late 2002. In 2009, it was moved to the railroad's shop at Chama, New Mexico where a major rebuild was taken until completion in Spring 2013. On May 20, 2013, the locomotive returned to service and made its inaugural run on the C&TSRR.

No. 463 was added to the National Register of Historic Places in 1975 as Engine No. 463.

== See also ==
- Rio Grande 168
- Rio Grande 169
- Rio Grande 223
- Rio Grande 278
- Rio Grande 315
