= K28 =

K28 may refer to:

- K-28 (Kansas highway)
- K-28 trailer, part of the SCR-268 radar system
- Rio Grande class K-28, an American steam locomotive
- Sonata in C, K. 28, by Wolfgang Amadeus Mozart
- K27/28 Beijing-Dandong-Pyongyang through train
