= D3D =

D3D may refer to:

- DIII-D (tokamak) (pronounced 'D3D'), a tokamak located at San Diego, California
- Direct3D, Microsoft's graphics rendering scheme
- Dolby 3D
- Duke Nukem 3D or Duke3d, a first person shooter video game from 1996
- China Railways HXD3D, a type of electric locomotive in China
