= Crossroads Village =

Crossroads Village and Huckleberry Railroad
- Established: July 4, 1976
- Location: Genesee Township, Michigan, US
- Coordinates: 43°05′33″N 83°39′01″W
- Type: Living museum
- Manager: Scott Burnett
- Owners: Genesee County Parks & Recreation Commission
- Website: geneseecountyparks.org/crossroads-village/

Crossroads Village is a living history museum in Genesee County, Michigan, near Flint. It is operated by the Genesee County Parks and Recreation Commission alongside the Huckleberry Railroad. Initially proposed as a Flint River recreational area and a farm museum, it was opened as a historical village in 1976.

Crossroads Village is home to 34 buildings, many which are restored 19th-century buildings, as well as amusement rides, a narrow-gauge railroad, and a replica paddlewheel steamboat. It also hosts numerous events and festivals throughout the year. The village is located at 6140 Bray Road in Genesee Township.

== History ==
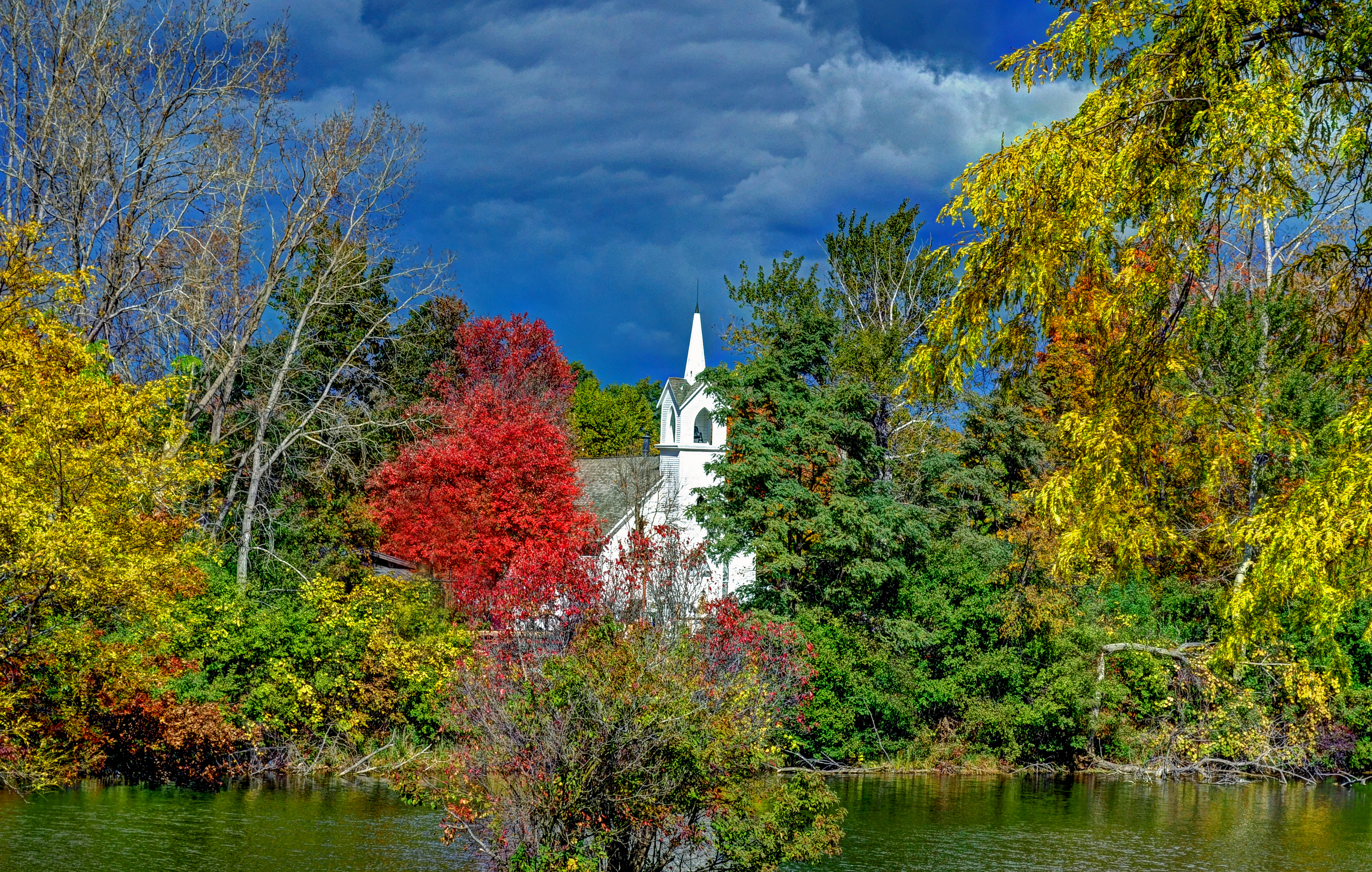
Church at Crossroads Village

The City of Flint drew up a master plan in 1950 that included an upstream Flint River recreational area. In 1965, the Charles Stewart Mott Foundation offered land-purchasing financial assistance with conditions, including establishing a commission. Thus, Genesee County formed its Parks and Recreation Commission the following year.

A farm museum was proposed for the area. Additionally, residents concerned about the loss of historical buildings as the county developed met to discuss the issue. The farm museum would have a historical village adjacent to it with donated buildings moved there. Crossroads Village and the Huckleberry Railroad opened on July 4, 1976.

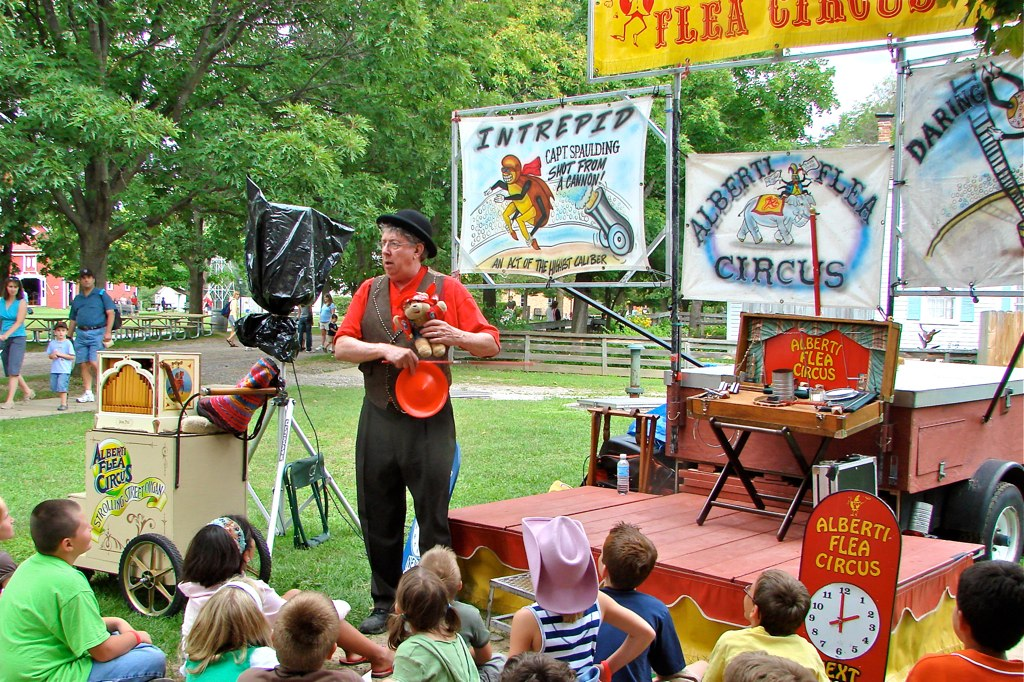
Alberti Flea Circus at Crossroads Village

Starting in 2018, the Sloan Auto Fair was moved from the Flint Cultural Center to the village due to the Flint Institute of Arts' expansion.

On April 23, 2020, Genesee County Parks Director Barry June announced that Crossroads Village and the Huckleberry Railroad would not open for the 2020 summer season due to the ongoing coronavirus pandemic. A late opening was planned in October 2020. It was the first time that the park had been forced to delay opening since it was first opened in 1976.

== Attractions ==
Crossroads Village is home to 34 buildings, many which are restored 19th-century buildings: it includes the oldest operating gristmill in Michigan as well as a barbershop, blacksmith shop, cider mill, and general store. The T.N. North and Son Bank was moved from Vassar and the town hall was moved from Clayton Township.

Crossroads Village is also home to amusement rides, the narrow-gauge Huckleberry Railroad, and replica paddlewheel steamboat Genesee Bell, the latter of which both operate along Mott Lake.

Amusement rides at Crossroads Village include a C.W. Parker Superior Wheel (a Ferris wheel) built in 1910, a C. W. Parker carousel built in 1912, Venetian swings, and pony carts. The carousel was built in Leavenworth, Kansas, installed in California for 30 years, and purchased by a private collector in Michigan before it was acquired by Crossroads Village with a $175,000 grant from the Charles Stewart Mott Foundation in 1983. In 2010, Michigan History magazine named the carousel the "happiest place in Genesee County".

=== Huckleberry Railroad ===
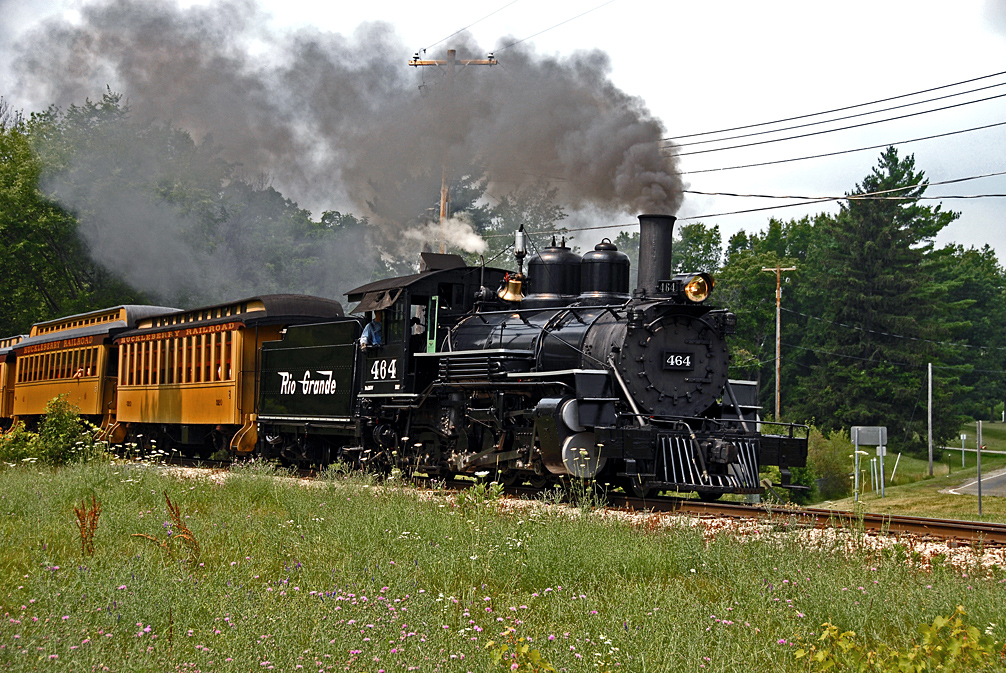
Ex-D&RGW #464 on the Huckleberry Railroad

The Huckleberry Railroad is a narrow-gauge railroad that runs from Crossroads Village alongside Mott Lake on former Pere Marquette track. The railroad has 11 wooden coaches, a caboose, and two steam locomotives: former Alaska Railroad Baldwin 4-6-0 #152 and former Denver and Rio Grande Western Railroad K-27 class #464.

== Events ==
Major events held at Crossroads Village include 19th-century "school days" field trips for students and teachers at Stanley Schoolhouse (which dates to 1883), an annual Labor Day picnic and parade, a Railfans Weekend, Halloween and Christmas festivities in the village, and Day out with Thomas train excursions (since 2006). Since 2018, Crossroads Village is also the location of the Sloan Museum Auto Fair, which was previously held at the Sloan Museum in the Flint Cultural Center.

== In media ==
In 2009, Crossroads Village was the set for the feature film Alleged, which is based on the 1925 Scopes trial. It starred Brian Dennehy as defense attorney Clarence Darrow and Fred Thompson as prosecutor William Jennings Bryan.

== See also ==
- The Henry Ford
