= Flint River Railroad =

The Flint River Railroad is a defunct railroad. It was established on December 6, 1871, to construct a 14.4-mile (23.2 km) branch from Horton to Otter Lake to support the logging industry in the Flint River area. This line was opened on October 8, 1872, and the company was consolidated with the Flint and Pere Marquette Railroad (F&PM). In 1881 the F&PM extended this line 5.2 miles (8.4 km) to Fostoria.

The successor to the F&PM, the Pere Marquette Railway, abandoned the segment between Fostoria and Otisville, a distance of 9.8 miles (15.8 km), in 1933. The C&O abandoned the remainder in 1972. A section of the line is now operated by the heritage Huckleberry Railroad.
