= Monroe and Toledo Railway =

The Monroe and Toledo Railway is a defunct railroad which operated in southeast Michigan during the mid-1890s. The company was chartered on March 29, 1893, to construct a line from the Flint and Pere Marquette Railroad's Monroe terminal to the Ohio border, just north of Toledo. On November 15, 1896, the M&T completed a line from Monroe to Alexis, north of Toledo. In 1897 the F&PM purchased the M&T outright.
