= Bay City and East Saginaw Railroad =

The Bay City and East Saginaw Railroad is a defunct railroad which operated in central Michigan before being bought by the Flint and Pere Marquette Railroad (F&PM). The company was chartered on April 8, 1864, and on November 1, 1867, completed a 13-mile (21 km) railway line from East Saginaw, Michigan to Bay City. In 1868 the F&PM leased the line; in 1872 it bought the company outright.
