= Huckleberry Railroad =

Heritage railway in Michigan, United States

Coordinates: 43.09336°N 83.65137°W

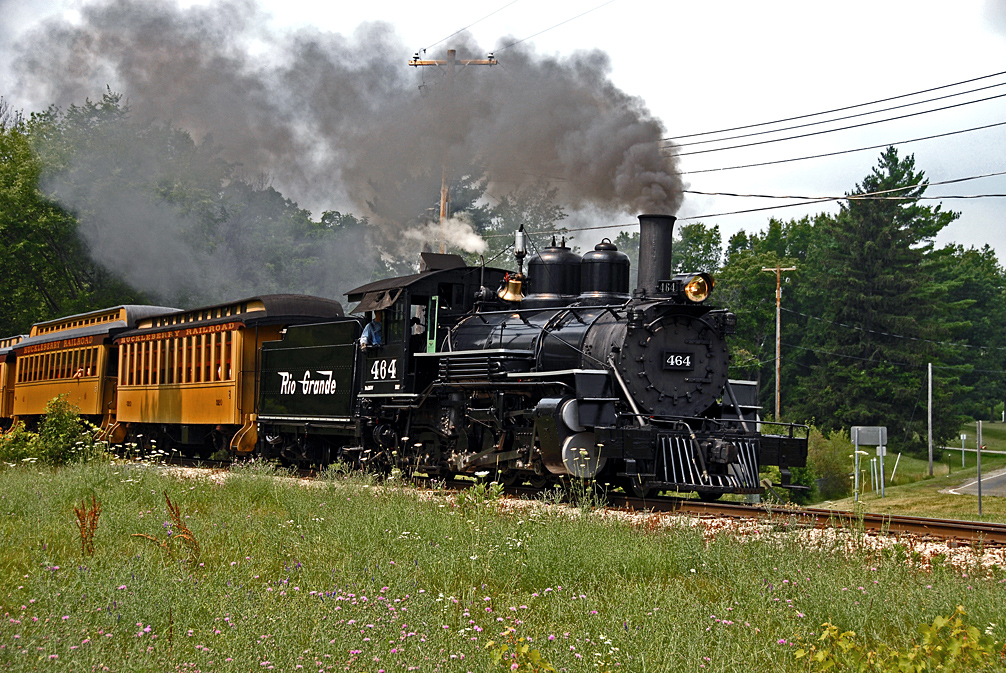

Overview
- Headquarters: Crossroads Village, a county park in Genesee Township, Michigan
- Reporting mark: HRR
- Locale: Genesee Township, Michigan
- Dates of operation: 1976–present

Technical
- Track gauge: 3 ft (914 mm)

Other
- Website: geneseecountyparks.org/huckleberry-railroad/

The Huckleberry Railroad is a 3 ft (914 mm) narrow gauge heritage railroad located in Genesee Township, Michigan, near Flint. The railroad operates alongside Crossroads Village, both of which are owned and maintained by the Genesee County Parks and Recreation Commission.

The railroad received its name due to the story that a person could jump off the train, pick wild huckleberries, and re-board the train without difficulty, as it traveled so slowly.

== History ==
What is now the Huckleberry Railroad began operating in 1872 as part of the Flint River Railroad. The Flint and Pere Marquette Railroad later extended the branch line from Flint to Otter Lake. It later came to be known as the Otter Lake Branch. Eventually the track was extended by another 4.5 miles (7.2 km) from Otter Lake to Fostoria, for a total of 19.5 miles (31.4 km) from Flint to Fostoria.

The Pere Marquette Railway abandoned the Otter Lake to Fostoria line in 1932, and the Otisville to Otter Lake line a year later. The Huckleberry Railroad began operations in 1976 on the remaining line when the Genesee County Parks and Recreation Commission opened Crossroads Village.

The train station used by the Huckleberry Railroad at Crossroads Village is the former Grand Trunk Western Railroad station from nearby Davison.

On April 23, 2020, Genesee County Parks Director Barry June announced that the railroad and Crossroads Village would not open for the 2020 summer season due to the ongoing COVID-19 pandemic. A late opening was planned in October 2020. It was the first time that the attraction had been forced to delay opening since it was first opened in 1976.

== Locomotives ==
The Huckleberry Railroad owns several locomotives and many pieces of rolling stock. Two steam locomotives (#152 and #464) have been restored to operating condition to pull vintage wooden passenger cars along the shores of Mott Lake.

=== Locomotive roster ===
==== In service ====
- 12: Formerly Bethlehem Steel Co. #12, it is a General-Electric 45 ton diesel locomotive purchased from McHugh Locomotive's & Equipment Co. in trade for former engines #5, a Plymouth Diesel switcher, and #7, a General Electric 50 ton locomotive.
- 152: Formerly Alaska Engineering Commission 1920 Baldwin 4-6-0 #152; #152 underwent restoration starting in 2016 and returned to service in late July 2018.
- 571: Formerly Badger Army Ammunition Plymouth HSG #571
- 585: Formerly Badger Army Ammunition Plymouth HSG #585

==== Out of service ====
- 464: Formerly Denver & Rio Grande Western 1903 Baldwin 2-8-2 K-27 "Mudhen"; #464 is currently undergoing a rebuild.
- 3: Formerly Quincy & Torch Lake Railroad 1894 Brooks 2-6-0 #3; #3 is currently stored disassembled by the railroad shop complex
- 4: Formerly Potosi & Rio Verde 1904 Baldwin 2-8-0 #4; #4 is on display by the main line.

== In media ==
In 2009, Crossroads Village was the set for the feature film Alleged, which is based on the 1925 Scopes trial. The Huckleberry Railroad is shown in the film. It starred Brian Dennehy as defense attorney Clarence Darrow and Fred Thompson as prosecutor William Jennings Bryan.

== See also ==
- List of heritage railroads in the United States
- History of railroads in Michigan
