= K27/28 Beijing-Dandong-Pyongyang through train =

Train service in China and North Korea

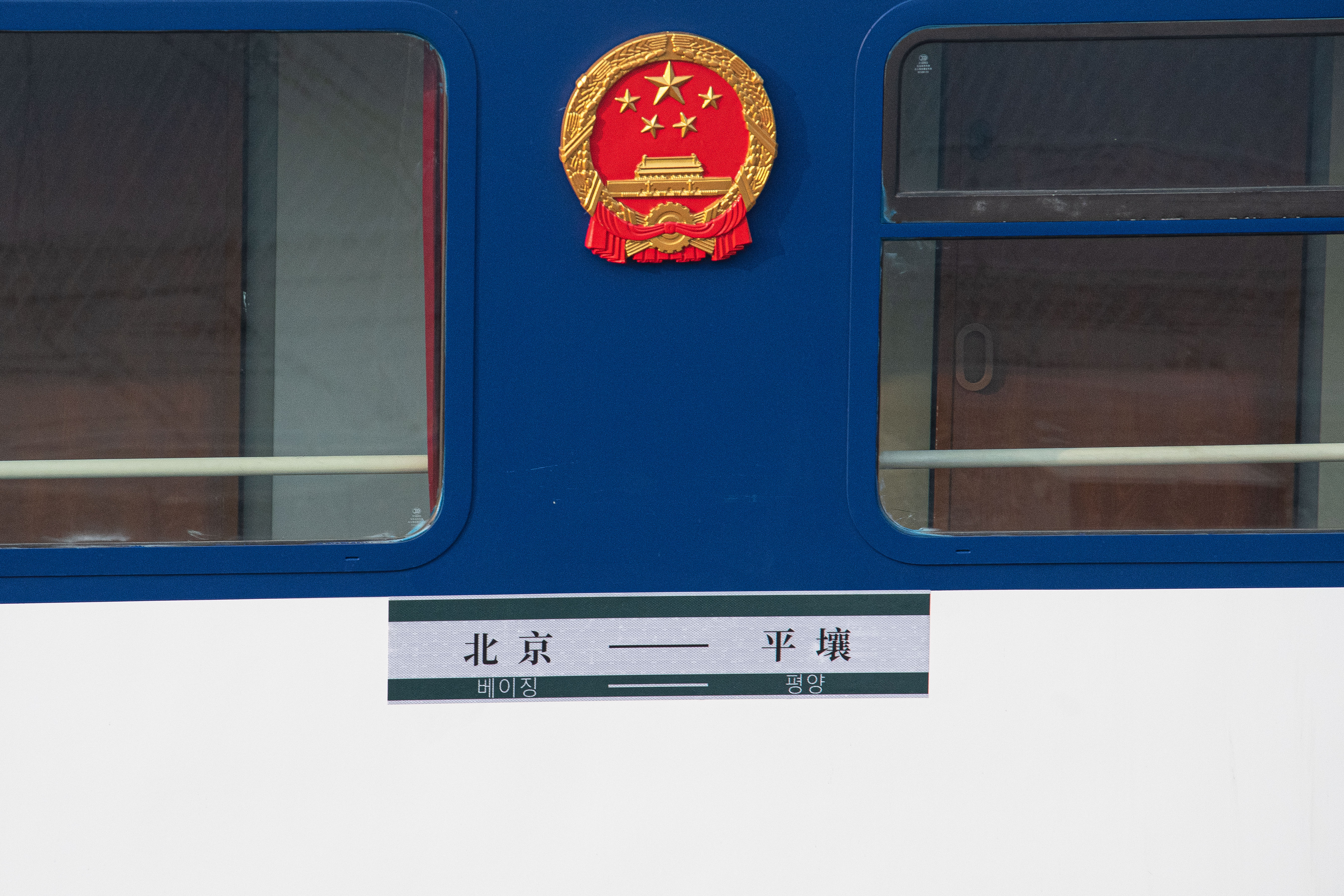
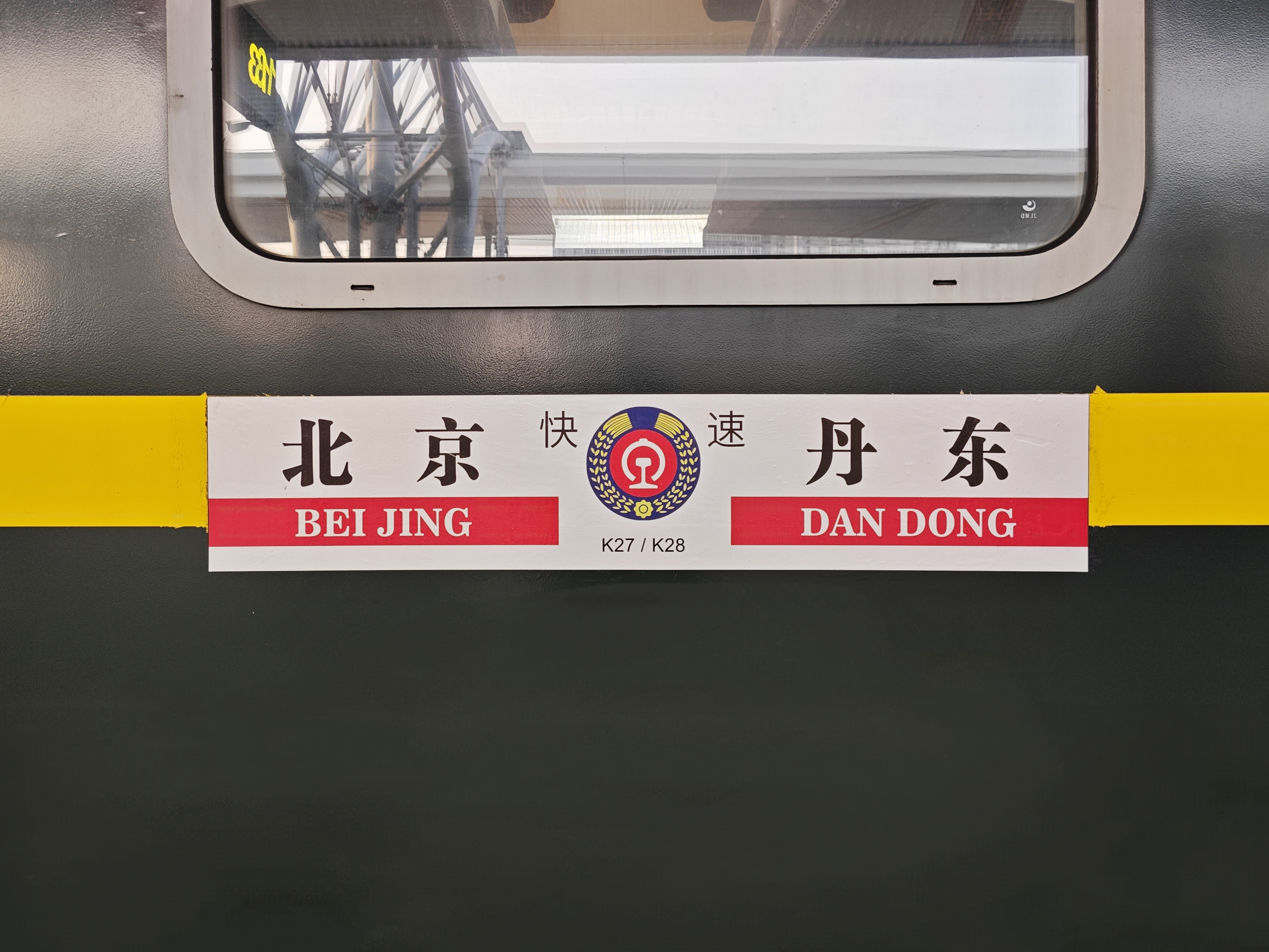

Overview
- Status: Operational
- Current operators: CR Beijing; KSR Pyongyang

Route
- Termini: Beijing; Pyongyang
- Stops: Shenyang, Dandong, Sinuiju Youth
- Train number: K27/28

On-board services
- Classes: Soft sleeper Hard sleeper Hard seat (Chinese section only)
- Seating arrangements: Yes (Chinese section only)
- Sleeping arrangements: Yes
- Catering facilities: Yes (Chinese section only)
- Baggage facilities: Yes (Chinese section only)

Technical
- Rolling stock: CR Type 25G (Chinese section); CR Type 25T (International section); KSR Type 30
- Track gauge: 1,435 mm (4 ft 8 1/2 in)
- Electrification: 25 kV 50 Hz（Beijing-Shenyang）

China Railways K27/28 is an international train running between Beijing and Pyongyang. It commenced operations on the 21 May 1954. The train is numbered differently depending on the section of its journey. The cross-border section is numbered 95/85 and the Sinuiju–Pyongyang section 51/52. The train, operated by China Railway, departs Beijing on Mondays and Thursdays, taking about 24 hours to arrive, and returns from Pyongyang every Wednesday and Saturday, taking about 23 hours. Since 10 October 1983, the Korean State Railway also contributes trains to this service, departing every Monday and Thursday from Pyongyang, and returning from Beijing every Wednesday and Saturday.

== History ==
On 16 December 1953, China and North Korea agreed to commence operations of a through train service between Beijing and Pyongyang from June 1954, with China Railway as the operator. The agreement came into effect on 1 April 1954, when the Korean State Railway began international train operations. The direct express train 13/14 between Beijing and Dandong commenced operations on 21 May 1954, with services operated by China Railway. On 3 June, train 13/14 carried 2 soft sleepers and a hard seat-luggage coach to Pyongyang for the first time, marking the beginning of the Beijing–Pyongyang international train.

On 1 February 1955, a resolution adopted between China and Soviet Union regarding the Moscow–Pyongyang through train service agreed that the coaches would be attached to train number 13/14 at Shenyang.

The coaches were changed to hard and a soft sleeper coach in 1957.

On 11 June 1959, a mass reschedule by the Chinese Railway Ministry renumbered the train to 27/28.

The Chinese border station was renamed to Dandong in 1965.

By an agreement between China and North Korea, all train crew are issued a 3-month approval instead of a single journey approval.

27/28 was elevated to general fast train in 1981.

By an agreement in 1982, the Beijing–Pyongyang through train services would be jointly operated with the Korean State Railway. The first service by KSR commenced on 10 October 1983, since then the train service has been rotated between CR and KSR.

In 1985, the train was rescheduled from twice weekly to four times a week, with both operators running two trains.

In 1991, it became obligatory to report if the train was delayed or additional coaches were carried.

During the third acceleration campaign, in 2000, 27/28 was elevated to a fast train, as K27/28.

During the fifth acceleration campaign, in 2004, K27/28 was rerouted on the Shanhaiguan–Shenyang section. It returned to the original route during the sixth acceleration campaign in 2007.

From 2008 on, the Type 25G air-conditioned and German-made type 18 coaches were replaced with type 25T coaches, with the Korean coaches being replaced from October 2012. KSR type 31 (25K) coaches were replaced by type 30 (25G) coaches.

From 16 November 2014, CR changed the domestic coaches to Type 25G, the international coaches remain unchanged. The replaced Type 25T coaches are reserved in depot and serve as backup.

Tourism into North Korea was suspended In Late January 2020 owing to the COVID-19 pandemic. Shortly afterwards, the Dandong-Pyongyang section of the K27/28 service was suspended, while the Chinese section remained in operation.

Service into North Korea via the Dandong-Pyongyang section of the service was reinstated in March 2026, with the first train leaving from Beijing on 12th March 2026

== Coaches ==
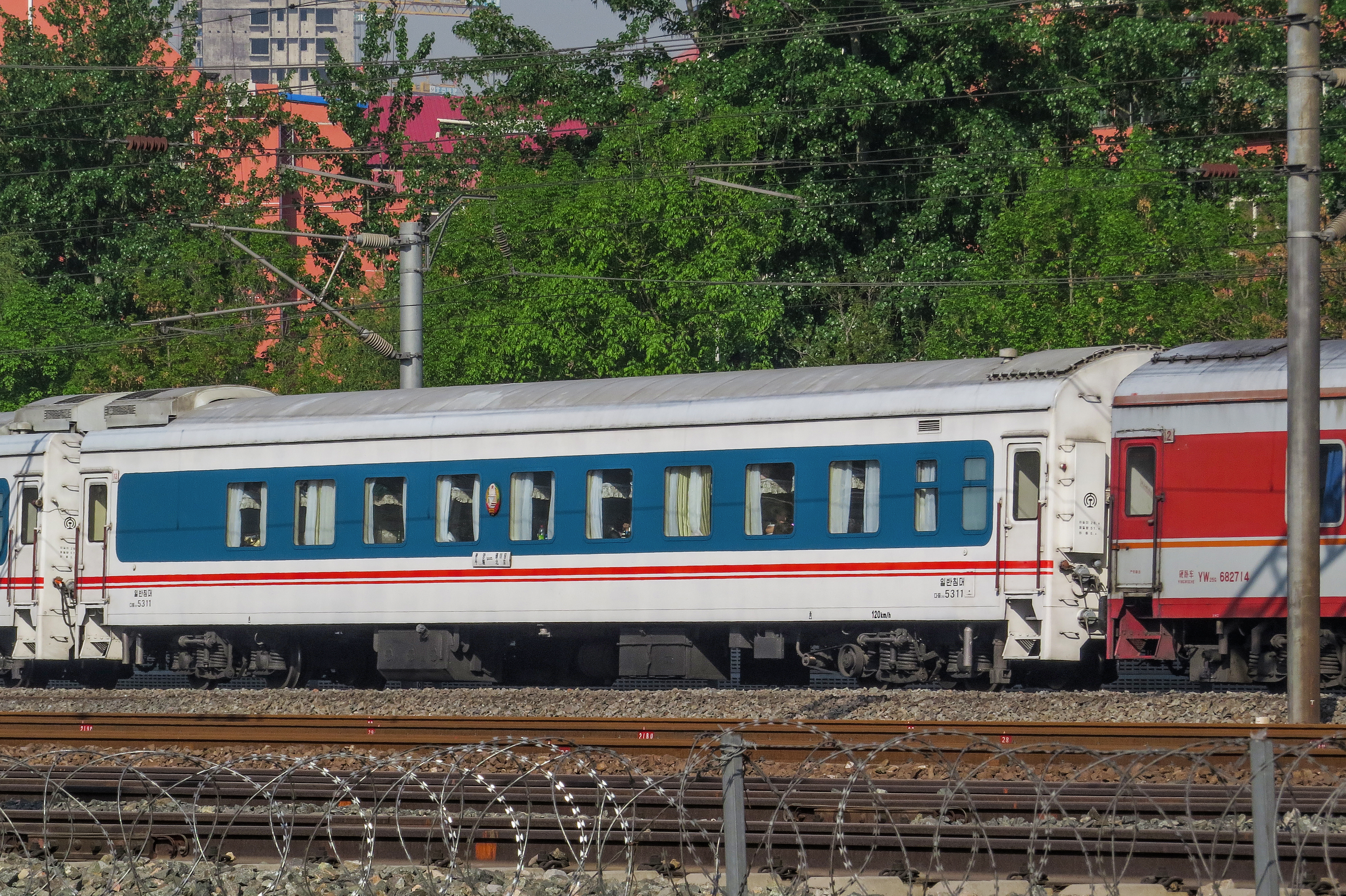
KSR Standard Sleeper coach

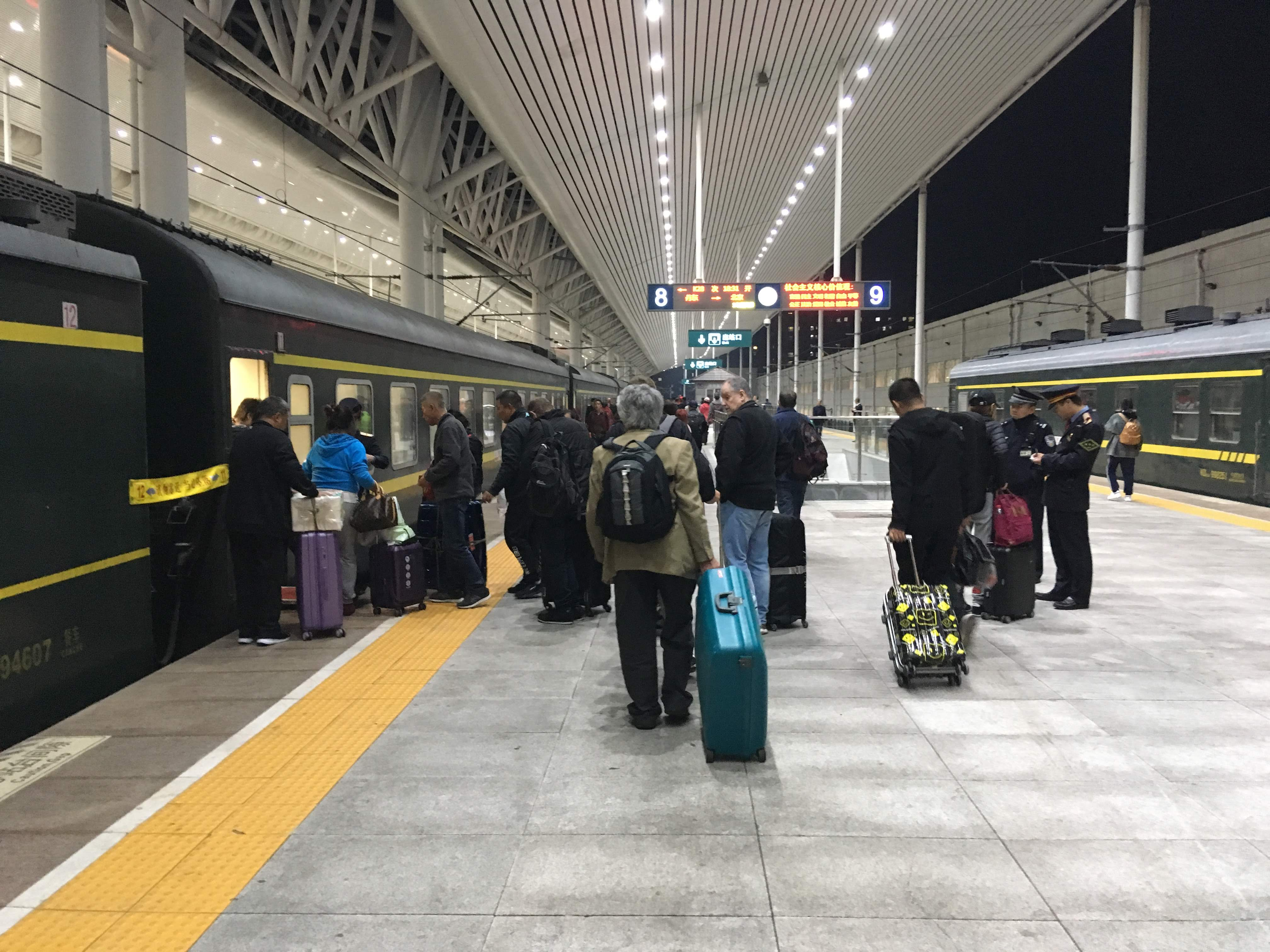
Train at Dandong

The trains are operated by China Railway type 25G coaches, usually as a 16-coach train between Beijing and Dandong, with 9 hard sleepers, 4 hard seating, and one soft sleeper, canteen and luggage coach each, operating daily. The international coaches are two type 25T coaches attached to the train, one hard sleeper and one soft sleeper. Trains operated KSR attach two Type 30 hard sleeper coaches (Korean：일반침대30, lit. "standard sleeper"). These coaches are coupled to the Dandong–Pyongyang through train at Dandong station.

K27 used to attach two coaches from the Moscow–Pyongyang train at Shenyang station, which were also decoupled at the same station on the return trip. Due to technical issues and low ridership, by agreement between RZD, CR and KSR the coaches for Pyongyang are no longer be attached to the Vostok train and then to the train from Beijing and instead are carried by the train to Vladivostok, with the coaches operated by KSR.

Attendants of K27/28 are provided by CR Beijing and KSR Pyongyang depending on the train operator.

Section	Beijing↔Dandong					Beijing↔Pyongyang	
Coach no.	1	2-10	11	12	13-16	13	12
Coach	XL25G Luggage	YW25G Hard sleeper	RW25G Soft sleeper	CA25G Canteen	YZ25G Hard seat	YW25T/KSR Type 30 (일반침대30) Hard sleeper／Standard sleeper	RW25T/KSR Type 30 (일반침대30) Soft sleeper／Standard sleeper
Operator	CR Beijing					CR Beijing / KSR Pyongyang	

== Locomotives used ==
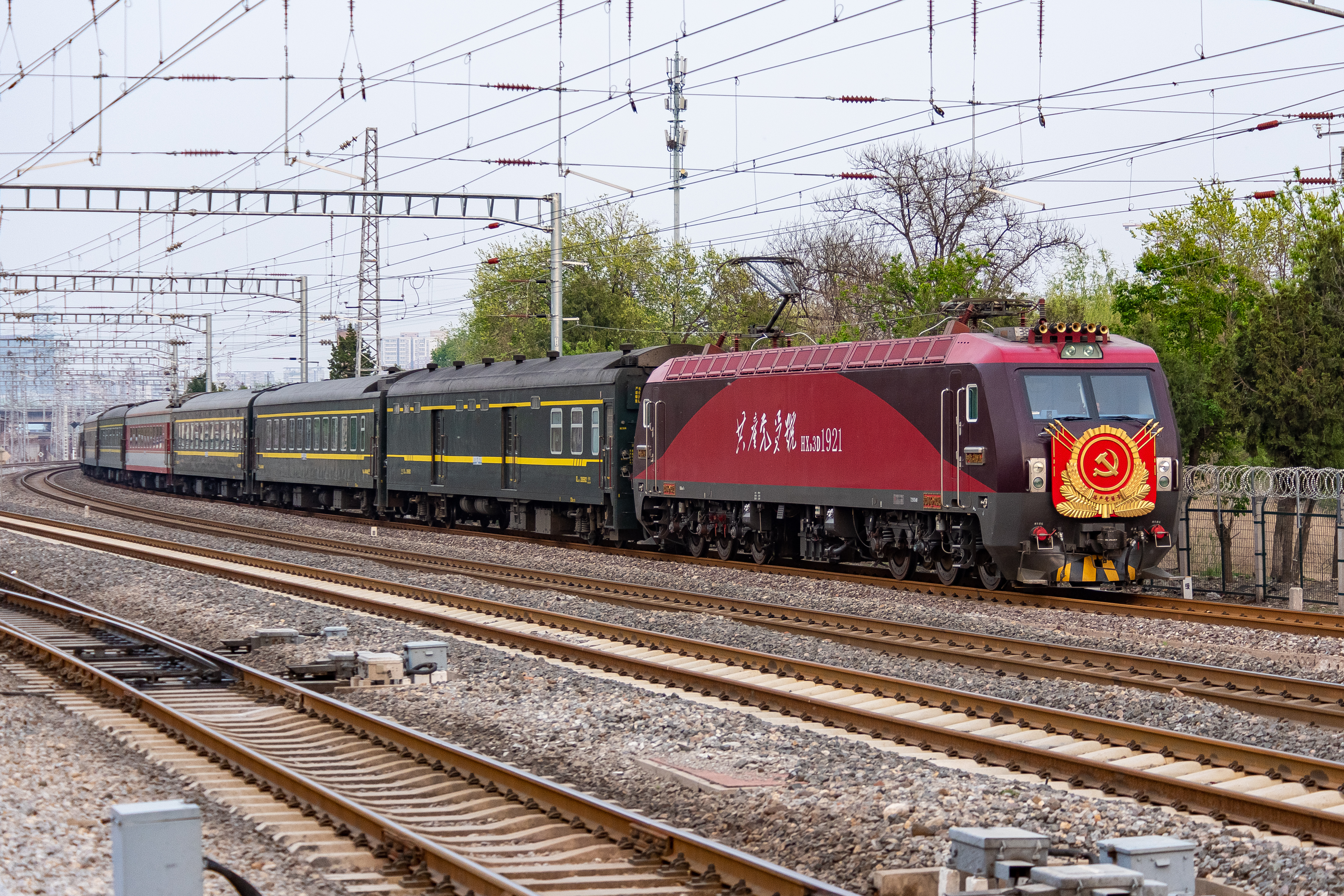
CR Shenyang HXD3D "Communist" hauling K27

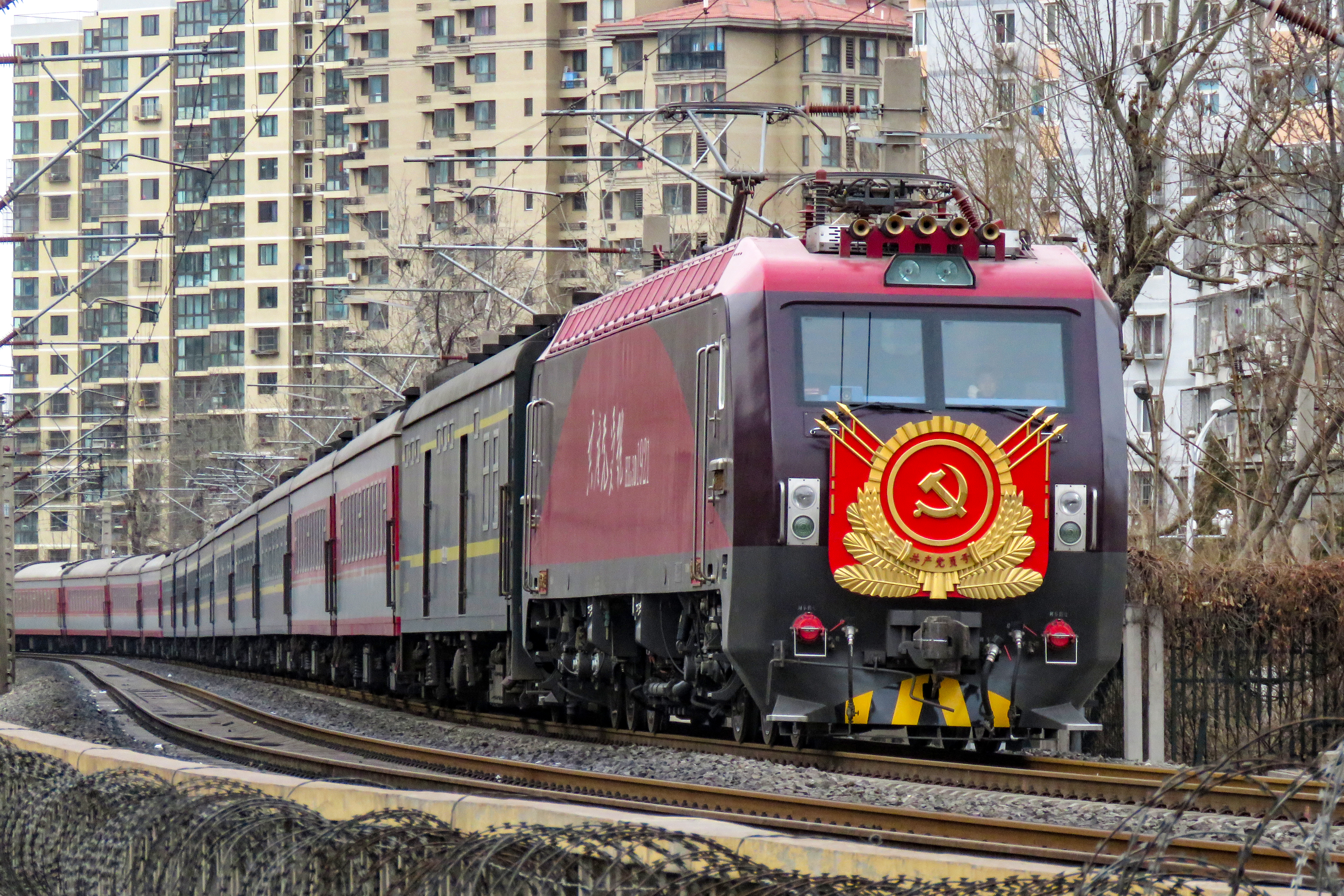
CR Shenyang HXD3D "Communist" hauling K28

K27/28 is hauled by a CR Shenyang HXD3D from Beijing to Shenyang, and DF11G from Shenyang to Dandong.

At the border the train is hauled by CR Shenyang or KSR DF5 (Korean：내연100) for the cross border section, then a DF4 or DF4B (Korean：내연200) from KSR is used to haul the train to Pyongyang.

Section	Beijing ↔ Shenyang	Shenyang ↔ Dandong	Dandong ↔ Sinuiju	Sinuiju ↔ Pyongyang
Loco Operator Shift	HXD3D "Communist" CR Shenyang Shenyang driver	DF11G CR Shenyang Shenyang driver	DF5 CR Shenyang/KSR Dandong driver/KSR driver	DF4/DF4B KSR KSR driver

== Schedule ==
- Schedule updated as of 12 March 2026

K27/95/52				Stop	K28/85/51			
Train no.	Day	Arrival	Departure	Stop	Arrival	Departure	Day	Train no.
K27	Day 1	Depart	17:26	Beijing	08:40	Arrival	Day 2	K28
K27	—	↓	↓	Guangyang	07:39	07:42	Day 2	K28
K27	Day 1	19:03	19:09	Tianjin	06:49	06:55	Day 2	K28
K27	Day 1	20:30	20:32	Tangshan	05:21	05:23	Day 2	K28
K27	Day 1	22:36	22:42	Shanhaiguan	02:58	03:04	Day 2	K28
K27	Day 2	03:20	03:40	Shenyang	22:07	22:24	Day 1	K28
K27	Day 2	04:46	04:52	Benxi	20:58	21:01	Day 1	K28
K27	Day 2	06:38	06:41	Fenghuangcheng	19:11	19:13	Day 1	K28
K27/95	Day 2	07:35	10:00	Dandong	16:23	18:18	Day 1	85/K28
↑ China（Beijing Time UTC+08:00） / North Korea（Pyongyang Time UTC+09:00） ↓
95/52	Day 2	11:10	13:06	Sinuiju Youth	15:44	17:13	Day 1	51/85
52	Day 2	14:12	14:29	Tongrim	14:27	14:31	Day 1	51
52	Day 2	15:43	15:53	Chongju Youth	13:11	13:17	Day 1	51
52	Day 2	18:07	Arrival	Pyongyang	Departure	10:26	Day 1	51

== See also ==
- P'yŏngŭi Line
- Visa policy of North Korea
- China Railways 95/85
- Vostok (Russian train)
