= East Saginaw and St. Clair Railroad =

The East Saginaw and St. Clair Railroad was a wholly owned subsidiary of the Flint and Pere Marquette Railroad (F&PM). It was established in 1872 to construct a branch from the company's main line in East Saginaw, Michigan through The Thumb to Port Huron. In 1889 it was consolidated with the F&PM and ceased to exist as an independent entity.
