= Flint and Pere Marquette Railroad =

Railroad company in Michigan

The Flint and Pere Marquette Railroad (F&PM) is a defunct railroad which operated in the U.S. state of Michigan between 1857 and 1899. It was one of the three companies which merged to become the Pere Marquette Railway.

== Early history ==
The F&PM was chartered on January 22, 1857 as the Flint and Pere Marquette Railway for the purpose of constructing an east-west railway line on a route, for which a federal land grant was offered, from Flint, Michigan to Lake Michigan at Pere Marquette (now Ludington, Michigan). The early promoters of the road were George M. Dewey and E.H. Hazelton of Flint, with Dewey serving as the first president of the F&PM. Construction started in 1859 in East Saginaw. A more energetic management took charge in 1860 when Captain Eber Brock Ward of Detroit, a prominent lumberman, vessel owner, and steel manufacturer, was elected to the presidency of the F&PM. Service began on January 20, 1862, on the 26.1-mile (42.0 km) section from East Saginaw south to Mount Morris. In December 1864 the F&PM gained access to Detroit via trackage rights over the Flint and Holly Railroad and the Detroit and Milwaukee Railroad.

Construction westward from Saginaw commenced in 1866 with the first section of 20 miles (32 km), to Midland, opened December 1, 1867. In the Annual Report to the Stockholders of December 31, 1867, the secretary of the F&PM, Henry C. Potter, called for the continued building of the line toward Lake Michigan: "The importance and magnitude of the lumber traffic on the Muskegon and Manistee Rivers urge this company to speedy construction on its road west."

On September 2, 1868, the F&PM was consolidated with the Flint and Holly Railroad. Besides adding a key segment of trackage to the growing F&PM system, the merger brought into the F&PM the Crapo family - Henry H. Crapo, Governor of Michigan in 1865-69, and his son, William W. Crapo, later president of the F&PM. An extension of 6.5 miles (10.5 km) from Midland to Averill was completed on October 25, 1868, giving the F&PM 60 miles (97 km) of route west from Flint and entitling the company to 76,300 acres (309 km^{2}) in land grants; since 1862 the company had received a total of 307,200 acres (1,243 km^{2}).

Slowly the railroad snaked its way through the forests of central Michigan. It was completed to Clare, 24.4 miles (39.3 km) west of Averill, in November 1870; another 15.6 miles (25.1 km) was finished in March 1871. With the completion of 22 miles (35 km) to Reed City in December 1871, the F&PM made a connection with the north-south main line of the Grand Rapids and Indiana Railway. The line was now 48.4 miles (77.9 km) from its goal of Ludington.

On June 4, 1872, the F&PM was consolidated with the Holly, Wayne and Monroe Railroad (opened for service the same day); the Bay City and East Saginaw Railroad (a feeder line leased since 1867); the Flint River Railroad (Flint to Otter Lake); and the Cass River Railroad (East Saginaw to Vassar).

== The Ludington terminal ==
In 1868 President Ward of the F&PM opened negotiations with James Ludington for a terminal site at his namesake town with frontage of Pere Marquette Lake. James Ludington was the owner of the only mill then at Ludington. He attempted to spin out the talks; though he favored completion of the F&PM, Ludington knew Ward intended to build mills to tap the timber along the Pere Marquette River. Fearing this would make Ward too big, Ludington refused to sell a terminal site or mill sites at any price, hoping to squeeze Ward into selling some of his 70,000 acres (28,000 ha) of timber at a bargain price. Ludington found that Ward would not sell and, more importantly, that Ward was not a man to be trifled with.

Ward learned early in 1869 that Ludington's logging crews had, accidentally or otherwise, cut pine from part of his land. He kept quiet until Ludington went to Detroit on business, then had him arrested and lodged in the Wayne County Jail on charges of trespassing and timber theft. He secured a court judgment of $650,000 against Ludington, who was ruined; he suffered a stroke and was forced to quit business. His successor in business, the Pere Marquette Lumber Company, reached an amicable agreement with Ward in August 1869 for both the railway terminal and the mill sites.

"In November 1874," recalled editor Charles G. Wing of the Ludington Daily News in 1920, "when the F&PM railroad was nearly completed to Ludington, Governor John J. Bagley came over the line on a tour of inspection ... [and] received the most distinguished mark of attention Ludington could show. He rode to and from his railroad car in the only covered carriage up to that time ever owned within the borders of Mason County."

The road was completed to Ludington on December 1, 1874, giving the F&PM 253 miles (407 km) of main line. By 1877 the company had received 511,520.2 acres (207,004.9 ha) of federal land grants, of which over half - 275,741.69 acres (111,588.70 ha) - had been sold, contributing $2,369,729.21 to the railroad's revenues.

Ward died suddenly while walking in Detroit on January 2, 1875. Elected to succeed him as president of the F&PM was Jesse Hoyt of New York, who had extensive lumber and salt interests in East Saginaw.

Cross-lake steamship service between Ludington and Sheboygan, Wisconsin was inaugurated May 31, 1875, with a leased steamer, the sidewheeler SS John Sherman, with John W. Stewart as its captain. At Sheboygan the line interchanged freight with the Sheboygan and Fond du Lac Railroad. Quickly outgrowing both the SS John Sherman and the terminal at Sheboygan, the line was shifted to Milwaukee in 1876. The Goodrich Transportation Company provided service under contract to the railroad from 1876 to 1883. Ships assigned to the route by Goodrich included the De Pere, Corona, Oconto, Alpena and, best-known of all, the City of Ludington. The F&PM terminated its contract with Goodrich on April 1, 1883.

A grain elevator was built in 1877 on the Ludington waterfront by a group of investors associated with the railroad. In 1879 a freight warehouse was built just south of the grain elevator.

== Receivership ==
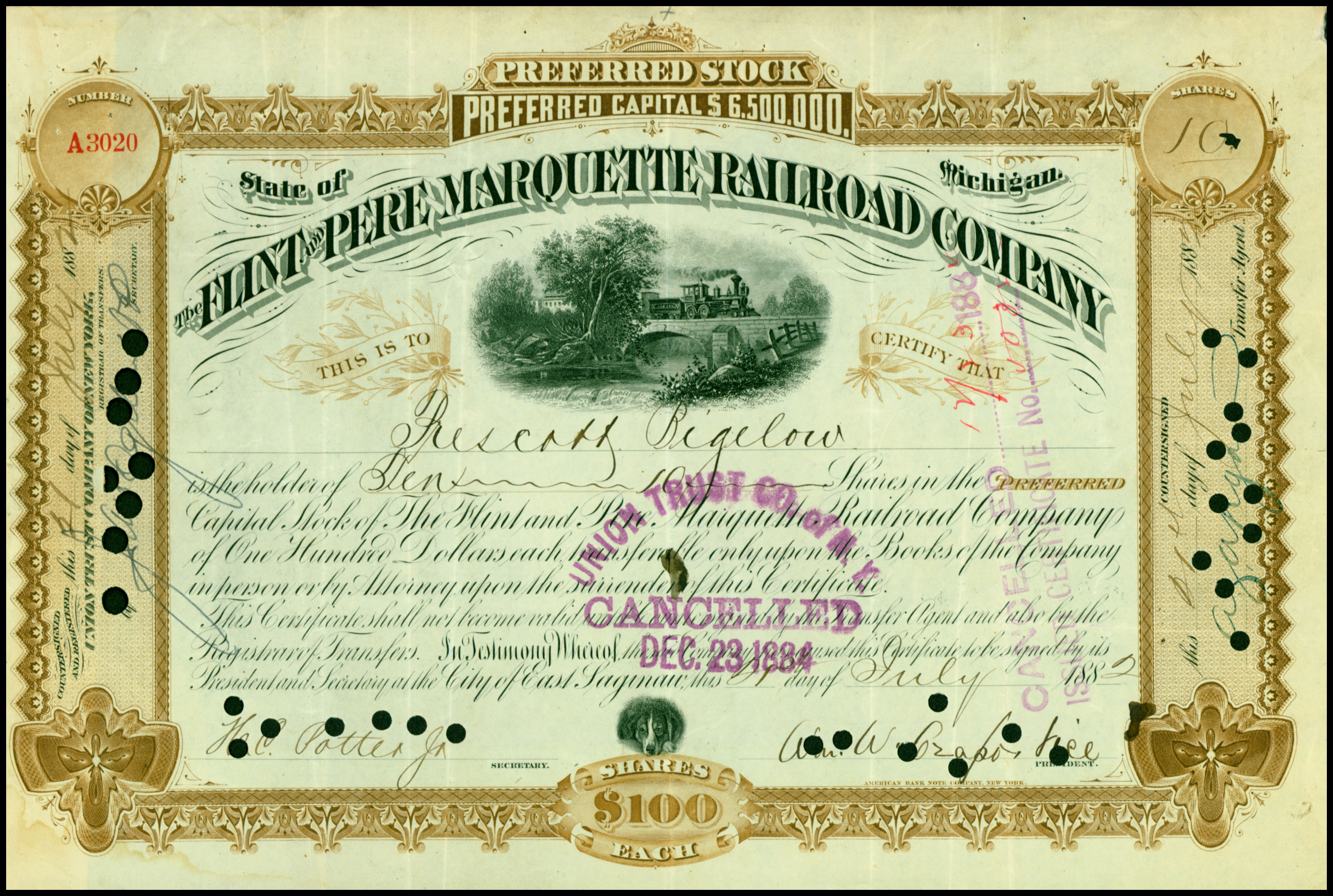
Preferred stock of the Flint and Pere Marquette Railroad Company, issued 1. July 1882

On July 1, 1879, the F&PM went into receivership, owing $1,200,000 in unpaid interest on bonds with bonded interest accumulating at a rate of $385,000 a year. Gross revenues had declined every year since the Panic of 1873, a situation exacerbated by the crash of the lumber market in July 1877. The company remained in receivership until September 30, 1880, when it was reorganized as the Flint and Pere Marquette Railroad. Under the reorganization plan the F&PM issued $6,500,000 in preferred stock. No common stock was to be issued to holders of certificates of old common stock until five consecutive dividends of 7 per cent had been paid on preferred stock. In the event, this never occurred, as there were only two consecutive years (1883 and 1884) in which a 7 per cent dividend was declared on preferred stock.

While in receivership the company built two new lines in 1879: a 3 ft (914 mm) narrow gauge branch from Coleman to Mount Pleasant, 14.5 miles (23.3 km), as the Saginaw and Mount Pleasant Railroad (converted to 4 ft 8 1/2 in (1,435 mm) standard gauge in 1884), and a standard gauge branch from Clare to Harrison, 16.8 miles (27.0 km), as the Saginaw and Clare County Railroad.

== The Manistee Railroad ==
For some years, Manistee had boasted of being the largest American city not served by a railroad. This changed after the incorporation on June 19, 1880, of an F&PM subsidiary, the Manistee Railroad, to build a 26.53-mile (42.70 km) branch line from Manistee Junction (today Walhalla), east of Ludington, to Manistee. The villages of Bachelor, Fountain and Free Soil quickly sprang up on this line. Upon its opening on December 5, 1881, the branch gave the F&PM access to Manistee lumbering and salt manufacturing resources.

== The Black Boats ==
In September 1882 the F&PM began operating their own propeller steamers between Ludington and Milwaukee. The first two were the F&PM No. 1 and F&PM No. 2, wooden propellers of 553 and 537 gross tons respectively. Built at Detroit in 1882, they were outfitted to carry passengers, package freight and bulk grain. At a time when most Lake Michigan passenger steamers were painted white, they quickly became known as the "Black Boats" for their black hulls. Each was lengthened 36 feet (11 m) in 1883, and steamship service was extended to Manistee in 1884.

As business grew, two similar but larger propellers were built at Detroit, the 924-ton F&PM No. 3 in 1887 and the 941-ton F&PM No. 4 in 1888. The 1,723-ton F&PM No. 5, built at West Bay City in 1890, differed in originally being configured as a straight package freighter with no passenger accommodations. Sailings between Ludington and Manitowoc, Wisconsin, were inaugurated in 1890 by the F&PM No. 1.

== Decline of lumbering ==
Since Jesse Hoyt lived in New York City and did not visit Michigan after 1877, he was represented on the F&PM board by his attorney, William L. Webber of East Saginaw, who also served as the company's general counsel and land commissioner. Upon the death of Hoyt on August 14, 1882, William W. Crapo of New Bedford, Massachusetts, a director since 1868, was elected president of the F&PM. Under his presidency the F&PM was run very much like a New England railroad rather than a Western logging line, as heretofore.

After 1887 the transportation of logs by the F&PM began to fall off rapidly. This was offset somewhat by the growing freight traffic of the company's steamship line. In 1888 the decline in logs transported amounted to 193,790 tons ($153,308 in gross earnings), while earning of the Black Boats totaled $40,556 and rapidly increased as the F&PM attracted movements of wood products, flour, and grain.

On January 31, 1889, the F&PM was consolidated with the East Saginaw and St. Clair Railroad, the Saginaw and Clare County Railroad, the Saginaw and Mount Pleasant Railroad, and the Manistee Railroad. The F&PM bought the Port Huron and Northwestern Railway on April 1, 1889, converted it to standard gauge, and constructed a new line east from Yale to Port Huron. It also converted to standard gauge its existing branch line between East Saginaw and Yale. This gave the F&PM a standard gauge line across the breadth of Michigan, from Lake Michigan to Lake Huron.

The F&PM was a part-owner of the Fort Street Union Depot Company in association with the Wabash Railway, Canadian Pacific Railway, and Detroit, Lansing and Northern Railroad. Construction of this Detroit station commenced in 1890 and it was opened for service on January 22, 1893.

Until 1897 the F&PM reached the important railroad center of Toledo, Ohio, over the rails of the Lake Shore and Michigan Southern Railway. An extension of the F&PM, 15.2 miles (24.5 km) from Monroe to Alexis (an unincorporated place just across the state line in Ohio and just outside the city limits of Toledo), was constructed by the Monroe and Toledo Railway. Soon after the line's completion, the M&T was purchased outright by the F&PM on August 27, 1897. Entry into Toledo from Alexis, 6.6 miles (10.6 km), was secured in 1897 through a 99-year lease of trackage from the Ann Arbor Railroad.

Movements of grain in bulk had become so important to the economics of the railroad that when the elevator at Ludington was destroyed by fire on July 7, 1899, it was immediately rebuilt. The new, larger grain elevator was ready for operation by November 20, 1899.

== Car ferry service ==
In 1895 the F&PM reached an agreement with the Wisconsin Central Railway to establish a cross-lake railway car ferry line between Ludington and Manitowoc. A steel car ferry designed by Robert Logan of 2,443 tons, the Pere Marquette, was built at West Bay City, where she was launched on December 30, 1896. With Joseph Russell as master, the Pere Marquette arrived at Manitowoc on her maiden voyage from Ludington on the morning of February 17, 1897, interchanging freight with both the Wisconsin Central and the Chicago and North Western Railway. The car ferry operation was so successful that it soon became obvious that service would have to be expanded; in 1900 the Pere Marquette transported 27,000 railroad cars across Lake Michigan.

== Consolidation ==
As early as 1886 the Chicago and West Michigan Railway shared common directors with the Detroit, Lansing and Northern Railroad, which was reorganized a decade later, in 1896, as the Detroit, Grand Rapids and Western Railroad. On December 27, 1897, the DGR&W inaugurated car ferry service between Muskegon and Milwaukee with the wooden car ferry Muskegon (later renamed Pere Marquette 16).

By January 1, 1899, the F&PM had sold 468,690 acres (1,896.7 km^{2}) of the 513,000 acres (2,080 km^{2}) granted the company by the federal government. Sales amounted to $4,847,007 - an average of $10.34 an acres.

An agreement was reached in 1899 for the consolidation of the F&PM with the Chicago and West Michigan and the Detroit, Grand Rapids and Western with securities of the newly organized exchanged for those of the constituent companies. The F&PM declared a special 2% dividend out of assets as part of the consolidation plan. The Pere Marquette Railway was incorporated November 1, 1899, and took over the properties on January 1, 1900.

Charles M. Heald of the C&WM and DGR&W was president of the Pere Marquette with William W. Crapo of the F&PM as chairman of the board of directors. On February 1, 1900, the new company acquired the Saginaw, Tuscola and Huron Railroad, which had been built in 1881-86 by investors associated with the F&PM.

== Presidents of the F&PM ==
- George M. Dewey 1857-1860
- Eber Brock Ward 1860-1875
- Jesse Hoyt 1875-1882
- William W. Crapo 1882-1899
