= Flint River (Michigan) =

River in central Michigan, United States

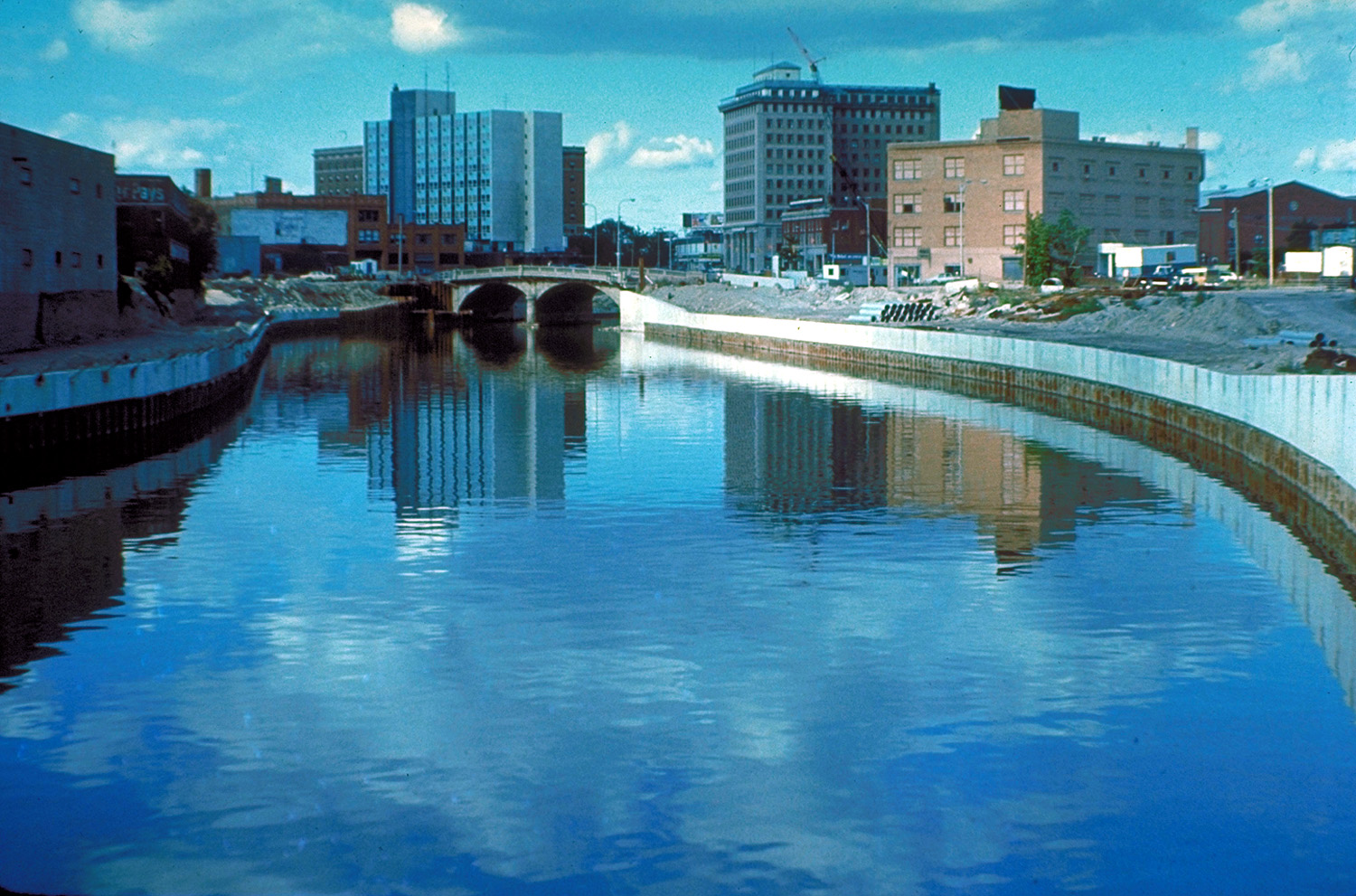
- The Flint River in Flint, Michigan.

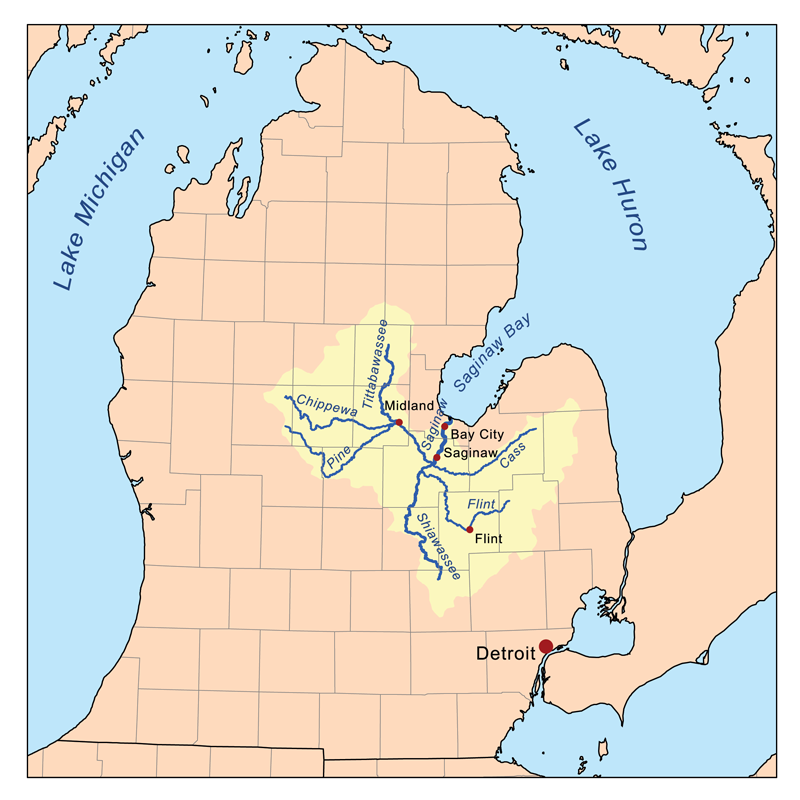
- Map of the Saginaw River watershed showing the Flint River as one of its major tributaries

Physical characteristics
- Source
  - location: Lapeer County
- Mouth: Shiawassee River
  - coordinates: 43°21′14″N 84°3′34″W
- Length: 78 mi (126 km)
- Discharge
  - location: Shiawassee National Wildlife Refuge
  - average: 1,024.18 cu ft/s (29 m^{3}/s) (estimate)

Basin features
- River system: Saginaw River

The Flint River is a 78.3-mile-long (126.0 km) river in the Flint/Tri-Cities region of Michigan in the United States. The river's headwaters are in Columbiaville in Lapeer County and flows through the counties of Lapeer, Genesee, and Saginaw. The cities of Lapeer, Flint, Flushing, and Montrose are along its course.

== Name ==
The river's name is a translation from the Ojibwe language ᐲᐧᐋᓇᑰᓐ ᓰᐱ Biiwaanagoonh-ziibi (Flinty River). For a time, an Indian Reservation named Pewonigowink (Biiwaanagoonying: By the Flinty [River]) existed near Genesee, Michigan.

== Course ==
The Flint River drains 1,332 square miles (3,450 km^{2}) of Michigan, in Lapeer, Genesee, Shiawassee, Saginaw, Oakland, Tuscola, and Sanilac counties.

The river forms in Lapeer County near Columbiaville where the river's South Branch and North Branch come together. Its volume is supplemented by numerous creeks, including: Kearsley Creek, Thread Creek and Swartz Creek in Genesee County, and Misteguay Creek in Saginaw County. The river flows in a southwesterly direction past Flint before turning northward near Flushing. It empties into the Shiawassee River in the Shiawassee National Wildlife Refuge near the city of Saginaw, as do the Bad River and Cass River. The Shiawassee then converges with the Tittabawassee River to form the Saginaw River. The Saginaw empties into the Saginaw Bay of Lake Huron.

== Features along the Flint River ==
The river is dammed in Richfield Township to form the Holloway Reservoir, which was formed in 1953 and fully completed 1955. The reservoir was constructed, originally, as a water supply for Flint, and to move the river through the city more quickly to dilute sewage. By 1967, though, the city purchased its drinking water from the City of Detroit, via a pipeline from Lake Huron, and only used the reservoir as an emergency back-up water supply.

The C.S. Mott Dam just 5 miles (8 km) downstream and west of Genesee forms C S Mott Lake and was completed in 1972 for recreational use. Local attractions along the lake include Crossroads Village (home of the Huckleberry Railroad), Stepping Stone Falls, and the riverboat Genesee Belle.

The next dam is the Utah Dam. A largely steel dam, it was completed in 1928 to prevent industrial discharges from entering the drinking water supply downstream. The gates have since been locked in the open position so that it no longer impedes the flow of the river.

The Hamilton Dam existed downstream at the University of Michigan–Flint campus in downtown Flint. Constructed in 1920, it once also served as a pedestrian bridge, but is now in severe disrepair. Because of its dilapidation, the Michigan Department of Environmental Quality ordered that steps be taken by 2008, and if that did not occur that the river be lowered to reduce the use of the dam. In 2008, the city of Flint spent $30,000 on a pre-engineering study to assess whether a new dam was needed or the old one be repaired. The dam was removed by 2025.

Finally, downstream from the Hamilton Dam is an inflatable dam just west of the Grand Traverse Street Bridge. The Fabridam was completed in 1979 mostly for visual and recreational purposes as it impounds very little of the river. It was replaced in 2001 with a $604,000 Obermeyer Hydro Inc. dam.

In the city of Flint, the river flows past the sites of several former General Motors factories, most notably Chevrolet's first assembly plant, which was bisected by the river, and downtown through the campus of the University of Michigan–Flint and Riverbank Park. Also along the river front is the Flint Carriage Factory site, later Dort Motors. The Durant-Dort Carriage Company Office, now a historic landmark, is across the street. Continuing downstream, the river runs past Kettering University and McLaren Hospital, then into Flint Township and through Flushing. The stretch of the Flint River from downtown Flint to Kettering University is channelized with concrete sides.

A recreational trail called the Flint River Trail runs along the river from Grand Traverse Street in downtown Flint to Carpenter Road on one side and Johnson Elementary School on Pierson Road on the other. It is a paved path, except behind the Flint water plant. North of Carpenter Road, the trail connects to the Mott Lake Trailway, which goes to Bluebell Beach on Bray Road and Stepping Stone Falls on Branch Road in Genesee Township. Another portion of the Mott Lake Trailway runs alongside the lake from the corner of Center Road and Coldwater Road to the corner of Genesee Road and Stanley Road. Together, the trails run 21.5 miles (34.6 km). An organization named Friends of the Flint River Trail maintains it, in addition to the Genesee County Parks & Recreation Commission and Flint Parks & Recreation Department.

== Wildlife, conservation, and pollution ==
The river has suffered from decades upon decades of industrial pollution, although cleanups following the Clean Water Act have vastly improved pollution since the 1950s and 1960s.

The river has the same fishing advisory as the Great Lakes. Fish in the river include smallmouth bass, walleye, and some trout.

The water in the Flint River has high levels of chlorides (thought to be the result of, in part, road salt), making it highly corrosive to lead pipes. Chlorides do not pose a direct threat to fish, wildlife, or humans, but cause problems in that they corrode lead and other metals in piping and plumbing.

=== Flint water crisis ===
In April 2014, reacting to years of cost increases in water purchased from Detroit, the City of Flint voted to join a new water project bringing Lake Huron water directly to Flint by 2016. When the decision was announced, Detroit invoked a termination clause in the contract cutting Flint off from Detroit water in one year. Flint and Detroit negotiated to maintain the connection to the Detroit system but ultimately the decision was made to switch its water source from Detroit back to water from the Flint River. Almost immediately, residents began complaining about the water's taste and appearance, saying it was cloudy and emitted a foul odor.

The city issued a notice informing Flint residents of their water containing unlawful levels of trihalomethanes, a chlorine byproduct linked to cancer and other diseases. The Hurley Medical Center, in Flint, released a study in September 2015, which stated the proportion of infants and children with high concentrations of lead in their blood had nearly doubled since the city switched its water source. While tests showed that the water leaving Flint's treatment plant was lead-free, by the time that water reached household taps it could still contain elevated levels of lead. This happened because the Flint River water was more corrosive to lead pipes than the previously used water source, Lake Huron; a study conducted by Virginia Tech professor Marc Edwards, a leading authority on water quality, showed that the Flint River water corroded lead pipes at 19 times the rate of water piped from Detroit. The city switched back to the Detroit water system on October 16, 2015. An extensive lead service pipe replacement effort has been underway in Flint since 2016.

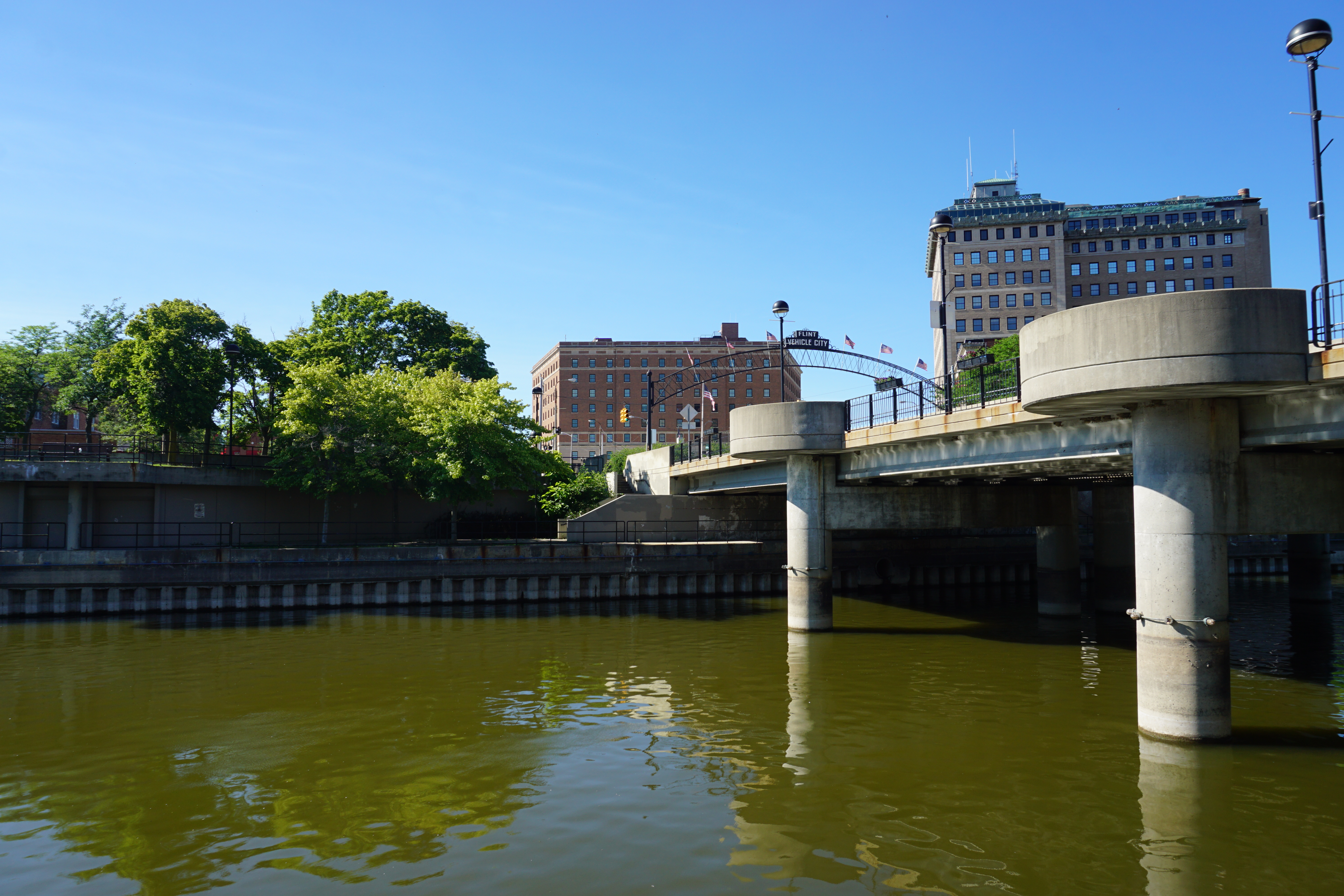
The Flint River in 2018

On August 20, 2020, the victims of the water crisis were awarded a combined settlement of $600 million, with 80% going to the families of children affected by the crisis. By November, the settlement grew to $641 million. As of July 16, 2021, 27,133 water service lines had been excavated and inspected, resulting in the replacement of 10,059 lead pipes. After $400 million in state and federal spending, Flint has secured a clean water source, distributed filters to all who want them, and laid modern, safe, copper pipes to nearly every home in the city.

== Cities and villages along the river ==
- Montrose, Michigan
- Flushing, Michigan
- Flint, Michigan
- Genesee, Michigan
- Columbiaville, Michigan
- Lapeer, Michigan
