= Saginaw and Clare County Railroad =

The Saginaw and Clare County Railroad was a wholly owned subsidiary of the Flint and Pere Marquette Railroad (F&PM). It was chartered on September 4, 1877, to construct a branch line to Lake George, Michigan. On September 30, 1880, the company completed a 15.5-mile (24.9 km) branch line from Harrison Junction (between Farwell and Clare along the main line) to Harrison. The line did not serve Lake George. In 1883 this line was extended north to Meredith (in Franklin Township), for a total length of 29.91 miles (48.14 km). The Saginaw & Clare County was consolidated with the F&PM on January 30, 1889.
