= Rio Grande class K-27 =

Class of steam locomotives

D&RGW K-27 Class
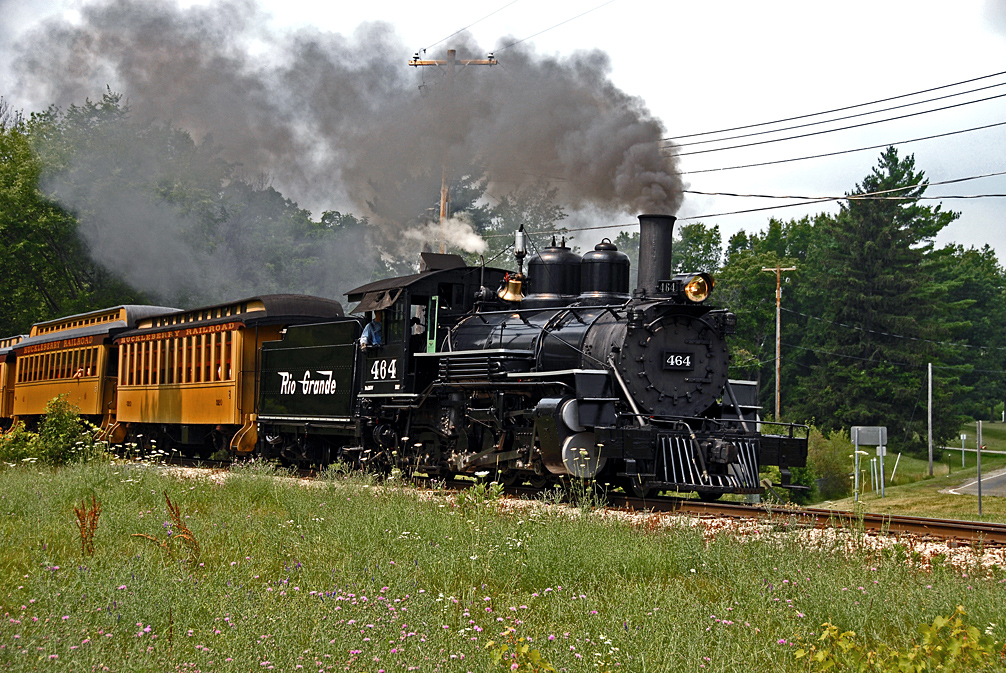
- D&RGW K-27 No. 464 at the Huckleberry Railroad
Type and origin
- Power type: Steam
- Builder: Baldwin Locomotive Works
- Model: 12-20 1/4 E
- Build date: February - April 1903
Specifications
- Configuration
  - Whyte: 2-8-2
  - UIC: 1′D1′ n4v, later 1′D1′ h2
- Gauge: 3 ft (914 mm)
- Leading dia.: 28 in (711 mm)
- Driver dia.: 40 in (1,016 mm)
- Trailing dia.: 28 in (711 mm)
- Wheelbase: 24.5 ft (7.5 m)
- Length: 33.7 ft (10.3 m)
- Adhesive weight: 105,425 lb (48 t)
- Loco weight: 136,650 lb (62 t)
- Fuel type: Coal
- Boiler pressure: 200 lbf/in^{2} (1.38 MPa)
- Cylinders: Original: Four; Vauclain compound, Later: Two, simple
- Cylinder size: Original: 13 in × 22 in (330 mm × 559 mm) and 22 in × 22 in (559 mm × 559 mm); Later: 17 in × 22 in (432 mm × 559 mm)
- Valve gear: see table
- Valve type: see table
- Loco brake: Air
- Train brakes: Air
- Couplers: Knuckle
Performance figures
- Tractive effort: 27,000 lbf (120 kN)
Career
- Operators: Denver & Rio Grande (D&RG); Denver & Rio Grande Western (D&RGW); Rio Grande Southern (RGS); Cumbres & Toltec Scenic (C&TS); Huckleberry Railroad
- Class: D&RG: 125; D&RGW: K-27
- Number in class: 15
- Numbers: 450–464
- Nicknames: Mudhen
- Locale: California, Colorado, Mexico, Michigan, New Mexico
- Retired: 1932–1962
- Preserved: Two (Nos. 463 and 464) preserved, remainder scrapped
- Restored: No. 463; 1994 (1st restoration); May 2013 (2nd restoration); No. 464; 1989
- Disposition: Operational (No. 463 on the C&TS and No. 464 on the Huckleberry Railroad)

The Denver and Rio Grande Western K-27 is a class of fifteen 3 ft (914 mm) narrow gauge 2-8-2 "Mikado" type steam locomotives built for the Denver and Rio Grande Railroad by the Baldwin Locomotive Works in 1903. Known by their nickname "Mudhens," they were the first and the most numerous of the four K classes of Rio Grande narrow gauge engines to be built. Two of the original fleet of fifteen survived into preservation and operate on heritage railways in the United States. No. 463 is operational on the Cumbres and Toltec Scenic Railroad (C&TSRR) in Chama, New Mexico and No. 464 is currently out of service due to a rebuild on the Huckleberry Railroad in Genesee Township, Michigan.

== Origins ==
Fifteen locomotives were built, originally class 125, they were reclassified as K-27s in 1924 when the Denver and Rio Grande became the Denver and Rio Grande Western Railroad. In the D&RGW's classification system, K was short for MiKado while 27 referred to the engine's 27,000 lbf of tractive effort. The K-27s were built as Vauclain compounds, with two cylinders on each side, expanding the steam once in the smaller cylinder and then a second time in the larger one. The extra maintenance costs of the two cylinders were greater than the fuel saving, so they were converted to simple expansion in 1907–1909. As a result, the K-27s were the Rio Grande's last purchase of compound locomotives. They were built with their main structural frames outside the driving wheels, with the counterweights and rods attached outside the frames.

They had one peculiarity which arose from their outside frames and counterweights. In places where the D&RGW's standard gauge system met the narrow gauge system, the railroad operated dual gauge trackage, with three rails, so that standard gauge equipment ran on the outer two rails and three foot gauge equipment ran on one of the outer rails and a third rail, inside the other two. Since the narrow gauge equipment was much lighter than the standard gauge, the inner rail was generally lighter and, therefore, not as tall as the standard gauge rails. In the case of the D&RGW, the difference was 7/8 inch (22 mm). Because the counterweights were outside the frames, they ended up directly over the standard gauge rail, with a clearance of only about 5/8 inch (16 mm). When the shop crews trued up the drivers periodically, they had to be very careful not to go too far.

They pulled freight, passenger and mixed trains on the D&RGW in and over the Colorado Rocky Mountains, traversing the entire length of the railroad. Many of them also spent time on the Rio Grande's subsidiary, the Rio Grande Southern. In later years, some were used as switchers at the D&RGW's yards in Durango, Gunnison and Montrose.

== Preservation ==
Two K-27s survive today.

=== 463 ===
D&RGW No. 463 was sold to cowboy actor and singer Gene Autry in May 1955. Autry never used the engine and donated it to the City of Antonito, Colorado. It was restored by and entered into service on the Cumbres and Toltec Scenic Railroad (C&TSRR) in 1994. It was taken out of service with a broken side rod in 2002. In 2009, it was moved to the railroad's shop at Chama, New Mexico where a major rebuild was performed. The engine made its inaugural run after the rebuild on the C&TSRR on May 20, 2013. No. 463 was added to the National Register of Historic Places in 1975 as Engine No. 463.

=== 464 ===
The other K-27 in existence is D&RGW No. 464. It was the last K-27 in service on the D&RGW, retiring from active duty in 1962. It sat outside in Durango, Colorado until it was sold to Knott's Berry Farm, an amusement park in Buena Park, California, in 1973. It saw little or no use there, in part because of its condition and in part because of the counterweight clearance problem described above. The Huckleberry Railroad in Genesee Township, Michigan, near Flint, acquired the locomotive in 1981, did an eight-year restoration on it, and put it into active service. It last saw steam in early 2019 and is currently awaiting its next overhaul.

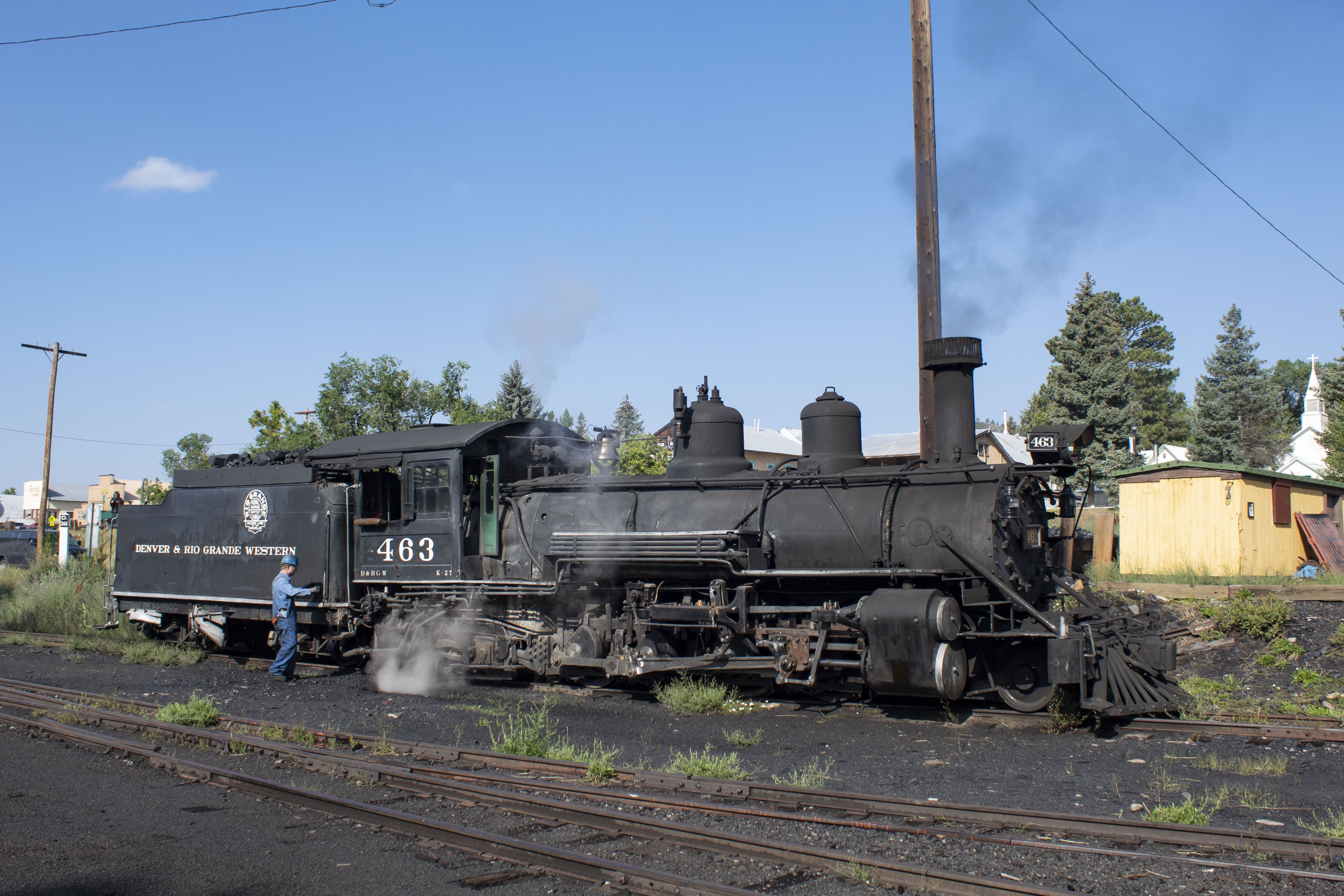
D&RGW 463 in Chama, New Mexico

== Details ==
The K-27s went through a variety of modifications during their years of service. They ended up in three distinct groups, with many different details such as the location of the air tanks, whether or not they had a doghouse on the tender for the head brakeman, and so forth. The most important of these details are:

Number	Builder's Number	Equipment after rebuild	Ultimate Disposition
450	21677	slide valve cylinders	Retired in 1932. Scrapped in 1939.
451	21685	slide valve cylinders	Retired in 1932. Scrapped in 1939.
452	21803	piston valves outboard of cylinders, Walschaerts valve gear, superheater	Retired in 1951. Scrapped in 1954.
453	21824	piston valves outboard of cylinders, Walschaerts valve gear, superheater, doghouse.	Used for switching at Durango, Colorado. Scrapped in 1954.
454	21832	piston valves inboard of cylinders, Walschaerts valve gear, superheater	Used for switching at Montrose, Colorado. Scrapped in 1953.
455	21845	piston valves outboard of cylinders, Walschaerts valve gear, superheater	Traded to RGS in 1939. Wrecked in 1943. Rebuilt in 1947 using parts from a standard gauge locomotive. Scrapped in 1953.
456	21854	piston valves inboard of cylinders, Walschaerts valve gear, superheater	Used for switching at Gunnison, Colorado. Scrapped in 1956.
457	21894	slide valve cylinders	Retired in 1932. Scrapped in 1939.
458	21910	piston valves inboard of cylinders, Walschaerts valve gear, superheater	Sold to National Railways of Mexico in 1941. Converted to standard gauge and renumbered 2251. Scrapped in 1957.
459	21936	piston valves outboard of cylinders, Walschaerts valve gear, superheater	Sold to National Railways of Mexico. Converted to standard gauge and renumbered 2250. Scrapped in 1963.
460	21728	slide valve cylinders	Retired in 1932. Scrapped in 1939.
461	21729	piston valves inboard of cylinders, Walschaerts valve gear, superheater	Sold to RGS in 1950. Scrapped in 1953.
462	21781	piston valves outboard of cylinders, Walschaerts valve gear, but did not have super heating	Scrapped in 1950. Tender preserved at the C&TS in Chama, New Mexico.
463	21788	piston valves outboard of cylinders, Walschaerts valve gear, superheater	Retired in the early 1950s. Sold to Gene Autry in 1955. Then static display at Antonito in 1971. Transferred to C&TS and restored to operating condition in 1994. Taken out of service in late 2002. Rebuilt between 2009 and 2013. Operational.
464	21796	piston valves outboard of cylinders, Walschaerts valve gear, superheater	Last K-27 in service. Used for switching at Durango, Colorado. Retired in 1962 and put on static display at Durango. Sold to Knott's Berry Farm in 1973. Then to Huckleberry Railroad in 1981. Restored to operating condition in 1989. The engine last saw steam in early 2019 and since then has been awaiting a rebuild.

== See also ==
- Rio Grande class C-19
- Rio Grande class K-28
- Rio Grande class K-36
- Rio Grande class K-37
