= Manistee Railroad =

Former railroad in Michigan

The Manistee Railroad in Michigan was a wholly owned subsidiary of the Flint and Pere Marquette Railroad (F&PM). It was established on June 19, 1880, to construct a branch line from the F&PM's main line (Ludington–Monroe) at Walhalla to Manistee. The completion of this line in 1883 gave the F&PM access to Manistee's lake trade and local salt mining operations. The Manistee Railroad was consolidated with the F&PM on January 30, 1889.
