= Violin Sonatas, K. 26–31 (Mozart) =

Six 1766 sonatas by W. A. Mozart

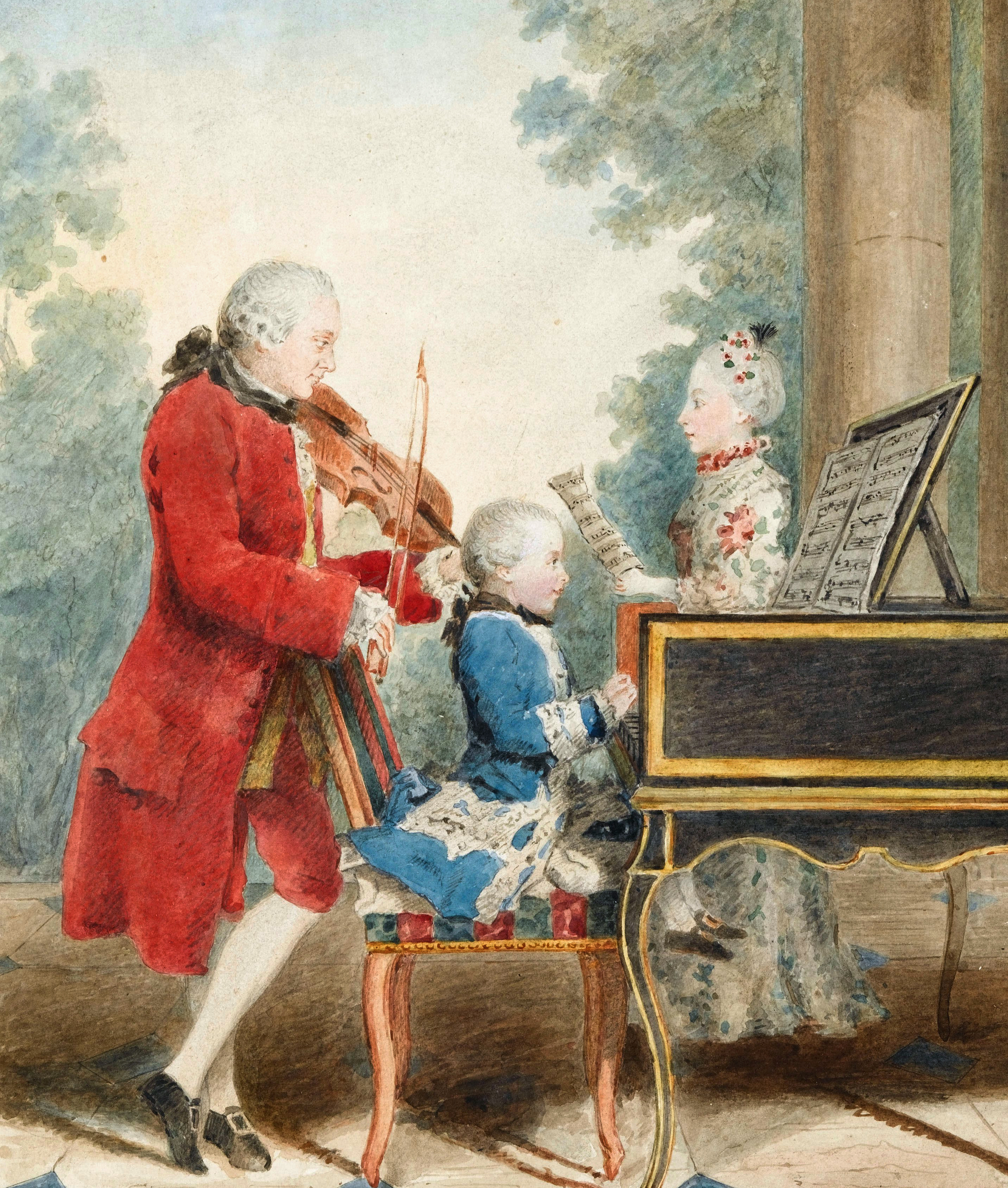
Detail of Carmontelle's Mozart family watercolour

Wolfgang Amadeus Mozart's set of six sonatas for keyboard and violin, K. 26–31 were composed in early 1766 in The Hague during the Mozart family's grand tour of Europe. They were dedicated to Princess Caroline of Nassau-Weilburg on the occasion of the eighteenth birthday of her brother, William V, Prince of Orange. They were published as Mozart's Opus 4.

These works show an improvement in compositional technique over the sets for Paris (K. 6–9) and London (K. 10–15), although like the previous sets, the keyboard part dominates and the violin may be considered optional.

Mozart composed all three early sets of accompanied sonatas while touring northwest Europe. These types of sonatas were not favored at home in Salzburg. Mozart would not revisit this genre until 1777–78 on a trip to Mannheim and Paris.

== Sonatas ==
=== Sonata in E♭ major, K. 26 ===
1. Allegro molto
2. Adagio poco andante (in C minor)
3. Rondeaux (Allegro)

=== Sonata in G major, K. 27 ===
1. Adagio poco andante
2. Allegro (middle section G minor)

=== Sonata in C major, K. 28 ===
1. Allegro maestoso
2. Allegro grazioso

=== Sonata in D major, K. 29 ===
1. Allegro molto
2. Menuetto and Trio (Trio in D minor)

=== Sonata in F major, K. 30 ===
1. Adagio
2. Rondeaux (Tempo di Menuetto)

=== Sonata in B♭ major, K. 31 ===
1. Allegro
2. Tempo di Menuetto (Moderato) Theme and six variations
