= Genesee Township, Michigan =

- Charter township
- Charter Township of Genesee
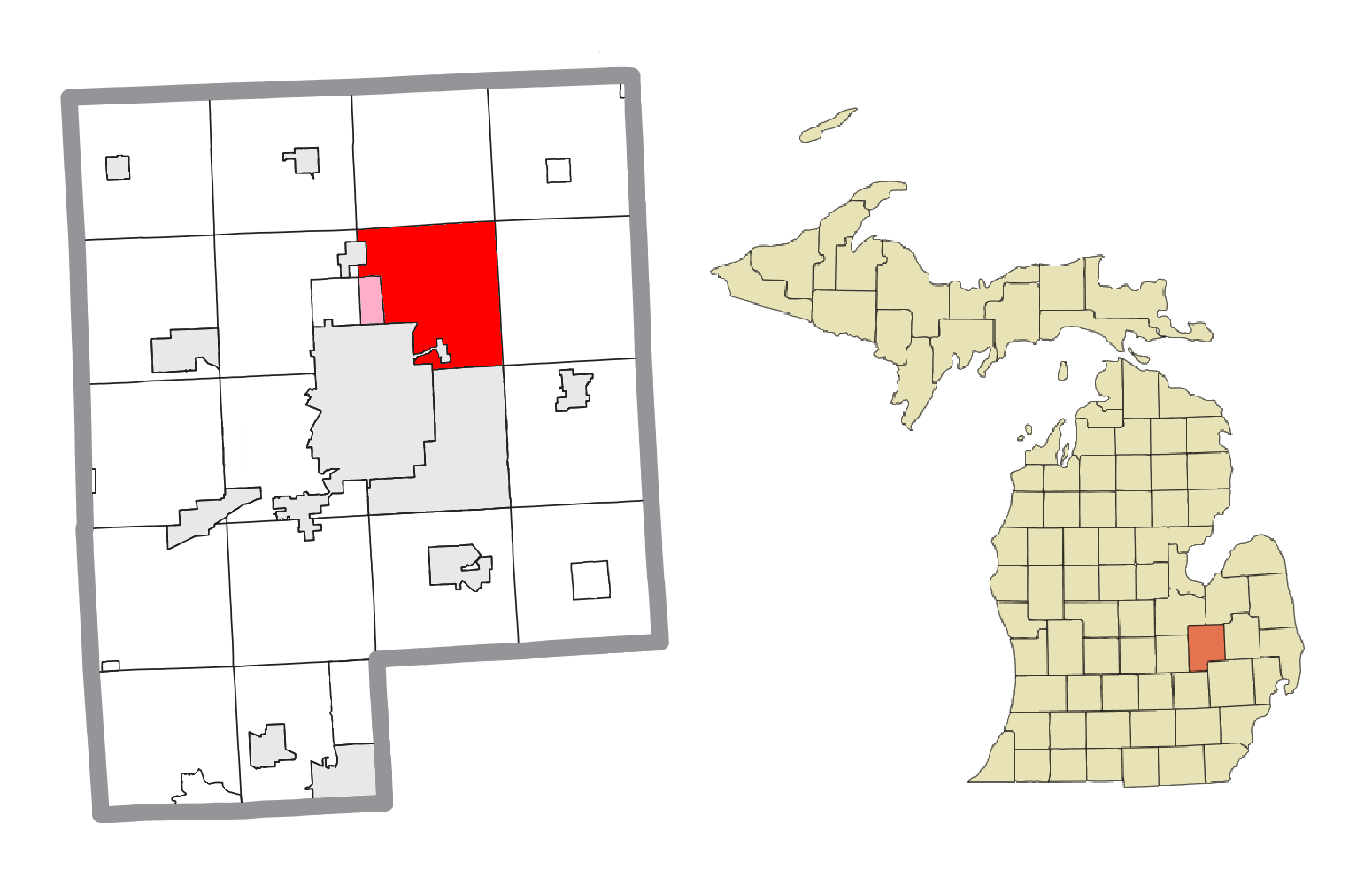
- Location within Genesee County (red) and an administered portion of the Beecher community (pink)

- Location within the state of Michigan
- Coordinates: 43°05′48″N 83°38′45″W
- Country: United States
- State: Michigan
- County: Genesee
- Settled: 1833
- Organized: 1838

Government
  - Supervisor: Steve Fuhr
  - Clerk: Wayne Bates
  - Treasurer: Todd Sorensen
  - Trustees: Thomas Jean; Richard Burrus; Kathy Sutton; Patricia Witte

Area
  - Total: 30.4 sq mi (78.7 km^{2})
  - Land: 29.4 sq mi (76.1 km^{2})
  - Water: 1.0 sq mi (2.6 km^{2}) 3.26%
- Elevation: 735 ft (224 m)

Population (2020)
  - Total: 20,581
  - Density: 700/sq mi (270/km^{2})
- Time zone: UTC-5 (EST)
  - Summer (DST): UTC-4 (EDT)
- ZIP code(s): 48420 (Clio); 48437 (Genesee); 48458 (Mount Morris); 48463 (Otisville); 48505, 48506 (Flint)
- Area code: 810
- FIPS code: 26-31800
- GNIS feature ID: 1626342
- Website: geneseetwpmi.gov

The Charter Township of Genesee, or Genesee Township, is a charter township of Genesee County in the U.S. state of Michigan. In the Public Land Survey System, the township is survey area township 8 north, range 7 east. The population was 20,581 at the 2020 census, down from 21,581 at the 2010 census.

== Communities ==
- Beecher is an unincorporated community in Mount Morris Township lying between the cities of Mount Morris and Flint. There is also a census-designated place with the same name defined for statistical purposes that covers the approximate area of the community. A portion of the CDP also lies within Genesee Township.
- Cold Water was an unincorporated community founded in 1833 by teetotalers. It was the location of the township's first school, formed in 1835.
- Genesee (formerly Geneseeville) is an unincorporated community named after Genesee County, New York as was the township and county with many settlers coming from there within the township at Genesee and Stanley Rds., just north of Mott Lake. It has its own school district and a post office with the ZIP code 48437. It is most known as the home of Crossroads Village and the Huckleberry Railroad.
- Large portions of the township are considered to be a part of the Flint urban area.

== History ==
Native Americans had no settlement in the area but in the northwest corner of section 11 established a graveyard. The graveyard was found when the railroad came through.

On March 9, 1833, Grand Blanc Township was organized as a multi-survey township areas including the current Genesee Township. The township earliest settlers, Luman Beach and Addison Stewart, came in 1833 in the area of Geneseeville. In September 1835, Sherman Stanley from Mount Morris, New York, started the Stanley settlement at the corners of sections 8, 9, 16, and 17 (now the intersection of Bray and Stanley Roads). In additional, several other families from that same city joined him there by 1838. A lumber mill was built with a dam in 1834 on the Kearsley Creek 1650 feet from the Flint River. This was followed by a second and third mills on Kearlsey in 1836 and 1837.

At Geneseeville, a forth mill was built on the Flint River in Geneseeville at the west side of section 11. Lot Clark and Stephen Warren, the mill builders, also got a charter granting them to build a dam for the mill. Later owners also build a companion grist mill in 1847.

This township area was transfer from Grand Blanc Township to newly created Flint Township on March 2, 1936. On July 19, 1837, Mount Morris had its post office open with Charles N. Beecher as its initial postmaster.

On April 2, 1838, Genesee Township organizational meeting was held in Cold Water settlement. Genesee Township at organization included the eastern half of the future Mount Morris Township. With Mt. Morris completely with in Genesee Township on January 19, 1839, its post office was renamed Genesee. Kearsley Township was formed on April 19. 1839 with several sections of Genesee. The state legislature merged Kearsley Township back into Flint Township on March 7, 1843 with its northern half absorbed by Genesee at some point. In 1955, the western third was split off to form Mount Morris Township. Geneeseeville was platted by Ruben McCury and Simon King in 1858.

On Monday November 27, 2017, the northern loop set of municipalities, including Genesee, began receiving water from the Karegnondi Water Authority pipeline and treated by Genesee County Drain Commission Water and Waste Division.

== Geography ==
According to the United States Census Bureau, the township has a total area of 30.4 square miles (79 km^{2}), of which 29.4 square miles (76 km^{2}) is land and 1.0 square mile (2.6 km^{2}) (3.26%) is water. The main streams of water are Flint River, Kearsley Creek and Butternut Creek. Lesser streams include Stanley Creek and Bray Brook.

== Demographics ==
As of the census of 2000, there were 24,125 people, 9,203 households, and 6,616 families residing in the township. The population density was 820.8 inhabitants per square mile (316.9/km^{2}). There were 9,936 housing units at an average density of 338.0 per square mile (130.5/km^{2}). The racial makeup of the township was 87.90% White, 8.18% African American, 0.67% Native American, 0.30% Asian, 0.01% Pacific Islander, 0.82% from other races, and 2.12% from two or more races. Hispanic or Latino of any race were 2.70% of the population.

There were 9,203 households, out of which 35.2% had children under the age of 18 living with them, 51.2% were married couples living together, 15.0% had a female householder with no husband present, and 28.1% were non-families. 23.4% of all households were made up of individuals, and 9.9% had someone living alone who was 65 years of age or older. The average household size was 2.62 and the average family size was 3.07.

In the township the population was spread out, with 27.8% under the age of 18, 8.2% from 18 to 24, 29.6% from 25 to 44, 21.5% from 45 to 64, and 12.9% who were 65 years of age or older. The median age was 36 years. For every 100 females, there were 95.1 males. For every 100 females age 18 and over, there were 90.5 males.

The median income for a household in the township was $39,440, and the median income for a family was $45,759. Males had a median income of $43,012 versus $23,553 for females. The per capita income for the township was $18,306. About 10.1% of families and 12.8% of the population were below the poverty line, including 18.6% of those under age 18 and 6.5% of those age 65 or over.

== Government ==
The township receives water from the Karegnondi Water Authority pipeline treated by Genesee County Drain Commission Water and Waste Division.

Genesee Township is part of the following:

- Genesee County Commissioner Districts 1, 3, 9
- Michigan House of Representatives District 48
- State Senate District 27
- 67th District Court Division 3
- Michigan's 8th Congressional District
- Genesee District Library

Educational services are primarily provided by Genesee School District, Kearsley Community Schools and Mount Morris Consolidated Schools while small parts of the township are served by Beecher Community School District.

== Public facilities ==
The Everett A. Cummings Center is an indoor/outdoor convention center and fairgrounds. It was built in 1968 as the permanent home of the Genesee County Fair, held every year at the complex. There are several buildings in the complex, including a 30,000-square-foot (3,000 m2) arena seating 3,000 in bleachers and a 96-foot (29 m)-by-300-foot (28,800-square-foot) exhibit building, along with an outdoor grandstand and an indoor arena. It is part of the Genesee County Parks and Recreation system. In addition to the Genesee County Fair, it is also used for equestrian and athletic events, trade shows, and other special events.

== Highways ==
- Interstate 475 runs north and south through the southwestern part of the township.
- M-54 (Dort Highway) runs north and south through the western part of the township.
