= China Railways HXD3D =

Class of Chinese electric locomotives

HXD3D 和谐3D型电力机车
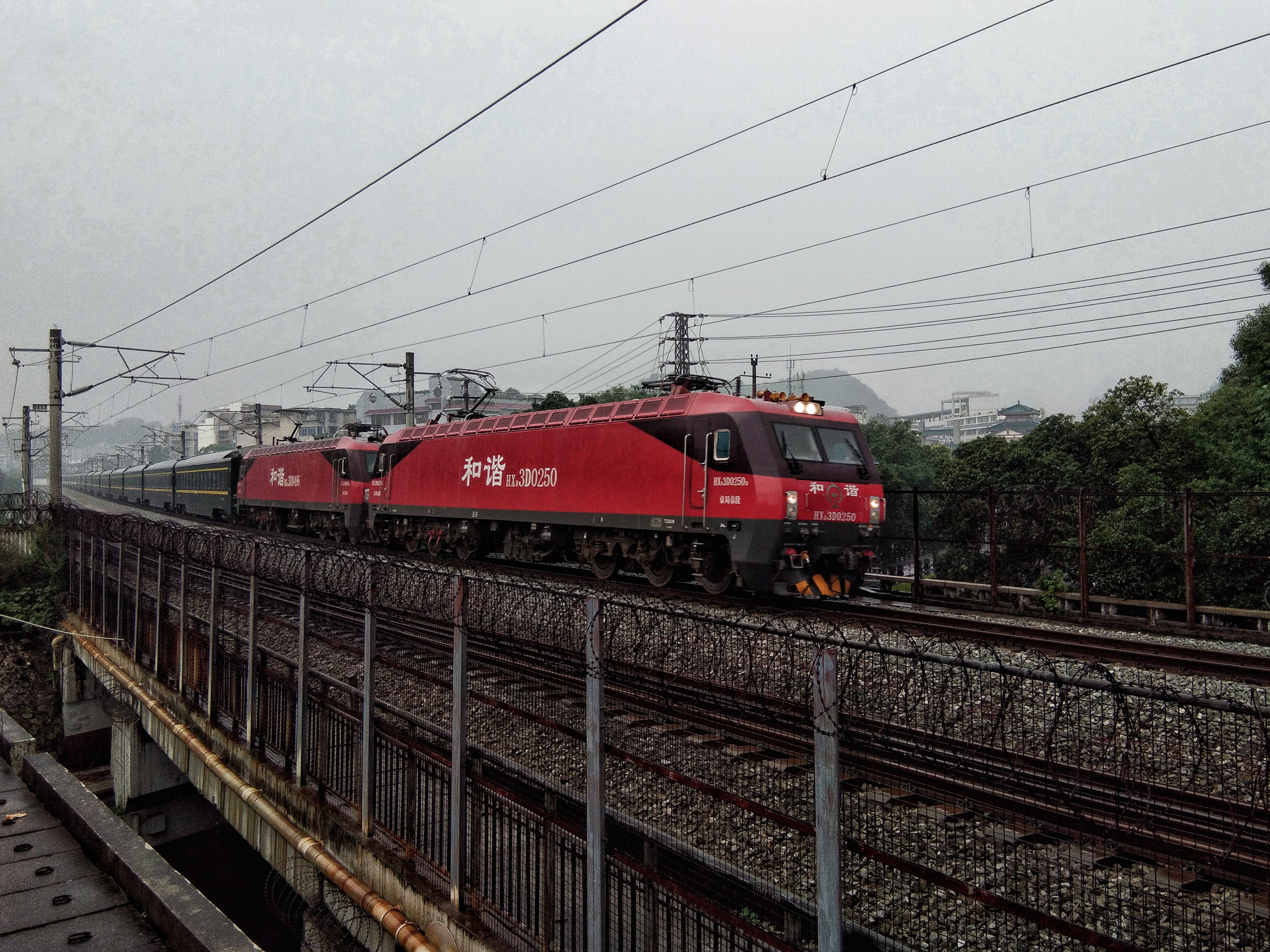
- HXD3D-0250 & HXD3D-0496 are double-heading haul Beijing–Nanning–Hanoi through train to Beijing West Railway Station.
Type and origin
- Power type: Electric
- Builder: CRRC Dalian Locomotive Co.Ltd
- Build date: 2012–present
- Total produced: 521
Specifications
- Configuration
  - UIC: Co′Co′
- Gauge: 1,435 mm (4 ft 8 1/2 in)
- Minimum curve: 125 m (410 ft 1 in)
- Wheelbase: 4,350 mm (14 ft 3 in) (Bogie wheelbase)
- Length: 22,989 mm (75 ft 5.1 in)
- Width: 3,100 mm (10 ft 2 in)
- Height: 4,100 mm (13 ft 5 in)
- Axle load: 21 t (20.7 long tons; 23.1 short tons)
- Adhesive weight: 100%
- Loco weight: 126 t (124 long tons; 139 short tons)
- Electric system/s: 25 kV 50 Hz AC Catenary
- Current pickup: Pantograph
- Traction motors: Six 3-Phase AC Traction Motors
- Transmission: AC-DC-AC
- Train heating: 2x 400 kW (540 hp) @ 600 volts
- Loco brake: regenerative and electro-pneumatic
- Train brakes: Pneumatic
Performance figures
- Maximum speed: 160 km/h (99 mph)
- Power output: 7,500 kW (10,058 hp) (continuous)
- Tractive effort: starting 420 kN (94,000 lb_{f}); 324 kN (73,000 lb_{f}) @ 80 km/h (50 mph); 162 kN (36,000 lb_{f}) @ 160 km/h (99 mph)
- Factor of adh.: 2.955 (33.8%)
- Brakeforce: regenerative: 250 kN (56,000 lb_{f}) from 14 to 104 km/h (8.7 to 64.6 mph); 162 kN (36,000 lb_{f}) @ 160 km/h (99 mph)
Career
- Nicknames: 彩虹 猩猩 番茄/西红柿

The HXD3D (Chinese: 和谐3D型电力机车) is a high power electric locomotive of China rated at 7.5 MW as it uses 6 Toshiba traction motors rated at 1.25 MW. The locomotive is produced by CRRC Dalian Locomotive Co. LTD. The HXD3D, similar to the HXD1D, is expected to alleviate the operational challenges associated with quasi-high-speed locomotives and to address the lack of actual quasi-high-speed applications for high-power AC locomotives in mainland China.

== Attachment of locomotive ==
Locomotive number	Attachment
HXD3D0001~HXD3D0010	Shenyang Locomotive Depot, Shenyang Railway Bureau
HXD3D0011~HXD3D0025	Xi'an Locomotive Depot, Xi'an Railway Bureau
HXD3D0026~HXD3D0040	Lanzhou Locomotive Depot, Lanzhou Railway Bureau
HXD3D0041~HXD3D0050	Xi'an Locomotive Depot, Xi'an Railway Bureau
HXD3D0051~HXD3D0070	Beijing Locomotive Depot, Beijing Railway Bureau
HXD3D0071~HXD3D0090	Nanchang Locomotive Depot, Nanchang Railway Bureau
HXD3D0091~HXD3D0115	Lanzhou Locomotive Depot, Lanzhou Railway Bureau
HXD3D0116~HXD3D0135	Kunming Locomotive Depot, Kunming Railway Bureau
HXD3D0136~HXD3D0145	Beijing Locomotive Depot, Beijing Railway Bureau
HXD3D0146~HXD3D0150	Ji'ning South Locomotive Depot, Hohhot Railway Bureau
HXD3D0151~HXD3D0155	Shenyang Locomotive Depot, Shenyang Railway Bureau
HXD3D0156~HXD3D0160	Nanchang Locomotive Depot, Nanchang Railway Bureau
HXD3D0161~HXD3D0165	Beijing Locomotive Depot, Beijing Railway Bureau
HXD3D0166~HXD3D0170	Xi'an Locomotive Depot, Xi'an Railway Bureau
HXD3D0171~HXD3D0180	Lanzhou Locomotive Depot, Lanzhou Railway Bureau
HXD3D0181~HXD3D0190	Jinan Locomotive Depot, Jinan Railway Bureau
HXD3D0191~HXD3D0245	Shenyang Locomotive Depot, Shenyang Railway Bureau
HXD3D0246~HXD3D0255	Beijing Locomotive Depot, Beijing Railway Bureau
HXD3D0256~HXD3D0265	Ji'ning South Locomotive Depot, Hohhot Railway Bureau
HXD3D0266~HXD3D0290	Lanzhou Locomotive Depot, Lanzhou Railway Bureau
HXD3D0291~HXD3D0300	Shenyang Locomotive Depot, Shenyang Railway Bureau
HXD3D0301~HXD3D0310	Jinan Locomotive Depot, Jinan Railway Bureau
HXD3D0311~HXD3D0315	Kunming Locomotive Depot, Kunming Railway Bureau
HXD3D0316~HXD3D0320	Nanchang Locomotive Depot, Nanchang Railway Bureau
HXD3D0321~HXD3D0325	Beijing Locomotive Depot, Beijing Railway Bureau
HXD3D0326~HXD3D0333	Xi'an Locomotive Depot, Xi'an Railway Bureau
HXD3D0334~HXD3D0340	Ankang Locomotive Depot, Xi'an Railway Bureau
HXD3D0341~HXD3D0355	Shenyang Locomotive Depot, Shenyang Railway Bureau
HXD3D0356~HXD3D0365	Ankang Locomotive Depot, Xi'an Railway Bureau
HXD3D0366~HXD3D0369	Beijing Locomotive Depot, Beijing Railway Bureau
HXD3D0370~HXD3D0382	Ji'ning South Locomotive Depot, Hohhot Railway Bureau
HXD3D1893	Fengtai Locomotive Depot, Beijing Railway Bureau
HXD3D7001~HXD3D7002	Nanning South Locomotive Depot, Shanghai Railway Bureau
HXD3D8001-HXD3D8025	Shenyang Locomotive Depot, Shenyang Railway Bureau
HXD3D8026~HXD3D8028	Taiyuan Locomotive Depot, Taiyuan Railway Bureau

== Named locomotive ==
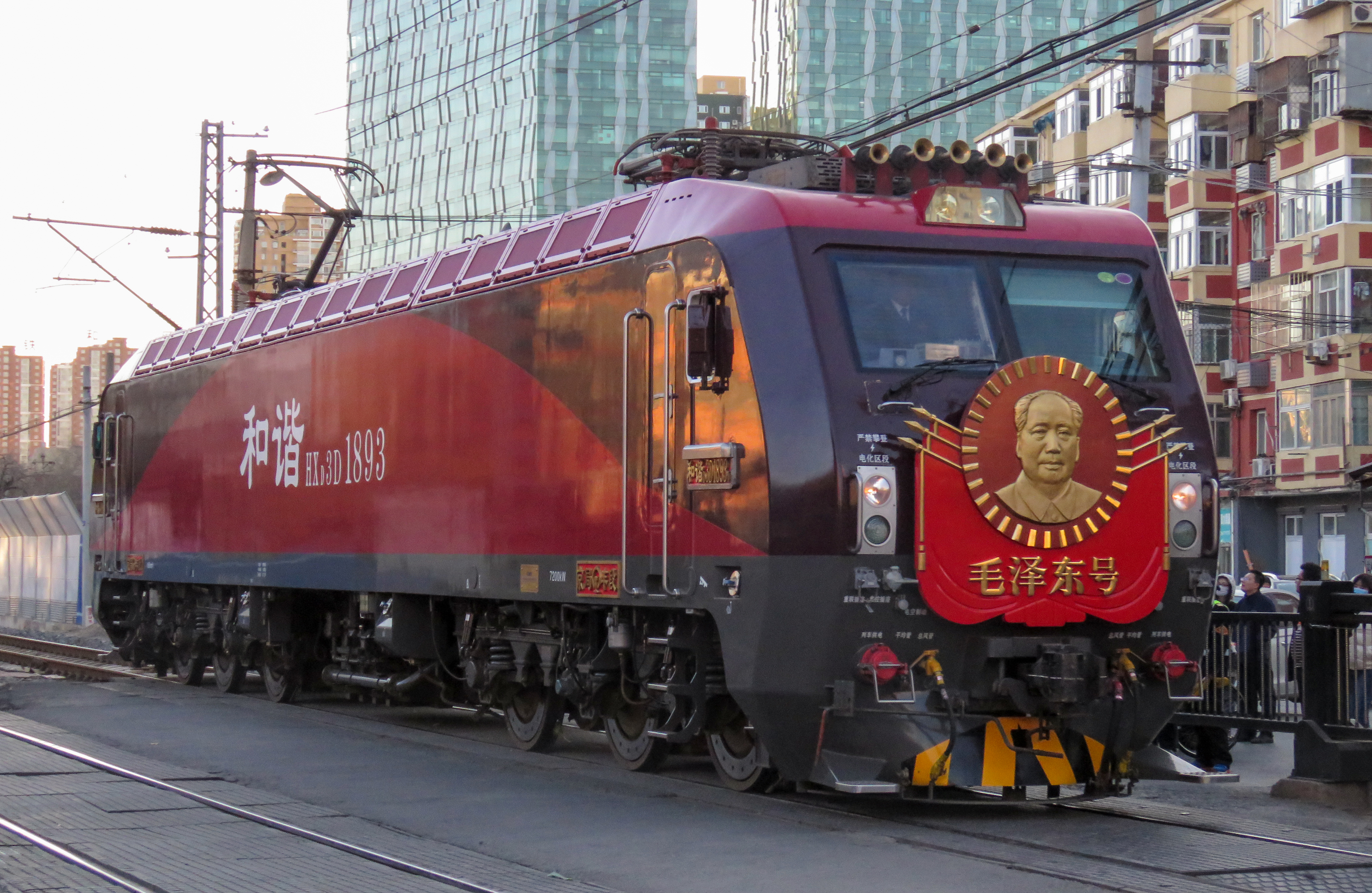
HXD3D-1893, the 6th generation "Mao Zedong Locomotive", with 50002 Train at Nongfusuo Level Crossing, Beijing in 2017.

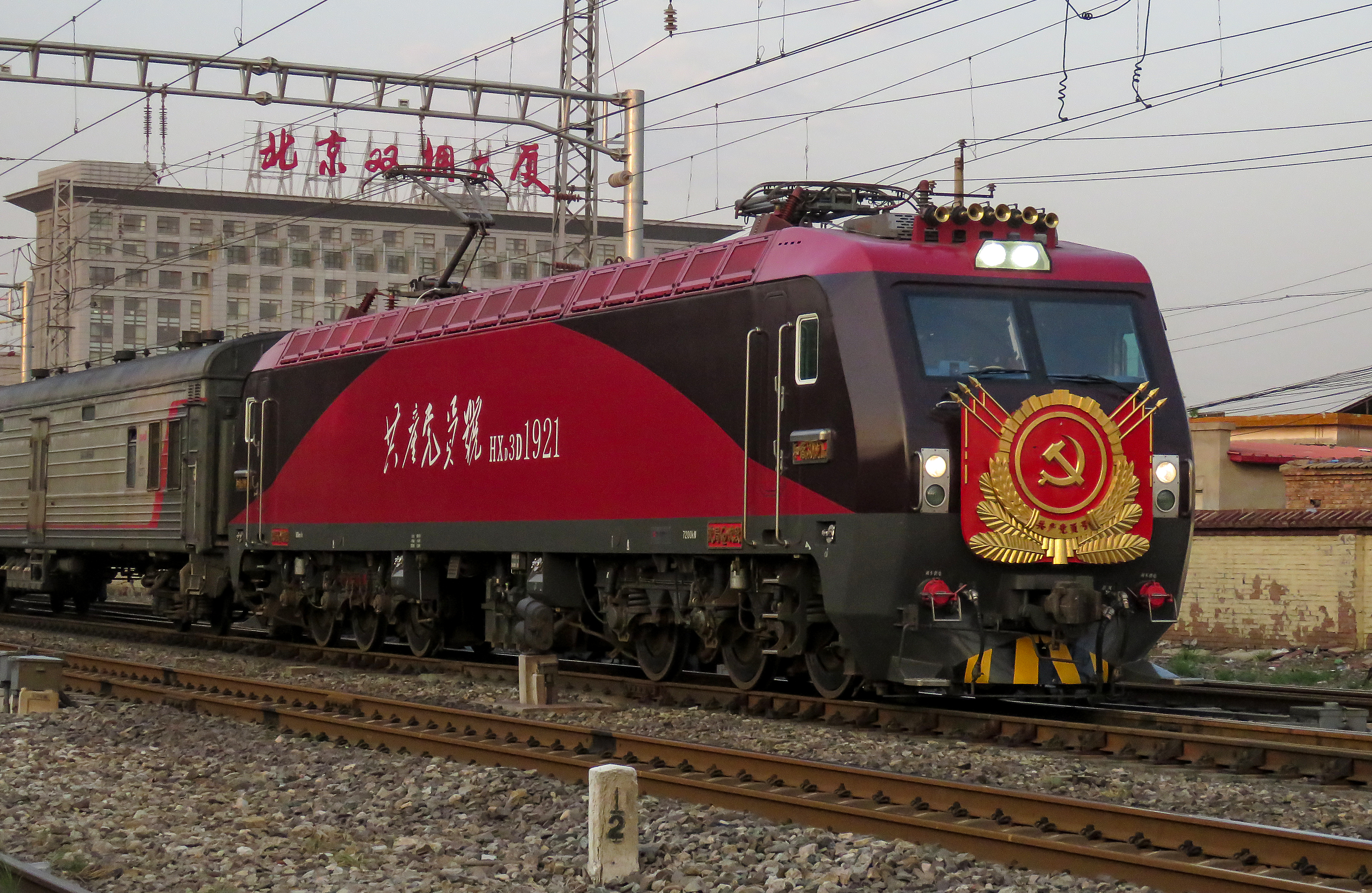
HXD3D-1921, the "Communists Locomotive", with K20 Moscow-Beijing train at Fengtai South signal base, Beijing in 2018.

- HXD3D-0035: "Lei Feng"
- HXD3D-0631: "Steel Man Iron Horse"
- HXD3D-1886: "Zhu De"
- HXD3D-1893: "Mao Zedong"
- HXD3D-1921: "Communist Party Member"

== Nickname ==
The first number locomotive (0001 number) and locomotive number 8001 have a "rainbow" paint coating. However, other locomotives are using the "orangutan" paint coating. It is known affectionately to Chinese railway fans as "tomato" because of its red paint.
