= Sublette, New Mexico =

Ghost town in Rio Arriba County

Sublette is a railroad ghost town in northern Rio Arriba County, New Mexico, United States, built as a section station in 1880. It is located north-east of Chama, just south of the Colorado state line and at milepost 306.1 of the former Denver and Rio Grande Western Railroad. When the Denver and Rio Grande abandoned its narrow gauge lines in the late 1960s, two parts of the system were preserved independently: the Cumbres & Toltec Scenic Railroad from Antonito to Chama, including Sublette itself, and the Durango and Silverton Narrow Gauge Railroad. Sublette sits at an elevation of 9,281 feet in the southeastern San Juan Mountains.

== History ==
The Denver and Rio Grande Railroad established Sublette in 1880 as a construction camp on its narrow gauge San Juan Branch. Once the line was completed, the camp served as a section crew station town, a base for the crew that maintained the track for the railroad. Structures included a section house for the foreman and his family, two bunkhouses for the section crew, a coal bunker, a speeder shed and a water tower.

The D&RGW operated trains over the branch until 1967, then in 1970 the Cumbres and Toltec Scenic Railroad took over the abandoned track between Chama, New Mexico, and Antonito, Colorado, to operate tourist trains in the summer months. The Friends of the Cumbres & Toltec maintain the remaining structures in the interests of historic preservation. The water tower was dismantled in 1937 and replaced with an underground cistern; C&TSRR trains stop here to take water.

== Nearby locations of interest ==
- Osier, Colorado 37°0′44″N 106°20′9″W
- Toltec Gorge, New Mexico 36°59′3.9″N 106°18′22.2″W
