= Cumbres Pass =

Mountain pass in Colorado, USA

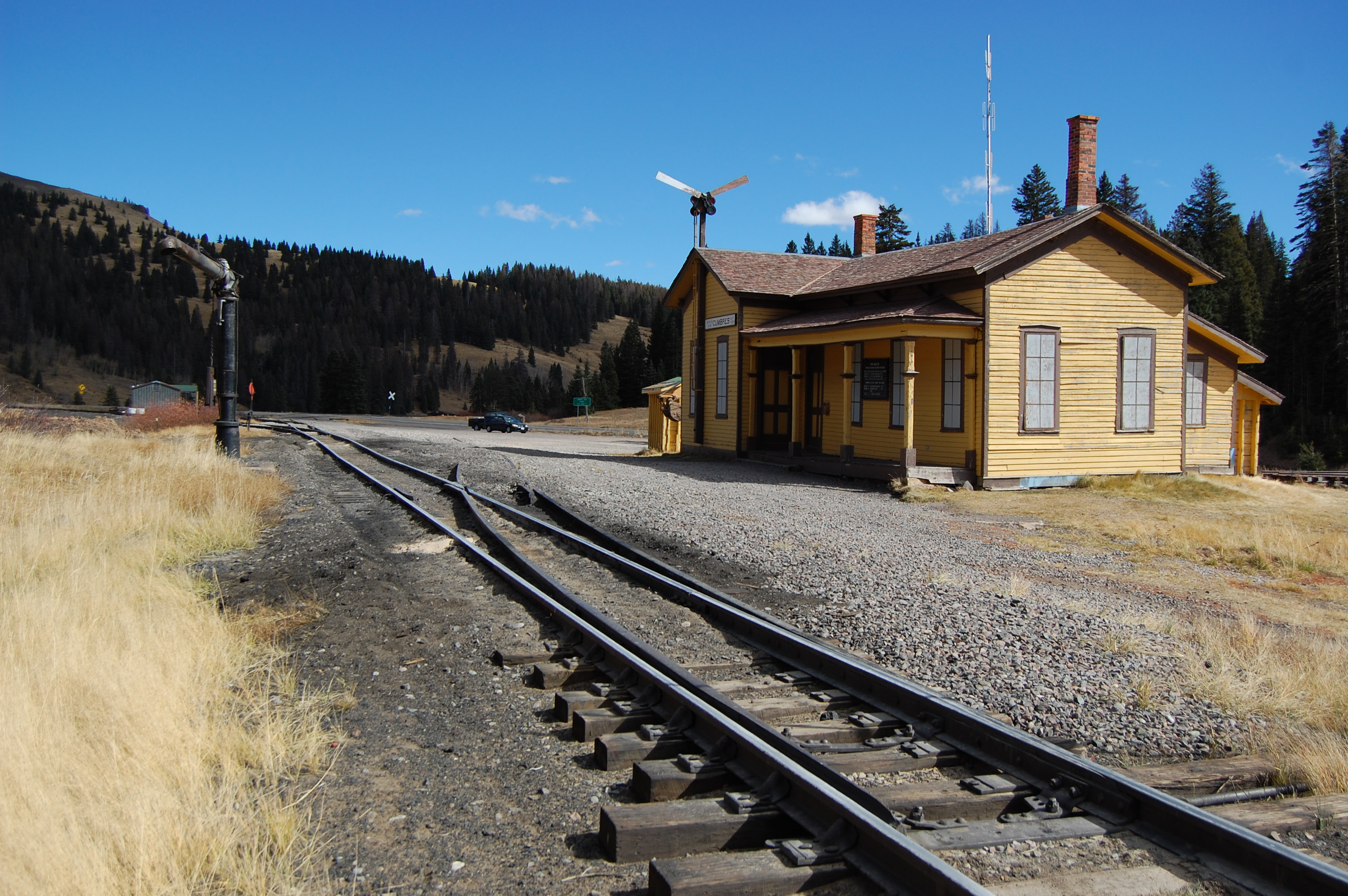
- Cumbres Pass on October 24, 2012
- Interactive map of Cumbres Pass
- Elevation: 10,022 feet (3,055 m)
- Traversed by: SH 17, Cumbres & Toltec Scenic Railroad

Third Approach
- Location: Conejos County, Colorado, U.S.
- Range: San Juan Mountains
- Coordinates: 37°01′14″N 106°27′00″W
- Topo map: USGS Cumbres

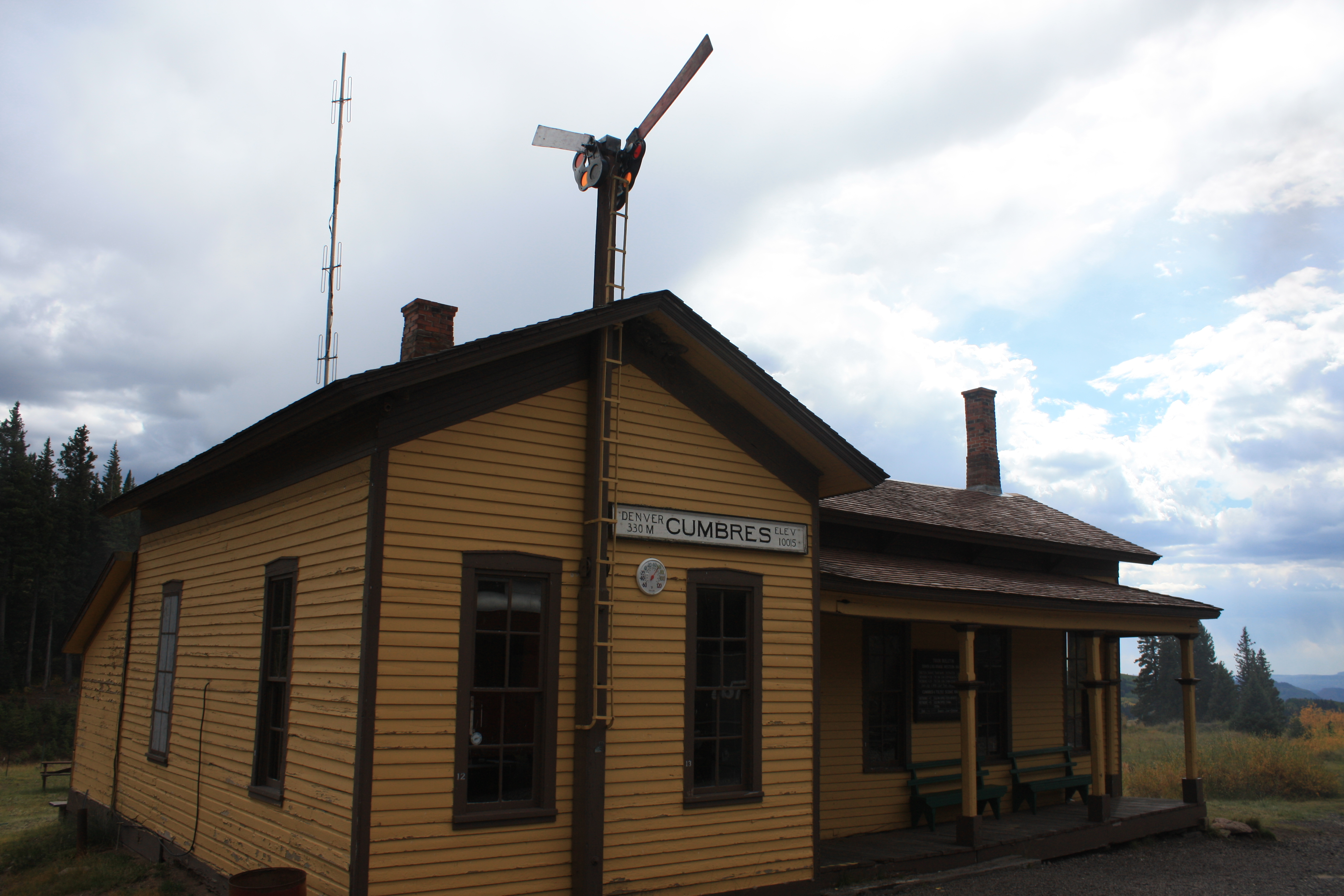
D&RGW Railroad Cumbres Section House, el. 10,015 ft.

Cumbres Pass, elevation 10,022 ft (3,055 m), is a mountain pass in the San Juan Mountains in Colorado, United States. The pass is traversed by State Highway 17 and the Cumbres and Toltec Scenic Railroad. The highway has a moderate 5.8% approach on the north side and a gentler, 4% approach on the south side. It is rarely closed in winter and does not normally cause problems for vehicles, since the road is not a major through highway.

== Railroad ==
The railroad line was built in the early 1880s by the Denver & Rio Grande Railroad as part of its San Juan Extension from Alamosa to Durango, Colorado. The railroad has a steep (for a railroad) 4% grade approaching from the west, so additional helper locomotives were usually run (and often still are) on trains from Chama, New Mexico to Cumbres Pass. The facilities at the pass were built by the railroad to support the turning of the helper locomotives for their return to Chama, and provide water to locomotives after the climb. Some of the structures at the pass, including the station building, were demolished when the highway was realigned. Regular passenger service was provided by the San Juan Express, running from Alamosa to Durango, which was discontinued in 1951, although numerous rail-fan specials operated over the line until September 1967. Freight service on the line ended in 1968 and since 1970 the railroad from Chama to Antonito has been owned and operated by the Cumbres and Toltec Scenic Railroad, which operates trains over the pass during the tourist season. The original section house, car inspectors house, and part of the old snowshed remain on Cumbres Pass and are maintained by the Friends of the Cumbres and Toltec Scenic Railroad. At present, no one lives at the summit of Cumbres Pass, though when the railroad operated as a common carrier line, railroad personnel were stationed at the pass full-time.

== Hiking ==
The Pass is on the Continental Divide Trail and represents a transition between states. Northbound hikers head toward Colorado's San Juan Mountain Wilderness while southbound hikers enter New Mexico's Carson National Forest.

== Climate ==
Cumbres Trestle SNOTEL is a weather station near the summit of Monarch Pass. Cumbres Pass has a subarctic climate (Köppen Dfc).

Climate data for Cumbres Trestle, Colorado, 1991–2020 normals: 10040ft (3060m)
Month	Jan	Feb	Mar	Apr	May	Jun	Jul	Aug	Sep	Oct	Nov	Dec	Year
Mean daily maximum °F (°C)	31.9 (−0.1)	34.3 (1.3)	42.3 (5.7)	48.2 (9.0)	56.1 (13.4)	66.3 (19.1)	70.8 (21.6)	68.5 (20.3)	62.0 (16.7)	50.9 (10.5)	39.4 (4.1)	31.1 (−0.5)	50.2 (10.1)
Daily mean °F (°C)	20.4 (−6.4)	22.8 (−5.1)	29.4 (−1.4)	35.5 (1.9)	43.5 (6.4)	52.3 (11.3)	57.3 (14.1)	55.6 (13.1)	49.4 (9.7)	39.5 (4.2)	28.5 (−1.9)	20.5 (−6.4)	37.9 (3.3)
Mean daily minimum °F (°C)	9.0 (−12.8)	11.2 (−11.6)	16.6 (−8.6)	22.8 (−5.1)	30.8 (−0.7)	38.4 (3.6)	43.8 (6.6)	42.7 (5.9)	36.9 (2.7)	28.0 (−2.2)	17.5 (−8.1)	9.9 (−12.3)	25.6 (−3.6)
Average precipitation inches (mm)	4.80 (122)	4.74 (120)	3.83 (97)	3.10 (79)	2.02 (51)	0.86 (22)	2.20 (56)	3.04 (77)	2.66 (68)	2.88 (73)	3.78 (96)	4.30 (109)	38.21 (970)
Source 1: XMACIS2
Source 2: NOAA (Precipitation)

== See also ==
- Chama, New Mexico
- Osier, Colorado
- Sublette Station
- Antonito, Colorado
