= Bite the Bullet (film) =

1975 film

- Theatrical release poster by Tom Jung
- Directed by: Richard Brooks
- Written by: Richard Brooks
- Produced by: Richard Brooks
- Starring: Gene Hackman; Candice Bergen; James Coburn; Ian Bannen; Jan-Michael Vincent; Ben Johnson
- Cinematography: Harry Stradling Jr.
- Edited by: George Grenville
- Music by: Alex North
- Production companies: Columbia Pictures; Persky-Bright Productions; Vista; Pax Enterprises
- Distributed by: Columbia Pictures
- Release dates: April 20, 1975 (Australia); June 25, 1975 (United States)
- Running time: 131 minutes
- Country: United States
- Language: English
- Budget: $4 million or $3.7 million
- Box office: $11 million

Bite the Bullet is a 1975 American Western film written, produced, and directed by Richard Brooks and starring Gene Hackman, Candice Bergen, and James Coburn, with Ian Bannen, Jan-Michael Vincent, Ben Johnson and Dabney Coleman in supporting roles.

Brooks called it "my love poem to America. I love those people and the beauty of our country."

== Plot ==
Based on actual events of the early twentieth century, the story concerns a grueling 700-mile (1,100 km) cross-country horse race in 1906, with a winner-take-all prize of $2,000 ($71,700 today), and the way it affects the lives of its various participants.

The fifteen colorful contestants include: two former Rough Riders named Sam Clayton and Luke Matthews who can't let friendship come between them if they intend to win; Miss Jones, a lady of little virtue; Carbo, a punk kid; Mister, an old cowhand in poor health; Sir Harry Norfolk, an English gentleman who's competing just for the sheer sport of it all; and a Mexican with a toothache who literally needs to bite the bullet. All must race against a thoroughbred of championship pedigree owned by Jack Parker, a wealthy man who has no intention of seeing his entry lose.

The film touches on the themes of sportsmanship, animal cruelty, the yellow press, racism, the end of the Old West and the bonds of marriage and friendship. As the race progresses, the conditions test not only the endurance of horses and riders but also their philosophies of life and the meaning of victory and defeat.

When Miss Jones helps free her beau Steve from a railway chain gang, they steal the contestants' horses and attempt to escape. The convicts are pursued and the riders get their mounts back, and the race is able to continue. Miss Jones, now free of her former boyfriend Steve's malevolent influence, rides away into the countryside.

In the end, with all but three of the contestants knocked out of the race, Clayton and Matthews cross the finish line together as co-champions, beating the championship thoroughbred by a matter of minutes to win the prize money, plus any side bets they had placed.

== Cast ==
- Gene Hackman as Sam Clayton
- Candice Bergen as Miss Jones
- James Coburn as Luke Matthews
- Ben Johnson as Mister
- Ian Bannen as Sir Harry Norfolk
- Jan-Michael Vincent as Carbo
- Robert Donner as Reporter
- Jean Willes as Rosie
- Mario Arteaga as Mexican
- Dabney Coleman as Jack Parker
- John McLiam as Gebhardt
- Robert Hoy as Lee Christie
- Jerry Gatlin as The Wood Cutter
- Sally Kirkland as Honey

== Production ==
The movie was the first announced from Columbia by its new management team of Peter Guber and David Begelman. It was Richard Brooks' first Western since The Professionals. Brooks claimed he always wanted Gene Hackman to star but Hackman was going to be busy making French Connection II. Columbia wanted Paul Newman or Steve McQueen. Brooks met with McQueen and then-wife Ali MacGraw, offering them both roles but she was unable to accept as she was pregnant. In December 1973, it was announced the film would star Paul Newman and Burt Reynolds.

However, Brooks later said that while Newman liked the story he did not think he was appropriate for the movie. Burt Reynolds was enthusiastic and did want to make the movie but Columbia did not think he was a big enough name at the time and wanted a well-known co-star. James Caan was interested in appearing with Reynolds but Columbia did not like that combination. Caan and Reynolds dropped out to do other films. Hackman read the script and wanted to do it. Fox agreed to push back French Connection II so he could make the movie.

Candice Bergen signed to play the female lead Miss Jones. Various names were discussed for the role of Luke Matthews including Sean Connery, Donald Sutherland and Bruce Dern (who Brooks wanted but Columbia did not). Brooks was also interested in casting James Coburn and Michael Moriarty but Columbia were not, asking for Steve McQueen, Charles Bronson or George Segal. Eventually Columbia agreed on James Coburn, who Brooks thought was often better than the material in which he appeared. (Coburn was shifting down to support roles around this time.)

Filming started 1 April 1974. The movie was filmed on location in New Mexico and Nevada and begins in a church in the small town of La Puente, New Mexico. There are numerous scenes of steam locomotives at work, shot along the Cumbres and Toltec Scenic Railroad narrow gauge railway between Chama, New Mexico, and Antonito, Colorado. Other scenes were filmed at the Carson National Forest, New Mexico; Taos, New Mexico; White Sands National Park, New Mexico; Lake Mead, Nevada; Valley of Fire State Park, Nevada. The film's title comes from the creation of an improvised cap made from a pistol cartridge casing ("bullet"), which is used to relieve the toothache of one of the participants in the horse race.

Gene Hackman later said one of his favorite scenes that he ever did in his career was in this film. It involved Candice Bergen. "I was telling her about my ex-wife, while standing around a waterhole in the middle of the desert," said Hackman. "I played it on horseback."

=== Factual inspiration ===
While the film's race is set in 1906, producer/writer/director Richard Brooks detailed that he was inspired by an actual $2,500 ($61,400 today), 700-mile (1,100 km) race, in 1908, created by the Denver Post (Western Post in the film), from Wyoming to Denver, Colorado.

== Release ==
The film was launched in Australia with a real life ride in Killmore.

== Reception ==
=== Box office ===
According to Variety, the film earned $5 million in theatrical rentals at the North American box office.

=== Critical ===
Vincent Canby of The New York Times was not impressed: "(It) is a big, expensive Western that doesn't contain one moment that might be called genuine. In spite of all the care, the money and the hardships that apparently went into its production, the movie looks prefabricated, like something assembled from other people's earlier, better inspirations." Canby did find the cinematography by Harry Stradling Jr. to be "spectacularly beautiful."

However, Roger Ebert of the Chicago Sun-Times liked the film: "Brooks is a proven master of the Western on a grand scale (the 1966 classic The Professionals was his) and Bite the Bullet is a film that reexamines and reaffirms the Western myth — both as it affected our history and as it has been considered in the movies. ...Bite the Bullet finds the traditional power and integrity of the Western intact after all." Likewise, Ebert was impressed with Stradling's cinematography.

On the review aggregator website Rotten Tomatoes, 68% of 73 critics' reviews are positive. The website's consensus reads: "Despite its over-reliance on well-worn genre cliches, Bite the Bullet's stunning scenery, unique premise, and solid performances fashion it into rollicking journey through the Old West."

== Awards ==
Bite the Bullet was nominated for two Academy Awards including Best Sound (Arthur Piantadosi, Les Fresholtz, Richard Tyler, Al Overton Jr.) and Best Music, Original Score (Alex North) at the 48th Academy Awards.

== See also ==
- List of American films of 1975
- List of films about horses
- List of films about horse racing
