= Biting the bullet =

Enduring an unpleasant but unavoidable situation

"Biting the bullet" is a metaphor which is used to describe a situation, often a debate, where one accepts an inevitable impending hardship or hard-to-refute point, and then endures the resulting pain with fortitude.

It has been suggested that it is derived historically from the practice of having a patient clench a bullet in their teeth as a way to cope with the pain of a surgical procedure without anesthetic. Evidence for biting a bullet rather than a leather strap during surgery is sparse. Francis Grose described this in A Classic Dictionary of The Vulgar Tongue in 1788. Harriet Tubman related having once assisted in a Civil War amputation in which the patient was given a bullet to bite down on. It has been speculated to have evolved from the British expression "to bite the cartridge", which dates to the Indian Rebellion of 1857, but the phrase "chew a bullet", with a similar meaning, dates to at least 1796.

The phrase was used in a literal sense in the 1975 film Bite the Bullet. One of the characters has a broken, aching tooth and cannot get treatment. He uses a shell casing to cover the exposed nerve; the slug was removed from the cartridge, the cap was hit to expend the charge, and the casing was cut down to allow it to sit level with his other teeth.
