= Cumbres and Toltec Scenic Railroad =

Heritage railroad in Colorado and New Mexico, US

Cumbres & Toltec Scenic Railroad

Overview
- Headquarters: Chama, New Mexico
- Reporting mark: C&TS
- Locale: Conejos County and Archuleta County in Colorado; Rio Arriba County in New Mexico; United States
- Dates of operation: 1970–present

Technical
- Track gauge: 3 ft (914 mm)
- Length: 64 miles (103 km)

Other
- Website: cumbrestoltec.com
- Denver & Rio Grande Railroad; San Juan Extension
- U.S. National Register of Historic Places
- U.S. National Historic Landmark District
- Colorado State Register of Historic Properties
- NM State Register of Cultural Properties
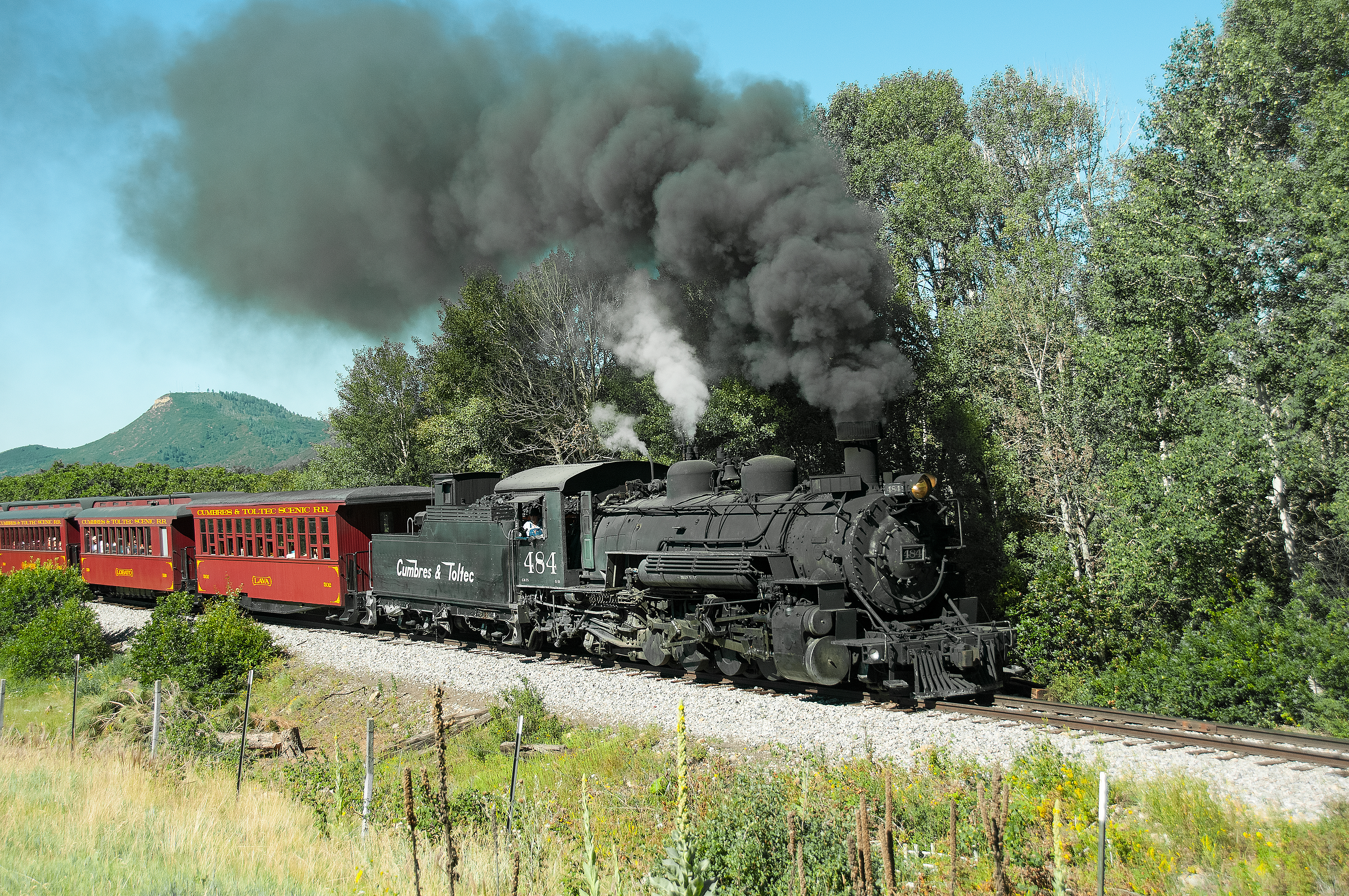

- Location within Colorado Location within New Mexico
- Nearest city: Antonito, Colorado, and Chama, New Mexico
- Coordinates: 36°54′N 106°35′W
- Area: 1,430 acres (5.8 km^{2})
- Built: 1880
- Architect: Denver and Rio Grande Western Railroad; Baldwin Locomotive Works
- Architectural style: Late 19th And Early 20th Century American Movements
- MPS: Railroads in Colorado, 1858–1948 MPS
- NRHP reference No.: 73000462 (original); 07000374 (increase)
- CSRHP No.: 5AA.664 / 5CN.65
- NMSRCP No.: 136

Significant dates
- Added to NRHP: February 16, 1973
- Boundary increase: April 24, 2007
- Designated NHLD: October 16, 2012
- Designated NMSRCP: November 20, 1969

The Cumbres and Toltec Scenic Railroad, often abbreviated as the C&TSRR, is a 3 ft (914 mm) narrow-gauge heritage railroad that operates on 64 miles (103 km) of track between Antonito, Colorado, and Chama, New Mexico, in the United States. The railroad is named for two geographical features along the route: the 10,015-foot (3,053 m)-high Cumbres Pass and the Toltec Gorge. Originally part of the Denver and Rio Grande Western Railroad's narrow-gauge network, the line has been jointly owned by the states of Colorado and New Mexico since 1970.

The C&TSRR is one of only two remaining parts of the former D&RGW narrow-gauge network, the other being the Durango and Silverton Narrow Gauge Railroad (D&SNG), which runs between Durango and Silverton, Colorado. The railroad has a total of 10 narrow-gauge steam locomotives (5 operational) and 2 narrow-gauge diesel locomotives on its current roster. The railroad also operates two smaller former D&RGW steam locomotives, Nos. 315 (owned by the Durango Railroad Historical Society) and 168 (owned by the City of Colorado Springs, Colorado), for special events and excursions.

== History ==
On February 20, 1880, track crews of the Denver and Rio Grande Railway (D&RG) began to lay the first rails of the San Juan Extension going south from Alamosa, Colorado, toward Antonito, Colorado, arriving in March of that year. The company chose the narrow gauge of three feet instead of the standard gauge of four feet eight and a half inches. This was because narrow gauge was cheaper to build, and narrow gauge railways can accommodate tighter-radius curves. This allowed laying track where standard gauge would not fit. From Antonito, the line continued west to Chama, New Mexico, arriving there on December 31, 1880. The track had come 64 miles (103 km) through two tunnels, over a 10,015-foot (3,053 m) mountain pass, and skirted a 600-foot gorge. The line then went on towards Durango, Colorado. The purpose of this extension was to tap into the mineral resources around the Silverton, Colorado area.

When the Denver and Rio Grande Western Railroad arrived in Chama, other railroad companies were formed to take advantage of the local forests. This created a flourishing logging economy for the town. There were lumber mills located to the west and south of Chama. These mills provided a steady stream of revenue for the railroad, lasting until abandonment in the late 1960s.

After World War II, there was an oil boom in Farmington, New Mexico. This boom provided a surge of revenue for the railroad. This revenue came from 60-car pipe trains heading west from Antonito. The Gramps Oil Fields in southern Colorado supplied oil for trains running from Chama to Antonito. The lumber mills also provided a steady stream of revenue, although this was less important than oil. This increase in revenue saved the line from abandonment.

All of these successes had drawbacks. The major issue with the line was Cumbres Pass itself. Cumbres Pass is 10,015 feet (3,053 m) above sea level. The high elevation and various other factors led to many terrible snowstorms. This prompted the railroad to purchase "rotary snowplows". The two that were used on the Cumbres Pass line were Rotary OM and Rotary OY. Both rotaries still exist in Chama, New Mexico, but historically they were dispatched from Alamosa. Every five or six years, the winter season can bring as much as 500 inches of snow to Cumbres. These snowstorms were a huge financial burden for the railroad. The "Granddaddy of All Snowstorms" hit in the winter of 1951–1952. This was the worst recorded winter on the line and one of the deciding factors when abandonment was considered in the 1960s.

In September 1968, the Denver and Rio Grande Western Railroad filed for abandonment of its narrow-gauge lines. In April 1969, legislation was signed in New Mexico that authorized the state to purchase the track between Chama and Antonito. In 1970, Colorado passed similar legislation. The two states jointly owned the line and, by 1971, the Cumbres and Toltec Scenic Railroad was formed.

=== Notable incidents ===
==== 2002 shutdowns ====
In 2002, the C&TSRR was shut down twice, first in the spring to resolve track bed issues. In the summer, operations were suspended again due to wildfire risks.

==== Lobato trestle fire ====
On June 23, 2010, an unknown fire severely damaged Lobato Trestle, a deck girder bridge located approximately four miles (6.4 km) east of Chama. While the bridge was out of service, the C&TSRR operated limited services from the Chama end while trains from Antonito only traveled to Osier and back. After undergoing extensive refurbishment, the bridge was reopened on June 20, 2011.

==== 2023 lawsuits ====
In December 2023, some former Cumbres & Toltec employees filed a lawsuit against the railroad alleging discrimination.

=== National Historic Landmark ===
In 1973, the Cumbres and Toltec Scenic Railroad was listed on the National Register of Historic Places and its boundaries were increased in 2007. The railroad was designated as a National Historic Civil Engineering Landmark by the American Society of Civil Engineers in 1976. In 2012, the railroad was designated a National Historic Landmark, for its engineering, well-preserved infrastructure and equipment and the role of the railroad in the development of the region it served.

== Current operations ==
The Cumbres and Toltec Scenic Railroad operates between late May and late October, with two trains (one in each direction) departing each morning from Antonito, Colorado, and Chama, New Mexico. Both trains meet at Osier, Colorado, for lunch. At Osier, lunch is served in a modern dining hall to passengers. From there, passengers can either continue to the other side of the railroad or switch trains and return to their point of origin. Once the westbound train arrives at Cumbres Pass, passengers can board motorcoaches to return to Antonito, or they can save an hour and continue to Chama. The Continental Divide Trail also passes through Cumbres Pass. The railroad offers these hikers a ride down the mountain from the pass if desired. At the end of the day, motorcoaches are again provided for passengers who arrived from the opposite end. The motorcoach ride is about one hour long.

In addition to the through service, the C&TSRR operates various special excursions during the season, such as dinner trains. On certain days during the holiday season, the railroad offers special "Santa Trains" from both Chama and Antonito, and guests are encouraged to bring gifts and/or food for the less fortunate.

=== Operator changes ===
After the C&TSRR was formed in 1971, a bi-state agency, the Cumbres and Toltec Scenic Railroad Commission, was created. Railroad operations were then contracted to third-party rail operators. In 2012, after long discussions with other third parties bidding to take over, the Commission formed its own operating company, Cumbres and Toltec Operating LLC They hired John Bush, a veteran of the railroad, to become president on December 13, 2012. Bush retired on November 14, 2020.

==== Friends of the C&TSRR ====
In 1988, a nonprofit organization called the Friends of the Cumbres and Toltec Scenic Railroad was established to preserve the railroad's history and help maintain its infrastructure and rolling stock. The Friends of the C&TSRR also participates in various education programs and provides the railroad guides, known as docents, who inform passengers about the railroad's historical aspects and locations of interest.

== Route description ==
=== Locations along the line ===
- Chama, New Mexico 36°54′N 106°35′W
- Cumbres Pass 37°1′N 106°27′W
- Osier, Colorado 37°1′N 106°20′W
- Toltec Gorge, New Mexico 36°59′N 106°18′W
- Sublette Station 36°59′N 106°14′W
- Antonito, Colorado 37°4′N 106°1′W

=== Chama to Osier ===
==== Chama Yard ====
The Chama yard is located at milepost 344.12. Here, the railroad stores most of its freight cars and both rotary snowplows, Rotary OY and Rotary OM. On the east side is part of the original D&RGW roundhouse. A fire destroyed most of the roundhouse years ago; what remains is used to store parts. K-37 locomotive No. 497 is currently stored here. On the far side of the old roundhouse section are the shops where the engines are serviced and prepared for the next day. The shops have two stalls and can hold two engines inside simultaneously. On the west side of the yard is the original depot from the late 1800s, where train tickets can be purchased. There is a gift shop with a variety of items for sale. On the south end of the yard, over 100 freight cars are visible. The yard is open to the public and can be toured. About 40 of the cars in the yard are operational.

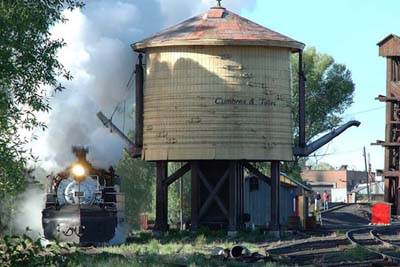
C&TSRR No. 487 in the Chama Yard

From Chama, the railroad proceeds northeast after crossing the Rio Chama. About one mile (1.6 km) later, the railroad begins up the mountain on a grade averaging 4%. The first siding on the line is at Lobato (MP: 339.99). Here are remnants of a stock pen and a water tank made for a movie in the 1980s. The tank was used later in Indiana Jones and the Last Crusade. The water tank was knocked over in 2006, succumbing to age and high winds. Lobato Trestle, located at Lobato, is the second-highest trestle on the line and was built in 1883. Due to weight restrictions, only one locomotive at a time is allowed to cross. Hence, all double-headers must separate and rejoin on the other side. The bridge was rebuilt in 2011 after a fire nearly destroyed it.

From here to Cumbres, the railroad operates on the north side of Wolf Creek. There are several old stations along the line. The first is Dalton (MP: 335.5). There is nothing at Dalton besides the station sign. Next on the journey to the top at Cumbres, the train passes Cresco Siding and water tank (MP 335.5). Just before this, the track crosses the state line for the first time. This water tank is used when operating smaller engines, such as No. 315 and No. 168, and for rotary trains. The route then enters a small canyon past Hamilton's Point. Exiting the canyon, the track turns northwest and climbs Wolf Creek through Coxo. At Coxo, there is a short siding for maintenance equipment and a station sign. At a narrow point of the valley, the track makes a horseshoe turn up to Windy Point. Windy Point is an outcrop of volcanic rock where the wind blows so hard that the smoke from the trains often blows towards the front of the train instead of the rear. This is less than a quarter of a mile from Cumbres Pass, the highest point on the line.

At Cumbres (MP 330.60), elevation 10,015 ft (3,053 m), is the Car Inspector's House, Water Standpipe, remnants of the extensive snow shed, and the Section House, which replaced the original depot after it was demolished in the 1950s. Cumbres is the highest point on the railroad and the highest elevation of any narrow-gauge railroad in North America. Upon reaching the pass, the engine must take on water, as it has used about 3/4 of its supply. After taking on water and a short brake test, the train departs to the east and begins the downhill section. At "Tanglefoot Curve", the track doubles back on itself to lose elevation gradually. Here, trains descending will perform a boiler blowdown. This is where the engine releases steam from the boiler to clear sediments at the bottom of the boiler. From there, the track turns north up the Los Piños Valley.

The track continues a gentle descent on the average 1.45% grade to the north until it reaches the Los Piños tank. This tank is always full and is used for small engines and rotary trains. The track takes a gentle loop off to the west and comes back to the east at the station of Los Piños (MP: 324.8). There is nothing here except a siding and the station sign. The track then turns back north towards Osier, Colorado. Just before Osier, at Milepost 320, the track crosses Cascade Trestle. This is the highest trestle on the entire line, sitting at 137 ft (42 m) above the river below. The train then stops at Osier, Colorado (MP: 318.40), where passengers are served lunch in a modern, wooden indoor facility.

=== Antonito to Osier ===
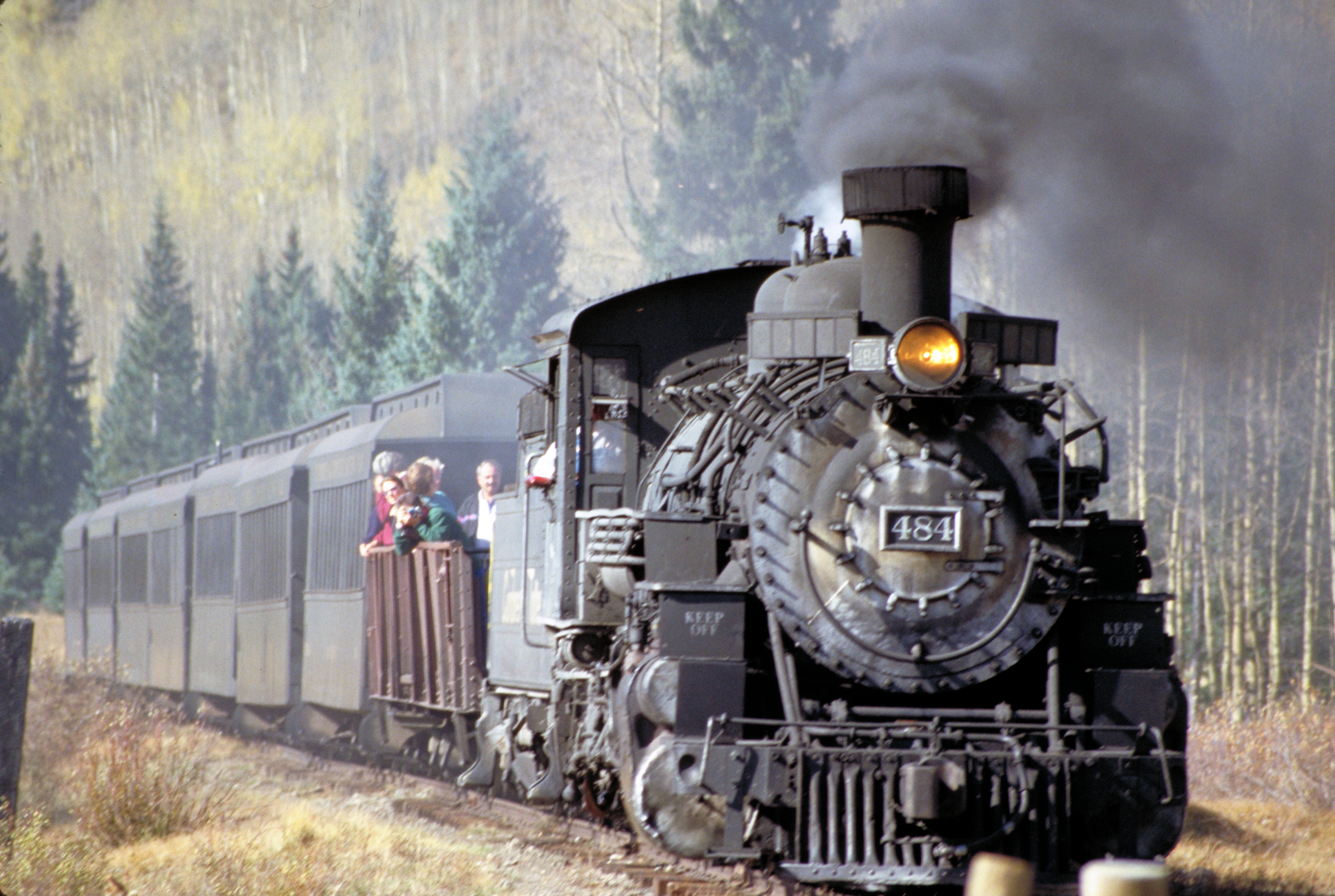
C&TSRR steam locomotive No. 484

This section covers the eastern portion of the line, from the small cattle and junction town of Antonito to Osier, the midpoint of the line.

Antonito (MP 280.70) is a small company town of the former railroad main line. It is home to the C&TSRR car shop, a water tank, and other relics. Most of the facilities were built by the C&TSRR, since the original rail yard, wye, and station were not sold to the states of Colorado and New Mexico.

Shortly after leaving the station, the train heads straight for three miles (4.8 km) until coming into some hills. Shortly thereafter, the train crosses Ferguson's Trestle (MP 285.87), named for a man who was hanged from a locomotive there. The original trestle was featured in the 1988 television movie Where the Hell's That Gold?, starring Willie Nelson and Delta Burke. In filming, an explosion mishap occurred, and the bridge was burned down. Traffic was halted for a week while the C&TSRR built a temporary bridge. Next winter, the trestle was rebuilt to match the original. About three miles (four point eight kilometres) later, the train makes the first of 11 crossings into New Mexico and climbs a ledge up to a lava mesa. Lava (291.55) has the old water tank from Antonito, which was moved here in 1971. The track goes around a horseshoe curve that is also used as a reversing loop to turn the rotary snow plow trains from Chama.

Heading west, the track rounds Whiplash Curve, a double-horseshoe curve. About one mile (1,600 m) from Whiplash Curve lie the sidings and wye at Big Horn. Past Big Horn, the train loops around the sides of mountains, going through horseshoe curves before reaching the first water stop at Sublette.

Sublette is an abandoned railroad section camp consisting of a log bunkhouse, a section house, a siding, and other buildings. There was once a water tank at the western end of the siding. Today, in its place, there is a standpipe. After the tender is filled with water, the train slowly creeps into lush aspen groves.

Following Sublette is Toltec Siding, which in the 1950s was the meeting place for oil well pipe trains moving between Chama and Farmington to Alamosa. Shortly afterwards, trains pass through Mud Tunnel, which is unique because it is lined with wooden pillars, as it was bored through soft volcanic ash. When the beams in the tunnel collapsed, the D&RGW made a "shoo fly" (a temporary bypass) to allow passengers and small cars to be moved around the tunnel to an awaiting train. After passing through this, trains pass around Phantom Curve and through Calico Cut, then slow down as they enter the longer Rock Tunnel. Trains exit the tunnel entering Toltec Gorge, where the track is 600 ft (180 m) above the river. The line then follows the river to Osier.

Line's terminus in Antonito

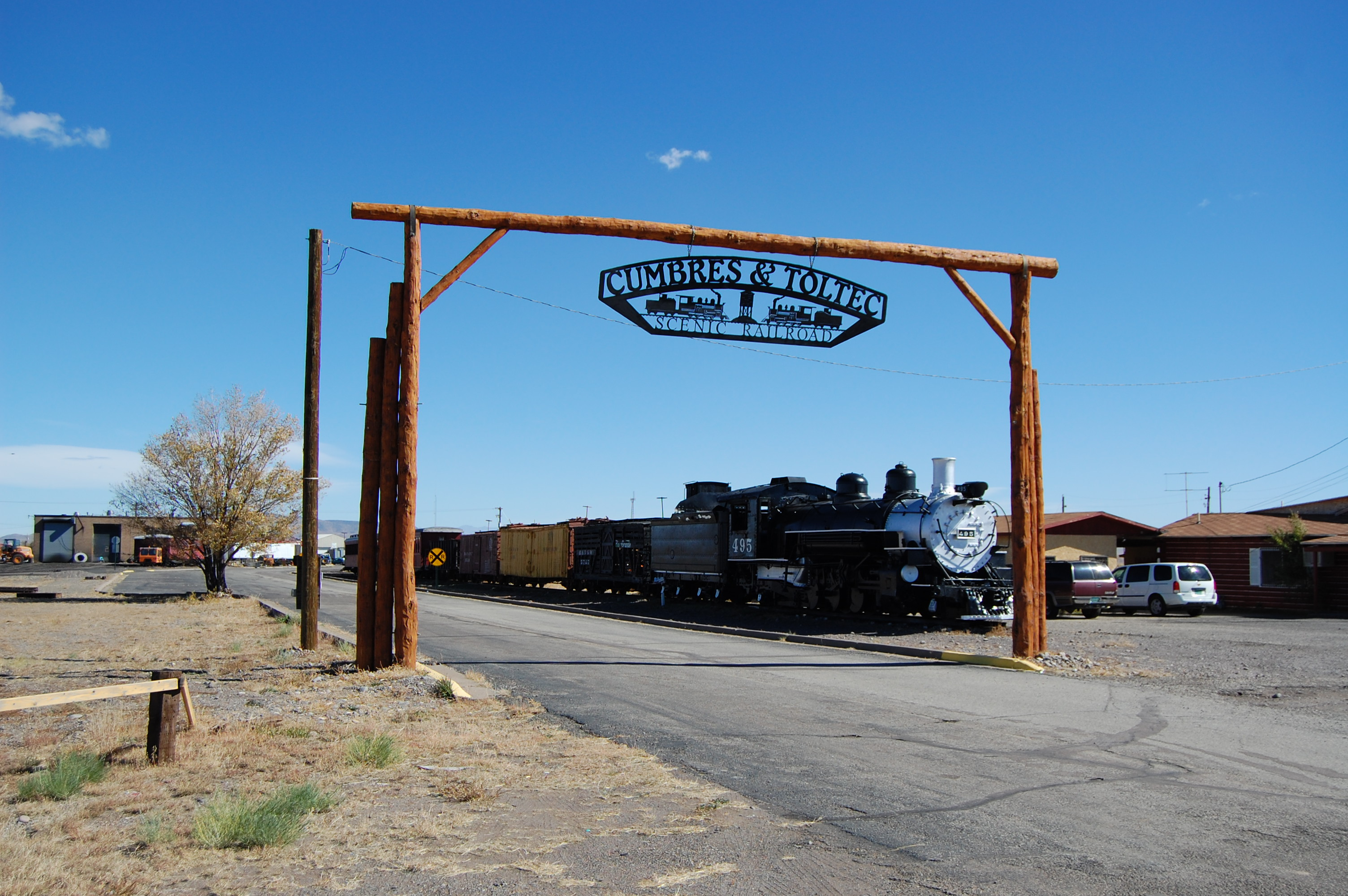
The entrance to the C&TS yard in Antonito, October 2012

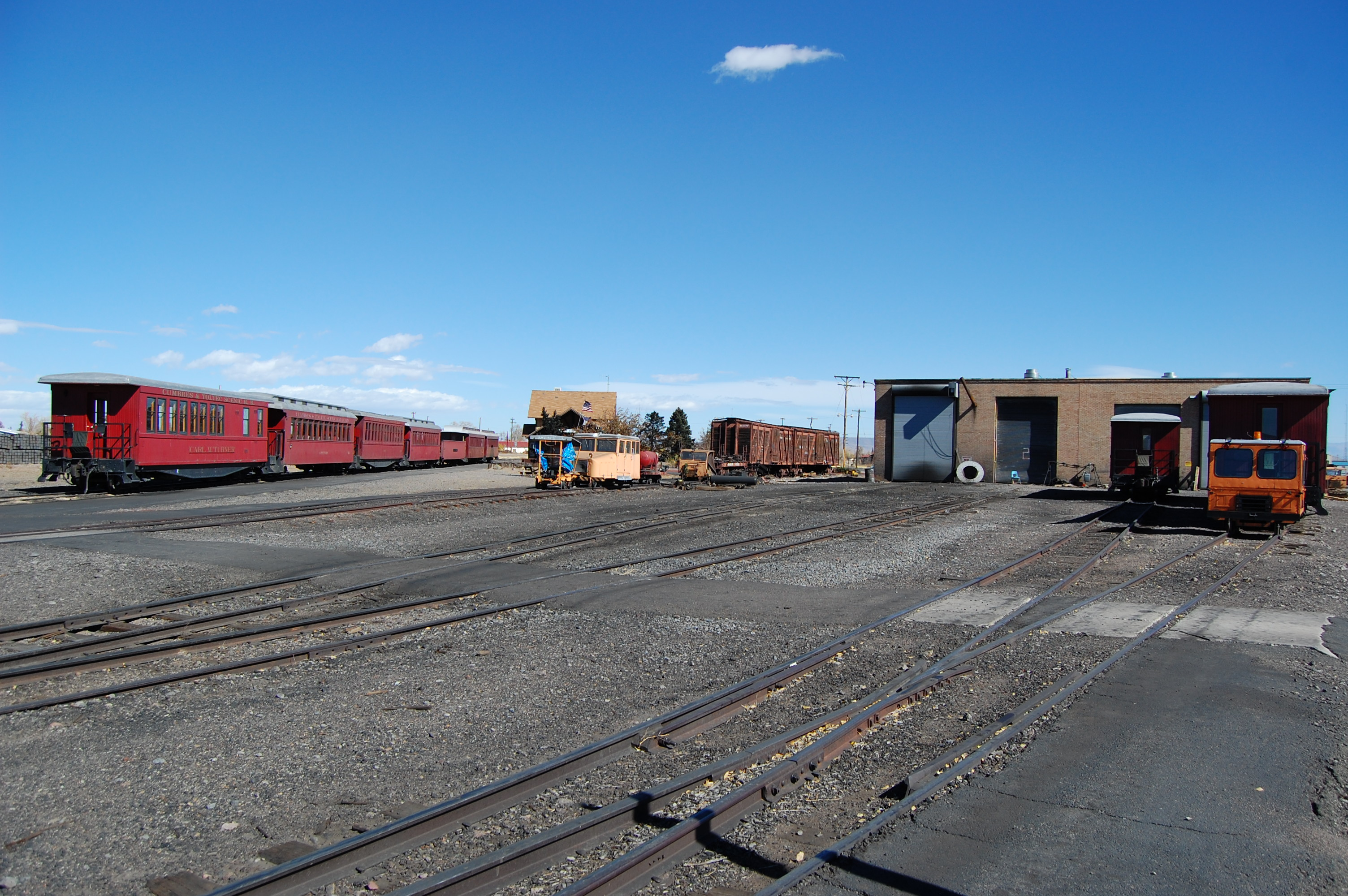
The station and shed in Antonito, October 2012

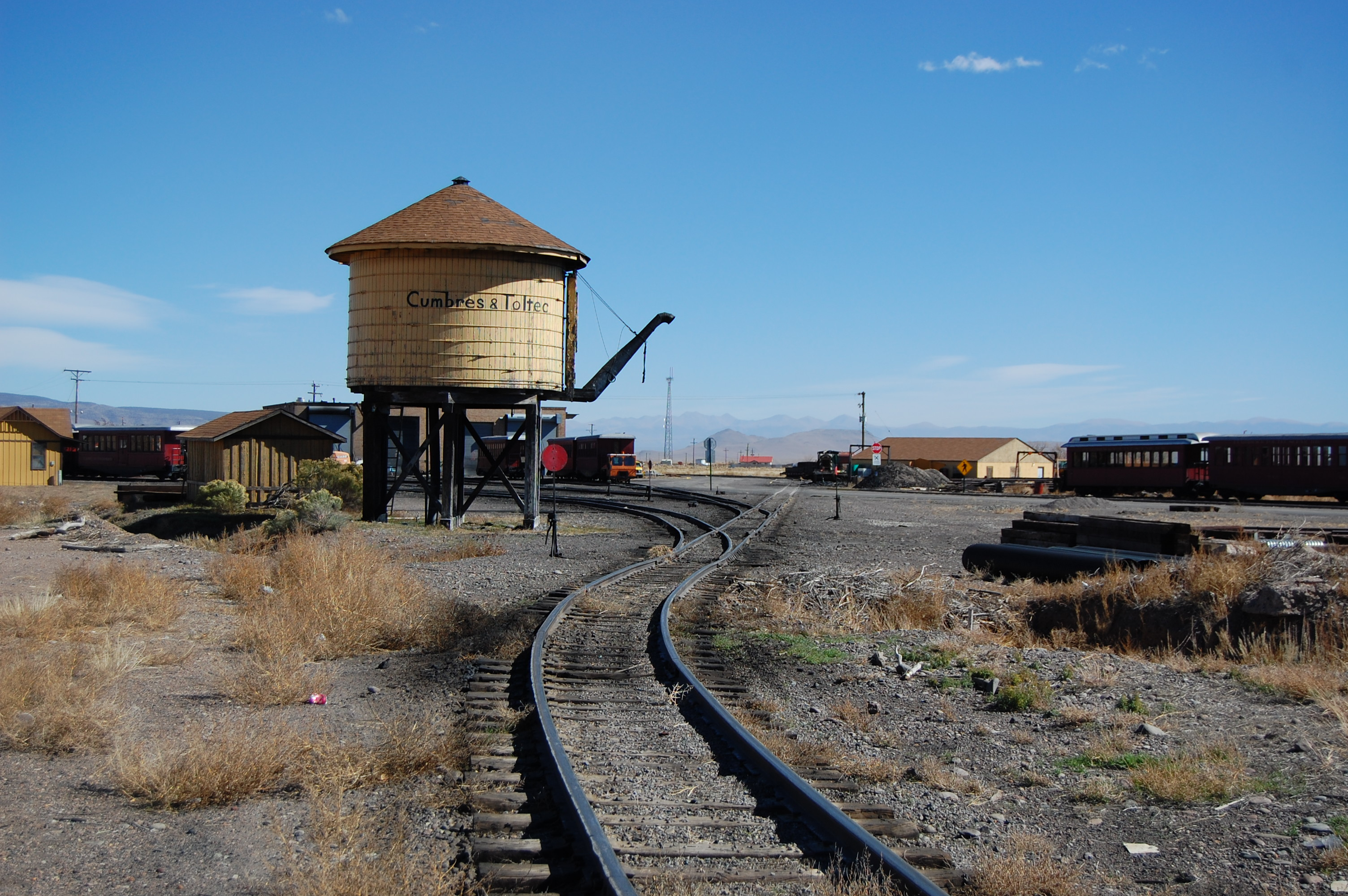
The water tower in Antonito, October 2012

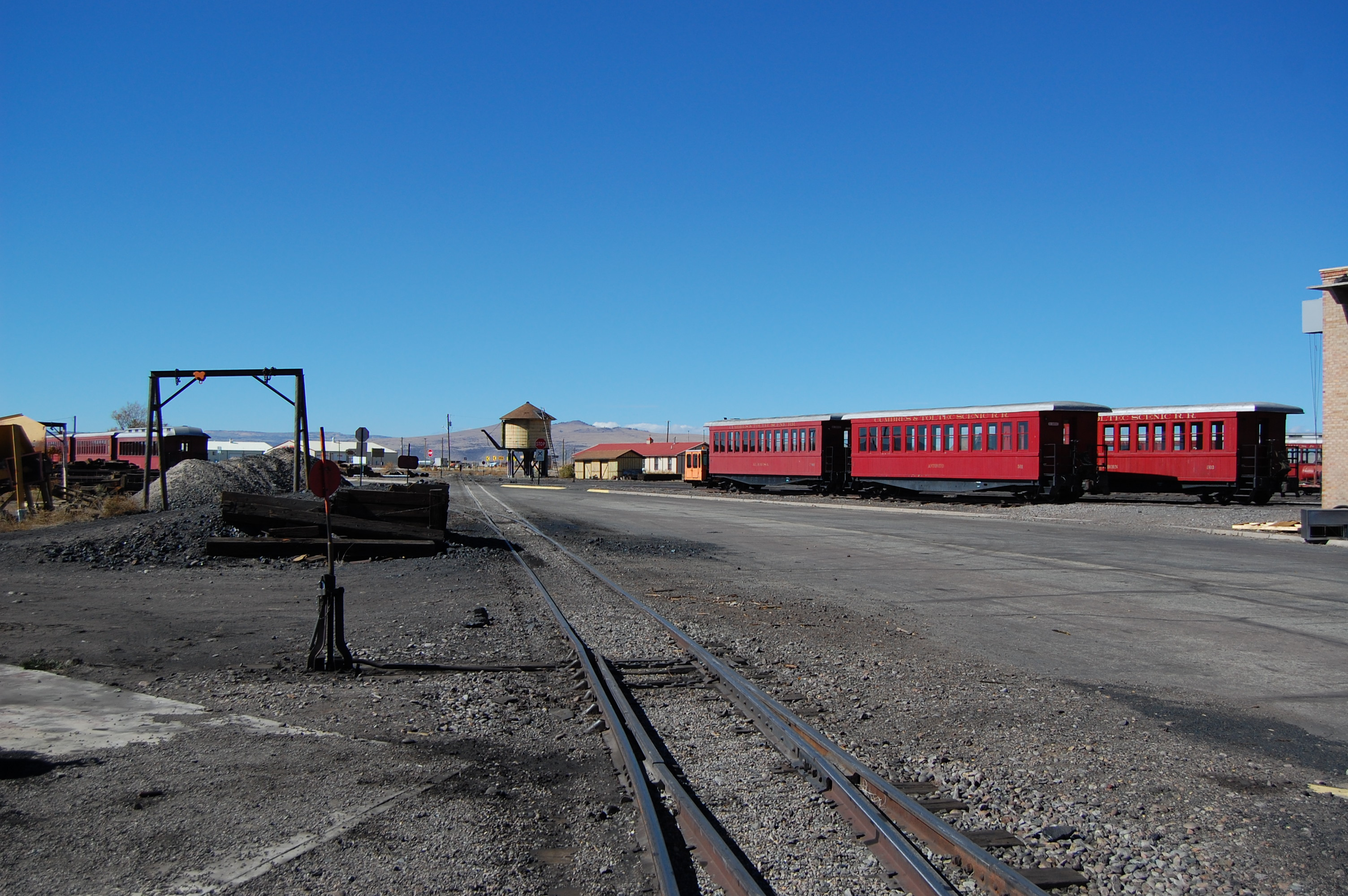
The yard in Antonito, October 2012

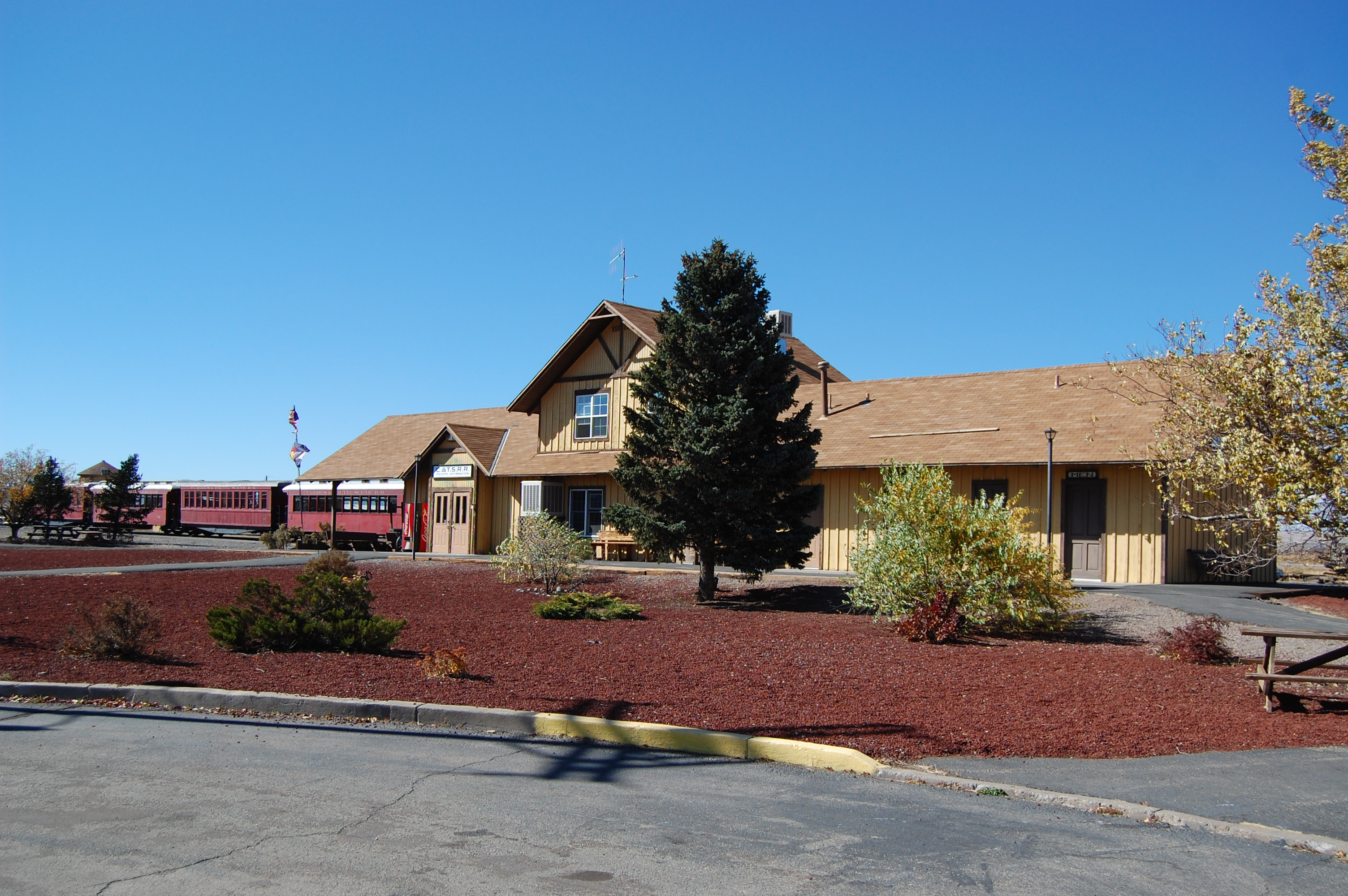
The station building in Antonito, October 2012
Line's terminus in Chama

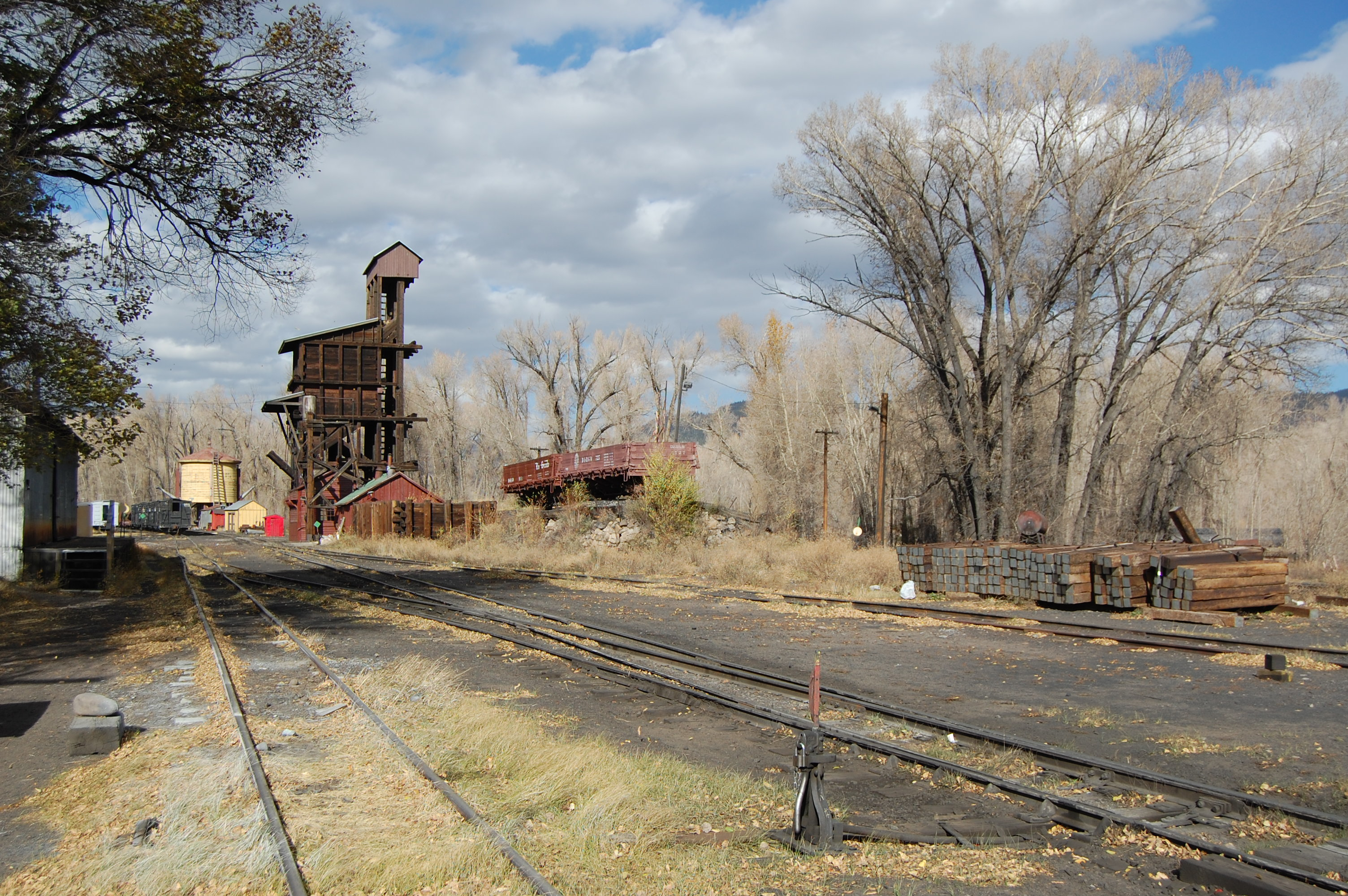
The coaling tower in Chama, October 2012

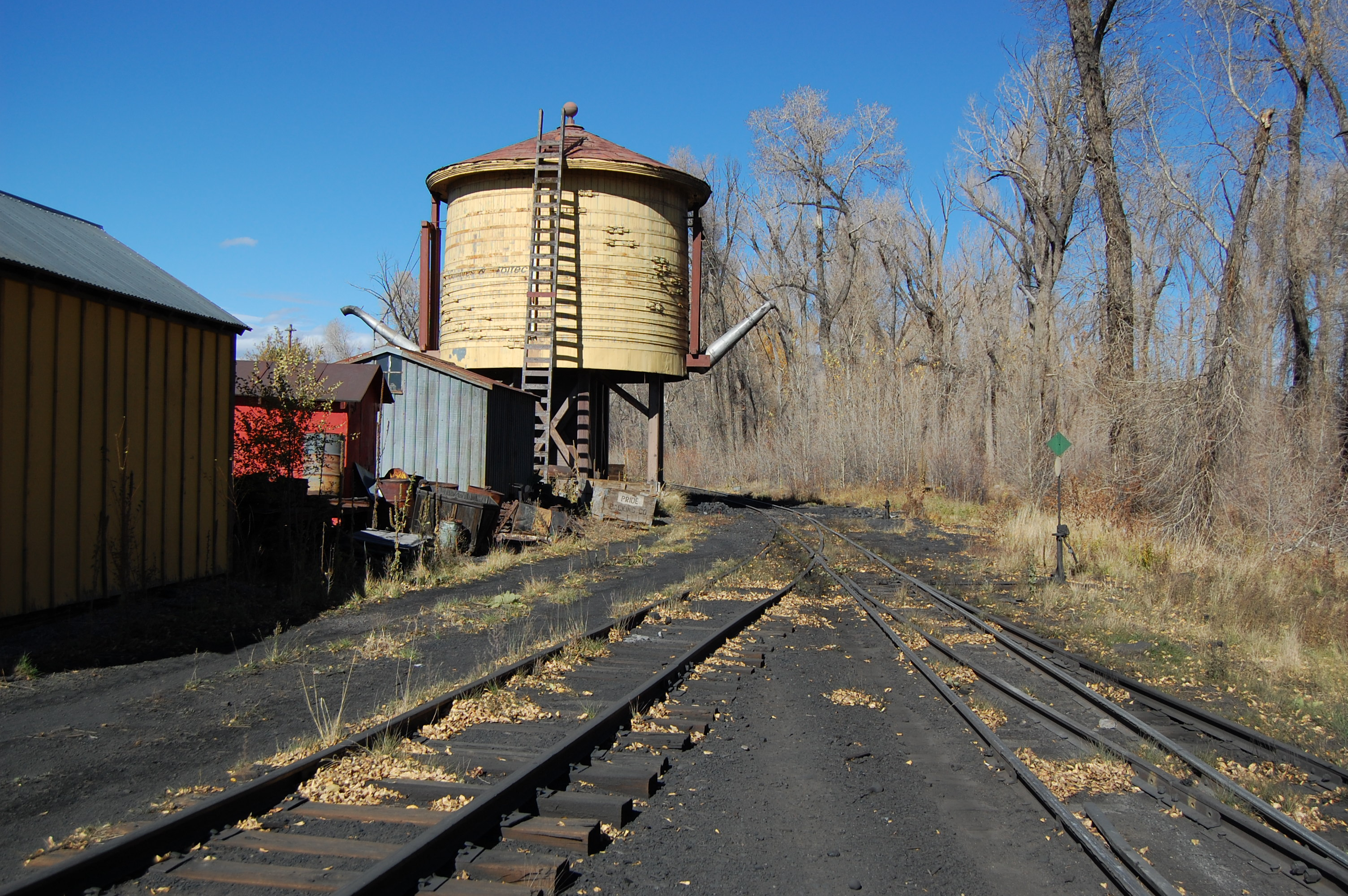
The water tower in Chama, October 2012

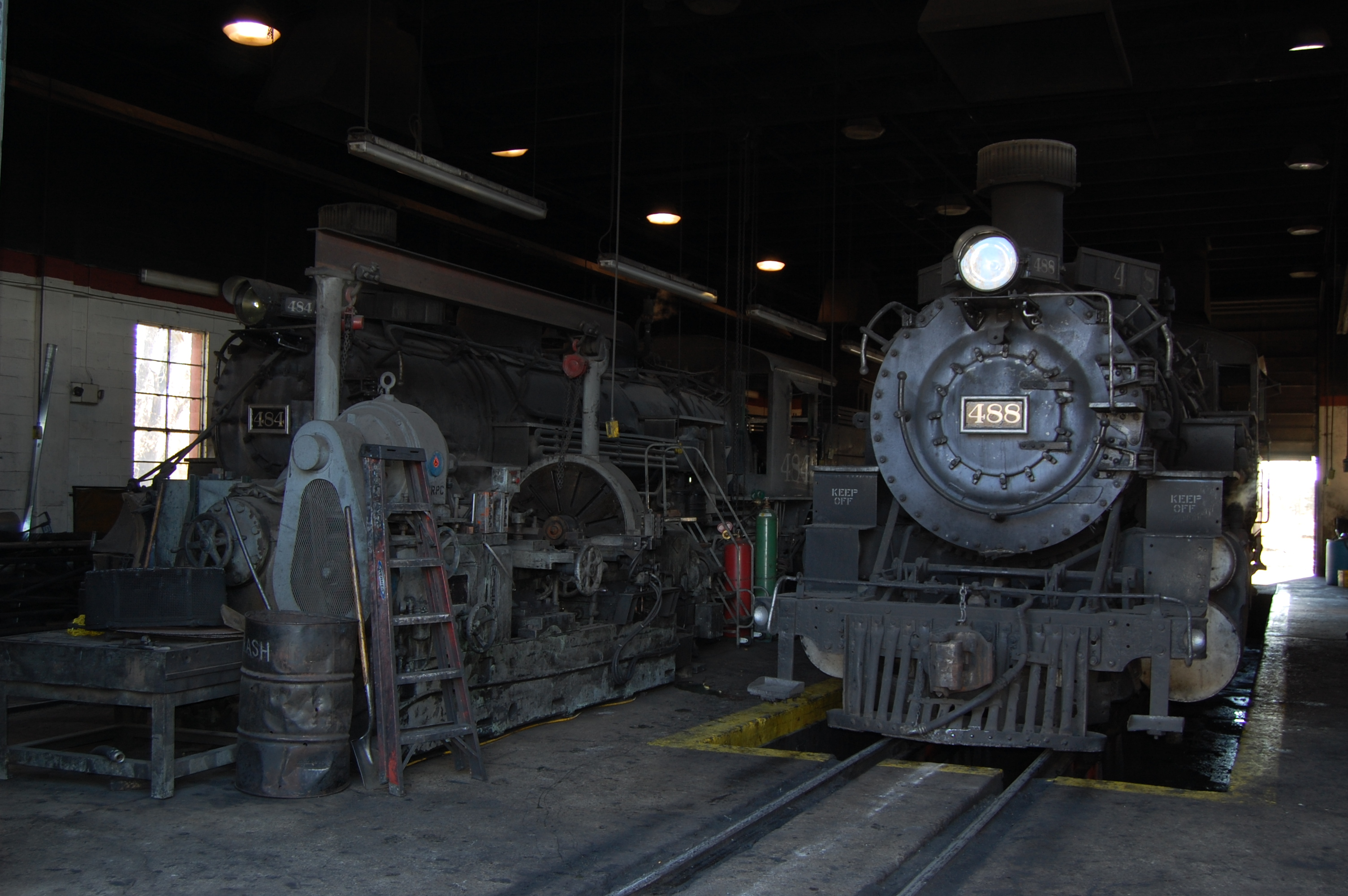
The shop in Chama, October 2012

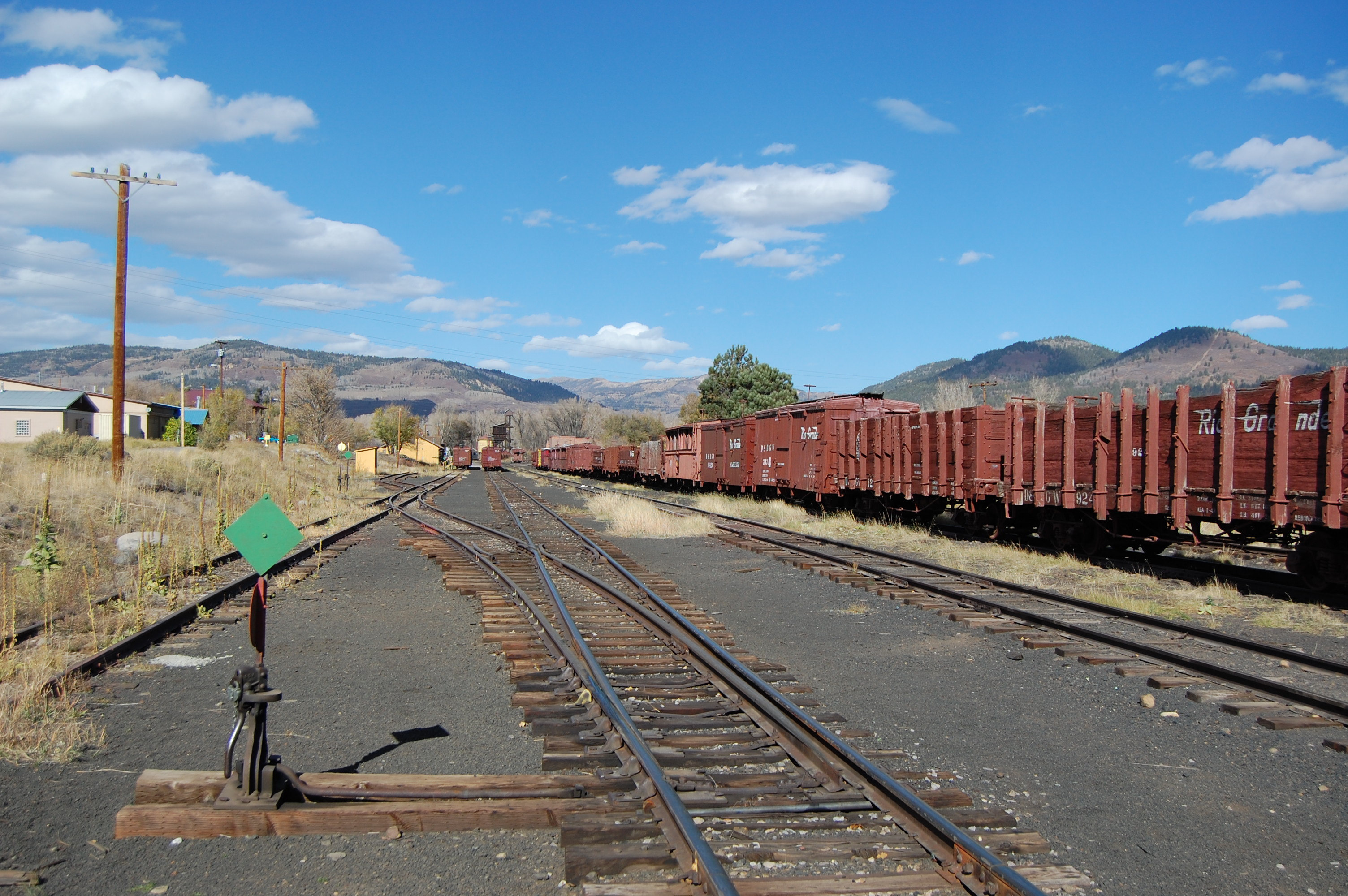
The yard in Chama, October 2012

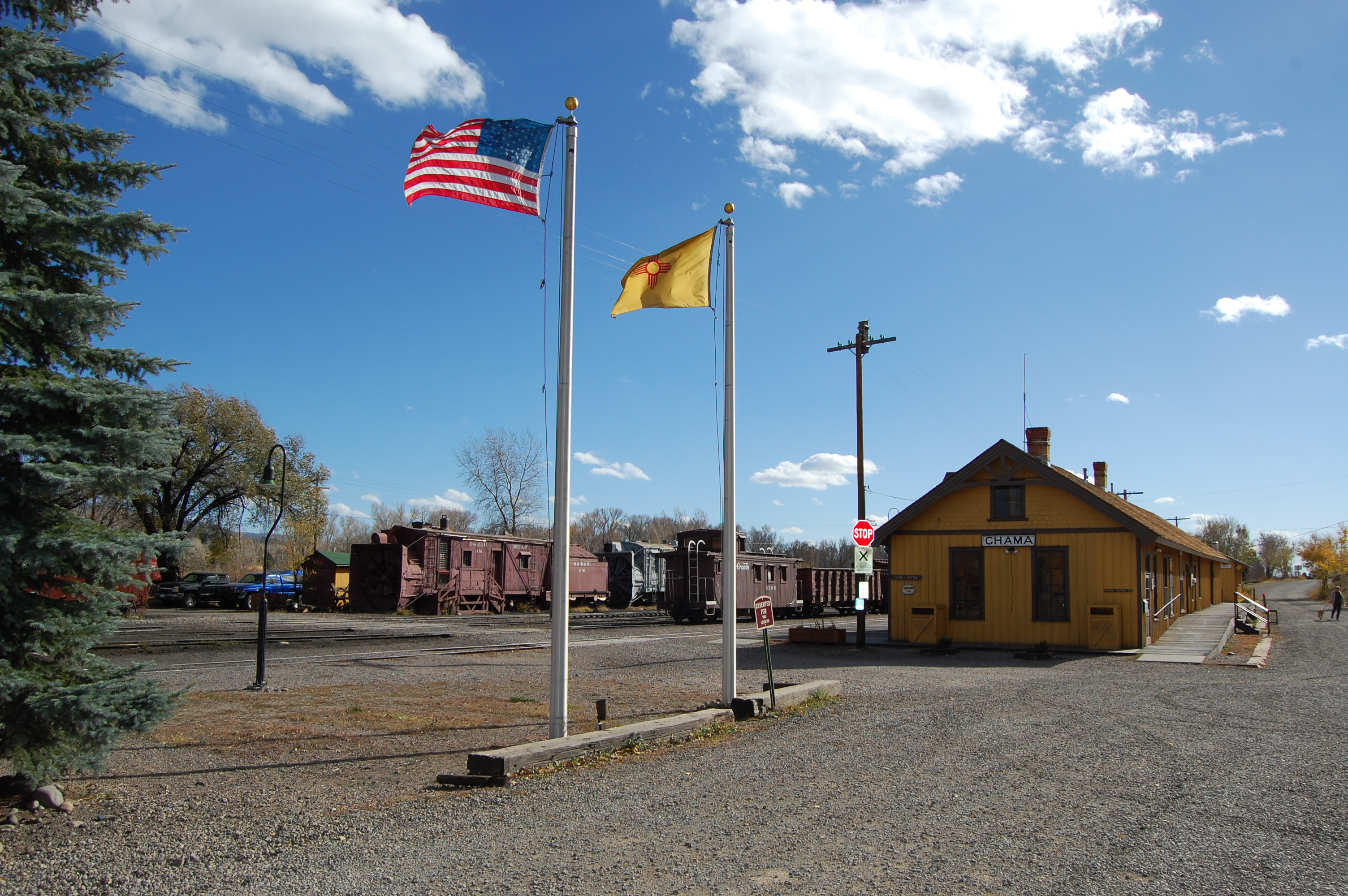
The depot in Chama, October 2012

== Rolling stock ==
Locomotive details
Number	Type	Wheel arrangement	Classification	Builder	Built	Serial number	Former	Status	In service	Anticipated return to service date
463	Steam	2-8-2	K-27	Baldwin Locomotive Works	1903	21788	Denver and Rio Grande Western Railroad	Operational	Yes	N/A
483	Steam	2-8-2	K-36	Baldwin Locomotive Works	1925	58584	Denver and Rio Grande Western Railroad	Display, undergoing cosmetic restoration	No	N/A
484	Steam	2-8-2	K-36	Baldwin Locomotive Works	1925	58585	Denver and Rio Grande Western Railroad	Operational	Yes	N/A
487	Steam	2-8-2	K-36	Baldwin Locomotive Works	1925	58588	Denver and Rio Grande Western Railroad	Operational	Yes	N/A
488	Steam	2-8-2	K-36	Baldwin Locomotive Works	1925	58589	Denver and Rio Grande Western Railroad	Operational	Yes	N/A
489	Steam	2-8-2	K-36	Baldwin Locomotive Works	1925	58590	Denver and Rio Grande Western Railroad	Operational	Yes	N/A
492	Steam	2-8-2	K-37	Baldwin Locomotive Works; Burnham Shops	1928	20749	Denver and Rio Grande Western Railroad	Under restoration	No	Unknown Date
494	Steam	2-8-2	K-37	Baldwin Locomotive Works; Burnham Shops	1928	20748	Denver and Rio Grande Western Railroad	Static display	No	N/A
495	Steam	2-8-2	K-37	Baldwin Locomotive Works; Burnham Shops	1928	20522	Denver and Rio Grande Western Railroad	Static display	No	N/A
497	Steam	2-8-2	K-37	Baldwin Locomotive Works; Burnham Shops	1930	20521	Denver and Rio Grande Western Railroad	Stored, awaiting overhaul	No	Unknown Date
15	Diesel	(B-B)	47-Ton (Center-Cab)	General Electric (GE)	1943	27538	Oahu Railway and Land Company, Georgetown Loop Railroad	Operational	Yes	N/A
19	Diesel	(B-B)	47-Ton (Center-Cab)	General Electric (GE)	1943	27539	Oahu Railway and Land Company	Operational	Yes	N/A
168*	Steam	4-6-0	T-12	Baldwin Locomotive Works	1883	6670	Denver and Rio Grande Railroad	Operational	Yes	N/A
315*	Steam	2-8-0	C-18	Baldwin Locomotive Works	1895	14352	Florence and Cripple Creek Railroad, Denver and Rio Grande Western Railroad	Operational	Yes	N/A

* No. 168 is owned by the City of Colorado Springs, Colorado. The Durango Railroad Historical Society owns No. 315. Both locomotives are stored and serviced at the C&TSRR through agreements with their respective owners and used on special excursions, hence their inclusion on this roster.

=== Locomotives ===
==== Steam locomotives ====
All of the steam locomotives operating on the C&TSRR are former Denver and Rio Grande Western Railroad locomotives. The railroad owns three classes of steam locomotives. The K-27, K-36 and K-37 engines are all outside frame 2-8-2 "Mikado" engines built by Baldwin Locomotive Works. As of 2023, of the ten steam locomotives currently owned by the C&TSRR, Nos. 463, 484, 487, 488, and 489 are all operational.

Locomotive 497, a class K-37 locomotive, was restored to operating condition for the Durango and Silverton Narrow Gauge Railroad (D&SNG) in 1984 and was traded to the C&TSRR in late October 1991 in exchange for class K-36 locomotive 482. Locomotive 497 was later taken out of service indefinitely in October 2002 and currently sits in storage in the Chama roundhouse awaiting an overhaul. On February 16, 2022, the railroad announced that K-37 locomotives 492 and 497 will be evaluated to determine which is in better condition for restoration to operating condition. After careful evaluation, locomotive 492 was chosen for restoration instead of locomotive 497. On August 9, 2023, locomotive 492 was moved from its storage track into the Chama roundhouse in preparation for restoration. Currently, the C&TSRR is restoring locomotive 492 to burn coal and will temporarily use locomotive 497's tender behind it.

In October 2019, locomotive 489, a class K-36 locomotive, went down for a Federal Railroad Administration (FRA) mandated 1,472-day inspection and replacement of the smokebox. However, the work was halted due to the COVID-19 pandemic in March 2020. The work resumed on the 1,472-day inspection and installation of the new smokebox in October 2020. On December 15, 2020, the railroad announced that it would be converting locomotive 489 to burn oil instead of coal. The decision was made "to ensure viability in diverse environmental conditions." The conversion of locomotive 489 was completed in June 2021, just in time for the opening of the 2021 operating season. On August 3, 2022, the railroad announced that parts had been ordered for a second K-36 locomotive, locomotive 487, to be converted to burn oil over the winter of 2022 to 2023.

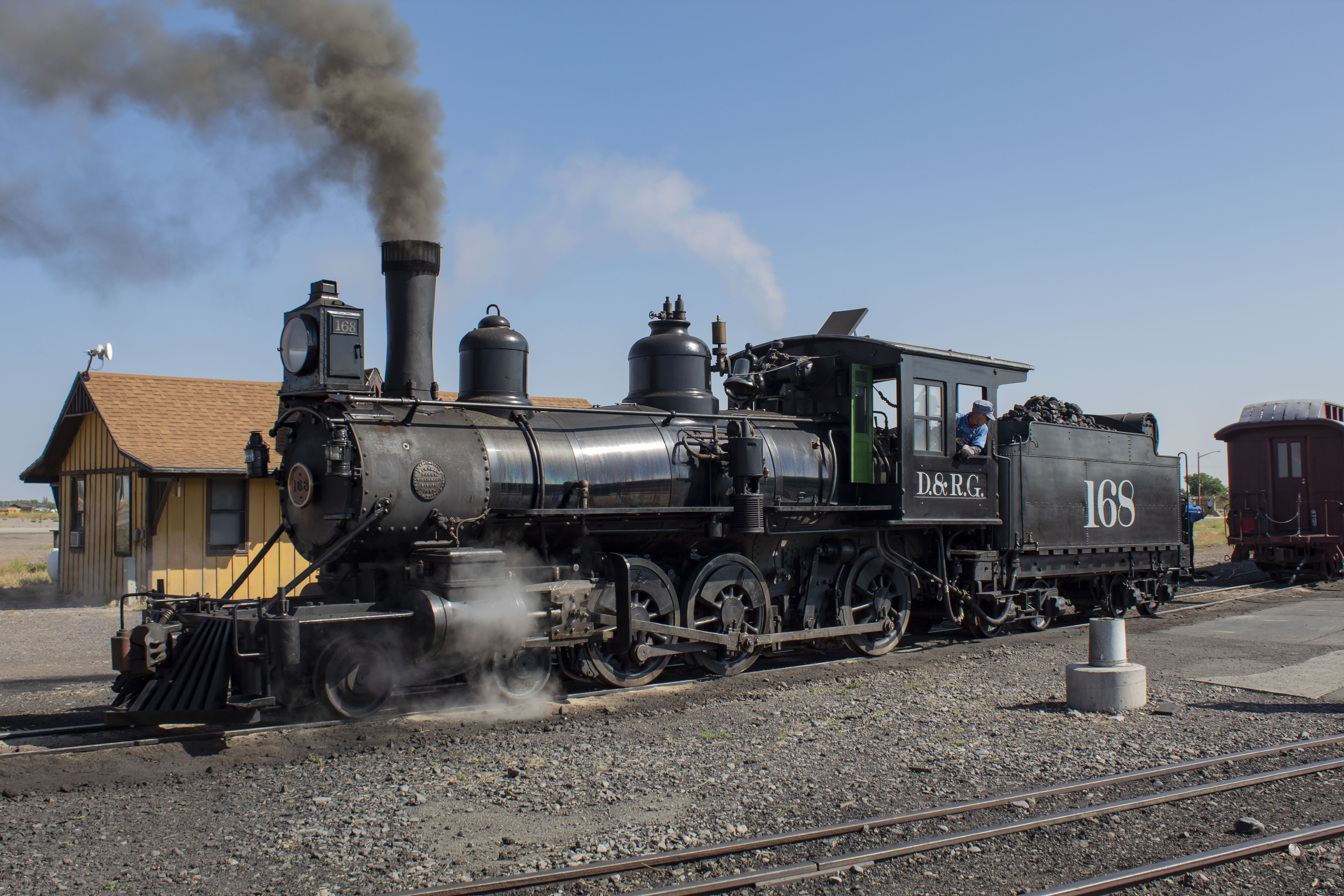
D&RG 168 after restoration as seen in 2021 at Antonito

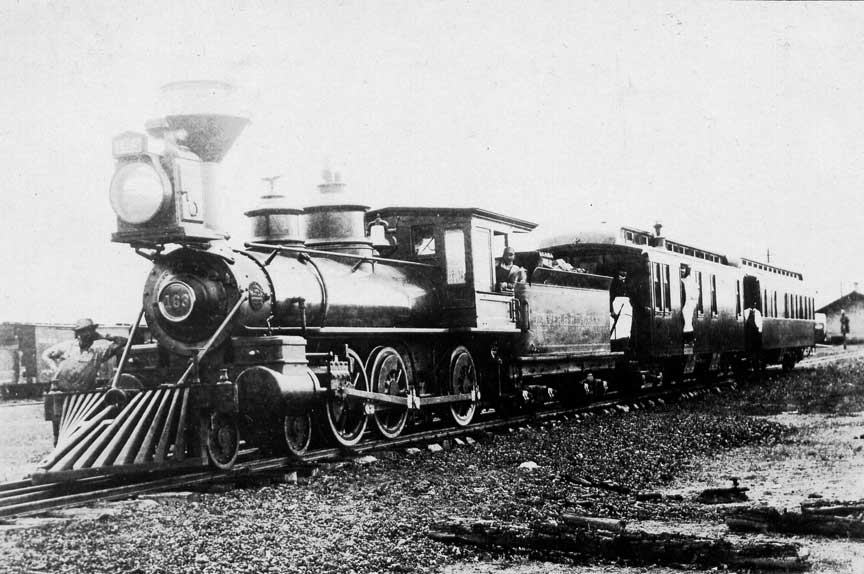
D&RG 163 (a similar engine to D&RG 168) showing what D&RG 168 looked like originally, with diamond stack, box headlight, trim on the domes, and wooden pilot (cowcatcher)

The T-12 No. 168 is a 4-6-0 "Ten Wheeler" type inside frame engine also built by Baldwin Locomotive Works. This is the oldest steam locomotive operated by the railroad. Restoration work on No. 168 was completed in October 2019, and it now operates on occasional special excursions on the C&TSRR. Another engine that operates on the railroad is D&RGW No. 315. No. 315 is a C-18 class inside frame 2-8-0 "Consolidation" type locomotive. The Durango Railroad Historical Society owns it, but it is on indefinite loan to the C&TSRR until at least 2025. Restoration work on No. 315 was completed in August 2007, and it continues to operate on occasional special excursions on both the D&SNG and the C&TSRR. After the end of the 2021 operating season in October, No. 315 was temporarily taken out of service for its federally mandated 1,472-day inspection and overhaul, but later returned to service on March 8, 2023.

==== Diesel locomotives ====
The C&TSRR owns two class DE General Electric 47-ton center-cab diesel locomotives built in 1943, Nos. 15 and 19, for emergency use when the steam locomotives are inoperative. They are also used for operations outside the normal operating season. Both came from the Oahu Railway and Land Company; No. 19 was purchased by the C&TSRR in 1972 and is currently stationed in Antonito. No. 15 was previously leased by the Georgetown Loop Railroad in the early 1990s and eventually purchased in 2013, where it is currently stationed in Chama. In November 2023, the C&TSRR acquired a Bombardier-built DL-535E from the White Pass & Yukon Route.

==== Rotary snowplows ====
The C&TSRR owns two ALCO steam-powered rotary snowplows, Rotary OY and Rotary OM. The D&RGW purchased rotary OM in the late 1800s and has served the line ever since. It has not been run since the 1970s because of mechanical issues. Rotary OY was built by ALCO in the 1920s and has served at several locations along the line. It was last run in late winter of 2020 to begin the 50th anniversary of the formation of the C&TSRR. There are currently no plans to run the rotary again anytime soon, but it is in good condition and fully functional.

==== D&RGW No. 168 ====
In 2016, D&RGW No. 168 arrived in Antonito from Colorado Springs, Colorado, for restoration to operating condition. The engine had been on display in a public park for a long time, but was in good condition. Restoration began in March 2017 and was completed in October 2019. The restoration project was headed by the Cumbres and Toltec Special Projects department, led by Assistant General Manager Efstathios Papas. The project cost $508,000 and spanned 27 months. The railroad intends to use this engine frequently in normal excursion service as much as possible. As of 2023, No. 168 continues to operate in occasional special excursions on the C&TSRR.

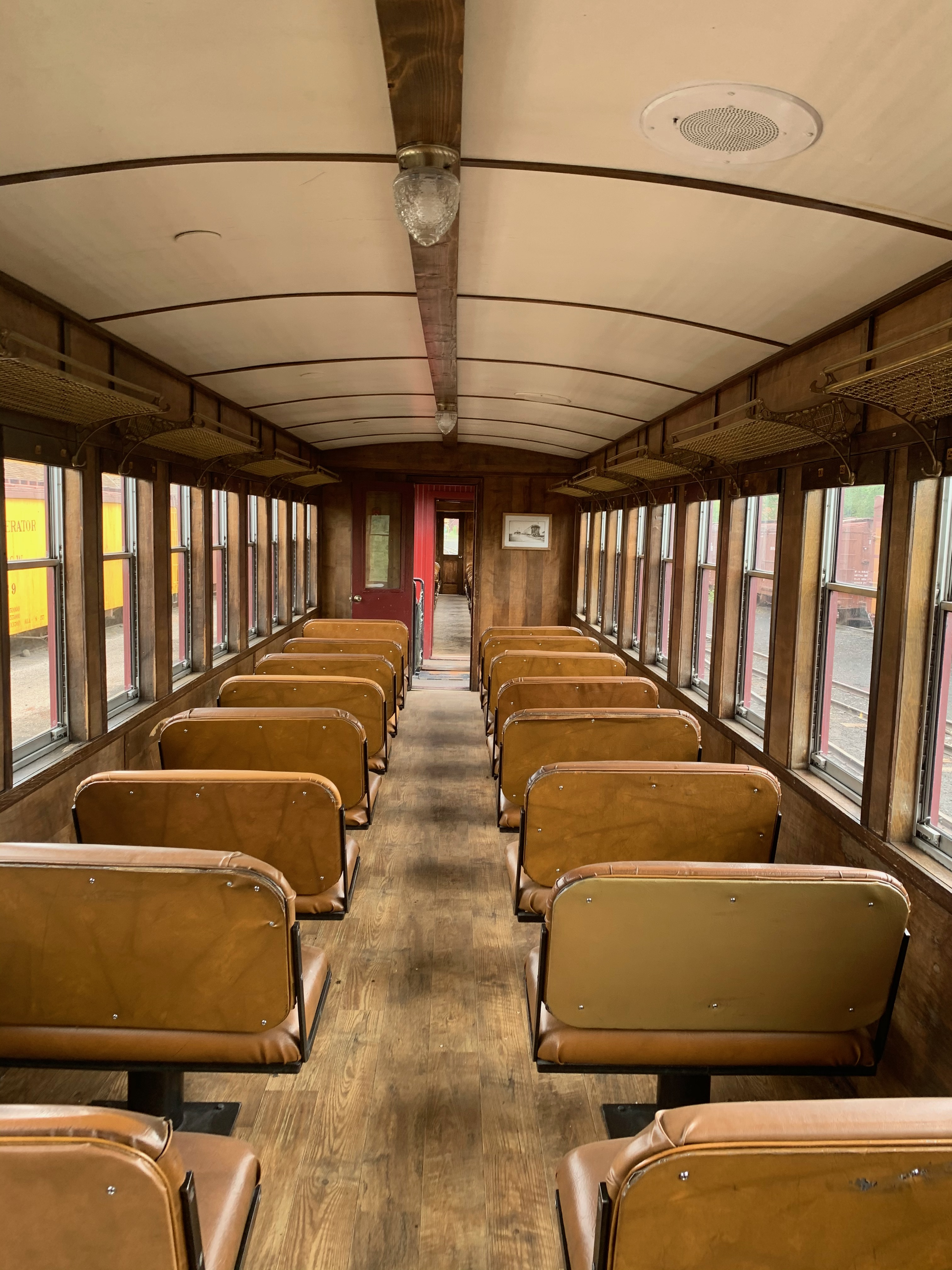
The interior of a C&TSRR passenger car No. 504

=== Passenger cars ===
For passenger services, the C&TSRR operates a mixture of flat roofed and clerestory cars, with interiors corresponding with the railroad's three classes of service: Coach, Deluxe (formerly Tourist class) and Parlor. In 2019, the car shop in Antonito, Colorado, finished the first in a line of new clerestory cars that will serve as standard passenger cars and new Parlor cars. This is part of an effort to retire the older flat-roofed cars due to their age. The C&TSRR also operates observation gondolas as well as special coaches configured to accommodate wheelchairs and house concession areas.

==== Consist ====
A typical C&TSRR train includes:

- 1 K-27 or K-36 2-8-2 steam locomotive (A second locomotive is added on most passenger trains 9 cars or longer)
- 3-4 Coaches (On some days, extra coaches are added to meet demand)
- 1 ADA/Concession coach
- 1 Observation gondola
- 1 Deluxe class coach
- 1 Parlor class coach (Only on one of the train sets)
- 1 Parlor Observation class coach

=== Freight cars ===
The Cumbres and Toltec Scenic Railroad also owns a varied collection of former D&RGW narrow-gauge freight cars for display and use in nostalgic railtours.

== In popular culture ==
Over the years, the railroad was featured in several documentaries and films. Among these are:

- The Good Guys and the Bad Guys, 1969
- Shoot Out, 1971
- Showdown, 1973
- The Fortune, 1975
- Bite the Bullet, 1975
- The Missouri Breaks, 1976
- Butch and Sundance: The Early Days, 1979
- Indiana Jones and the Last Crusade, 1989
- Ghost Trains of the Old West, 1990
- America's Historic Steam Railroads: Cumbres and Toltec Scenic Railroad, 1999
- A Million Ways to Die in the West, 2014
- Hostiles, 2017
- The Harder They Fall, 2021

== See also ==
- D & RG Narrow Gauge Trestle
- List of Colorado historic railroads
- List of Denver and Rio Grande Western Railroad lines
- List of heritage railroads in the United States
- Narrow-gauge railroads in the United States
- San Juan Express
- National Register of Historic Places listings in Colorado § Archuleta County
- National Register of Historic Places listings in Conejos County, Colorado
- National Register of Historic Places listings in Rio Arriba County, New Mexico
- List of National Historic Landmarks in Colorado
- List of National Historic Landmarks in New Mexico
