= Alamosa–Durango line =

Historic railroad line

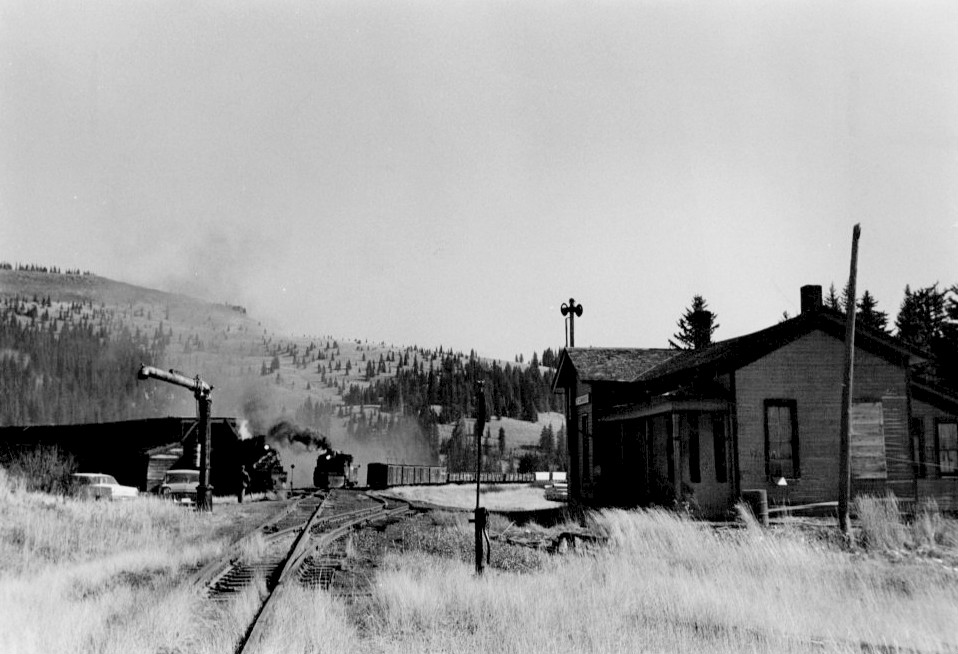
- A Denver and Rio Grande Western freight train at Cumbres Pass, CO, 1968.

Overview
- Other name(s): San Juan extension / San Juan line
- Status: Partially closed; partially extant
- Owner: Denver and Rio Grande Western Railroad (original owner); San Luis and Rio Grande Railroad (Alamosa–Antonito); Cumbres and Toltec Scenic Railroad (Antonito–Chama)
- Locale: Colorado and New Mexico, United States
- Termini: Alamosa; Durango (1881–1968) Chama (1968–present)
- Former connections: Rio Grande Southern Railroad; Rio Grande and Southwestern Railroad

Service
- Type: Mainline

History
- Opened: 1881
- Closed: 1968 (Chama-Durango)

Technical
- Line length: 200.2 mi (322.2 km)
- Track gauge: 4 ft 8 1/2 in (1,435 mm) (Alamosa–Antonito); 3 ft (914 mm) (Antonito–Chama)
- Old gauge: 3 ft (914 mm) (Alamosa–Durango)
- Highest elevation: 10,015 ft (3,053 m)
- Maximum incline: 4% (1 in 25)

The Alamosa–Durango line or San Juan extension was a railroad line built by the Denver and Rio Grande Western Railroad, following the border between the U.S. states of Colorado and New Mexico, in the Rocky Mountains. The line was originally built as a 3 ft (914 mm) narrow-gauge line between Alamosa, Colorado, and Durango, Colorado. Portions of the route survive: the now standard-gauged segment from Alamosa to Antonito, Colorado, and a narrow-gauge portion from Antonito to Chama, New Mexico.

== History ==
Following the Railroad Wars between the Denver and Rio Grande and the Atchison, Topeka and Santa Fe Railway(Santa Fe), the D&RG signed an agreement with the Santa Fe, where the Santa Fe agreed not to compete with the D&RG's plans to build an extension into the San Juan Valley. The 200 miles (320 km) rail line was built in the early 1880s to access the various mineral resources in south-western Colorado. In 1881, the line reached Durango and a short time later, a branch was built up the Animas river valley to the mining town of Silverton. In addition to the ore traffic, lumber and various agricultural commodities were also hauled along the route. The Rio Grande Southern Railroad from Durango to Ridgway was completed in 1891.

=== 20th century ===
When the D&RGW began the process of converting most of their mainlines to standard gauge in the early 1900s, the railroad had also planned to convert the San Juan extension. As a result, the section from Alamosa to Antonito was converted to dual gauge in 1901 with the addition of a standard gauge only branch from Durango south to Farmington, New Mexico a few years later. The D&RGW had also considered building a tunnel under Cumbres Pass which would have alleviated the steep 4% grade over the pass. However, with the decline in ore traffic during the early 20th century, the railroad scrapped these plans and the Farmington branch was converted to narrow-gauge in 1923. After World War II, many of the surrounding Narrow gauge lines (such as the Rio Grande Southern Railroad) closed due to lack of Traffic. However the San Juan Extension experienced an unexpected "boom" in freight traffic due to growth in the oil industry around Farmington. This increase provided the necessary revenue to keep the line operating into the 1960s.

=== Abandonment and preservation ===
By the mid-1960s, traffic had once again dwindled and in 1968, the D&RGW sought to abandon the entire route. The D&RGW never introduced mainline diesel traction on their narrow-gauge lines, as narrow-gauge locomotives would have to be custom-built at significant additional cost. Thus, the Alamosa–Durango line eventually became of the last locations in the United States where steam locomotives were still in regular use. This brought recognition that all, if not some portion, of the line should be preserved as a museum or heritage railway. In 1970, a 64-mile segment between Antonito and Chama was purchased by the states of Colorado and New Mexico, and subsequently began operating excursion trains as the Cumbres and Toltec Scenic Railroad.

Meanwhile, the rest of the route from Chama to Durango, including the Farmington branch, was abandoned and the dual-gauge Alamosa–Antonito section was converted to a traditional 2-rail standard-gauge line, becoming the last 3-rail portion of the D&RGW system to be eliminated.

=== The San Juan extension today ===
Portions of the Alamosa–Durango line survive to this day. The now standard-gauged section from Alamosa to Antonito remained under ownership by the D&RGW and its successor railroads until the line was sold to RailAmerica in 2003. Today, the line is part of the San Luis and Rio Grande Railroad, a class III railroad which also operates a seasonal excursion service.

The narrow-gauge portion between Antontio and Chama continues to operate as the Cumbres & Toltec Scenic Railroad with two trains (one in each direction) traversing the route each day during summer months.

At the ghost town of Pagosa Junction, also known as Gato, a small portion of narrow-gauge track along with a steel truss bridge are still in place.

=== Tracks Across Borders ===
Since the mid-2010s, the area along the now abandoned narrow-gauge portion between Chama and Durango has been in the process of being promoted as a scenic byway known as Tracks Across Borders. The byway, approved on April 16, 2015, follows a series of US, State, and County highways through the communities in Colorado and New Mexico that the railroad once served.

== Operations ==
During the early years, freight trains over the Alamosa–Durango line were handled by the D&RGW's fleet of 2-8-0 steam locomotives while passenger services were worked by the railroad's 4-4-0 and 4-6-0 locomotives. In later years, these were gradually superseded when more powerful 2-8-2 type engines were introduced.

=== Cumbres turn ===
Because of the 4% grade on the west side of Cumbres Pass, most eastbound freight trains performed what was known as the "Cumbres turn". After arriving at Chama, a train would be broken up and hauled in sections up to Cumbres where it was then reassembled before continuing its journey. On other portions of the route, freights were operated either by double heading or with a helper engine.

== Branch lines ==
The Alamosa–Durango line was host to several branch lines which diverted from various points along the route to connect nearby towns and industries. Among these were:

=== Silverton branch ===
Opened in 1882, the 45-mile route from Durango to Silverton was built by the D&RGW to serve the mining industries in the San Juans. Almost abandoned in the 1960s, the branch was retained by the D&RGW to serve the tourist industry and the railroad operated a seasonal passenger service during summer months. In 1981, the route was sold to Charles E. Bradshaw Jr. who then operated the branch as the Durango and Silverton Narrow Gauge Railroad. The line is currently owned by American Heritage Railways.

=== Santa Fe branch ===
The Santa Fe branch, also known as the Chili line or Española branch, ran southwards for 125 miles from Antonito to Santa Fe, New Mexico. It was built by the D&RGW during the 1880s as part of a planned rail link with El Paso, Texas. However, construction didn't go beyond Española due to a dispute with the nearby Atchison, Topeka and Santa Fe Railway. In 1887, the last 35 miles from Española to Santa Fe was opened by the Texas, Santa Fe & Northern Railroad, a subsidiary of the D&RGW. The entire route was closed in 1941 and subsequently abandoned.

=== Farmington branch ===
When completed in 1905, the 47 mile Farmington branch was unusual in that it was built as a standard gauge line, which resulted in Durango having dual gauge facilities. Much of the reason for this isolated change of gauge was that the Southern Pacific was contemplating extending to access coal fields in the northern San Juan basin, had surveyors working there, and had incorporated a subsidiary, the Arizona & Colorado Railroad Company, for this purpose. The D&RGW choice of standard gauge was in part a defensive move, and may have been enough to discourage the A&C from proceeding to construction.

The branch was converted to 3 ft gauge in 1923 after plans to standard gauge the Alamosa–Durango line fell through. After World War II, a “boom” in the oil industry around Farmington brought substantial freight traffic, which contributed to the lines viability until the early 1960’s. This branch lasted until 1968 when the D&RGW ended its narrow gauge freight operations from Alamosa to Durango.

=== Pagosa branch ===
This branch was constructed in 1900 by the Pagosa Lumber Company, as the Rio Grande, Pagosa and Northern from Pagosa Junction (Gato) to Pagosa Springs, and was conveyed to the D&RGW in 1908. At 30.7 miles, this was the shortest of the D&RGW's own major branch lines on the San Juan extension. It was also the shortest-lived; closure took place in 1936.

=== Independent Logging Railroads ===
Several short-lived railroads were built by logging companies, with varying degrees of involvement with the D&RG, to harvest timber on both sides of the main line. Typically, they would set up a sawmill at their junctions with D&RG, harvest stands of Ponderosa pine nearby and then extend spurs of six miles or so per year, as marketable timber in each area was exhausted. Portable steam-powered sawmills may have been set up along the branches, as well. In Rio Arriba County, New Mexico, by 1919 there were 175 miles of narrow-gauge logging branches and spurs.

Logging lines included:

- A D&RG line which was run 3 miles south from the E.M. Biggs sawmill at Chama in 1888, and was extended by Biggs in 1896 as the Tierra Amarilla & Southern Railway through Tierra Amarilla, New Mexico and then 10 miles further south and east. By 1902 the timber harvest was finished, and the track materials were removed for re-use at Lumberton, New Mexico:
- In 1902 The Burns-Biggs Lumber Company started to build the Rio Grande Southwestern, eventually a 40-mile line from Lumberton south to El Vado and Gallina, New Mexico with multiple branches, including 20 miles south as far as Llaves. By 1928 the timber had been exhausted, and the line removed.
- Biggs was also logging north from Lumberton. In 1895 his Rio Grande & Pagosa Springs was extended 38 miles toward that community, though did not reach it; branches instead reached Chromo and Blanca, Colorado. This line began to wither by 1911, and closed in 1914.
- Another Biggs line from Lumberton went north to Edith, Colorado, eventually extending to Flaugh, Colorado by the following year.
- The Pagosa Lumber Company built a sawmill at Dulce, New Mexico, with trackage from about 1914 running southwest as far as Mills Lake; and which closed around 1930.
