= Osier, Colorado =

Populated place in Colorado, United States

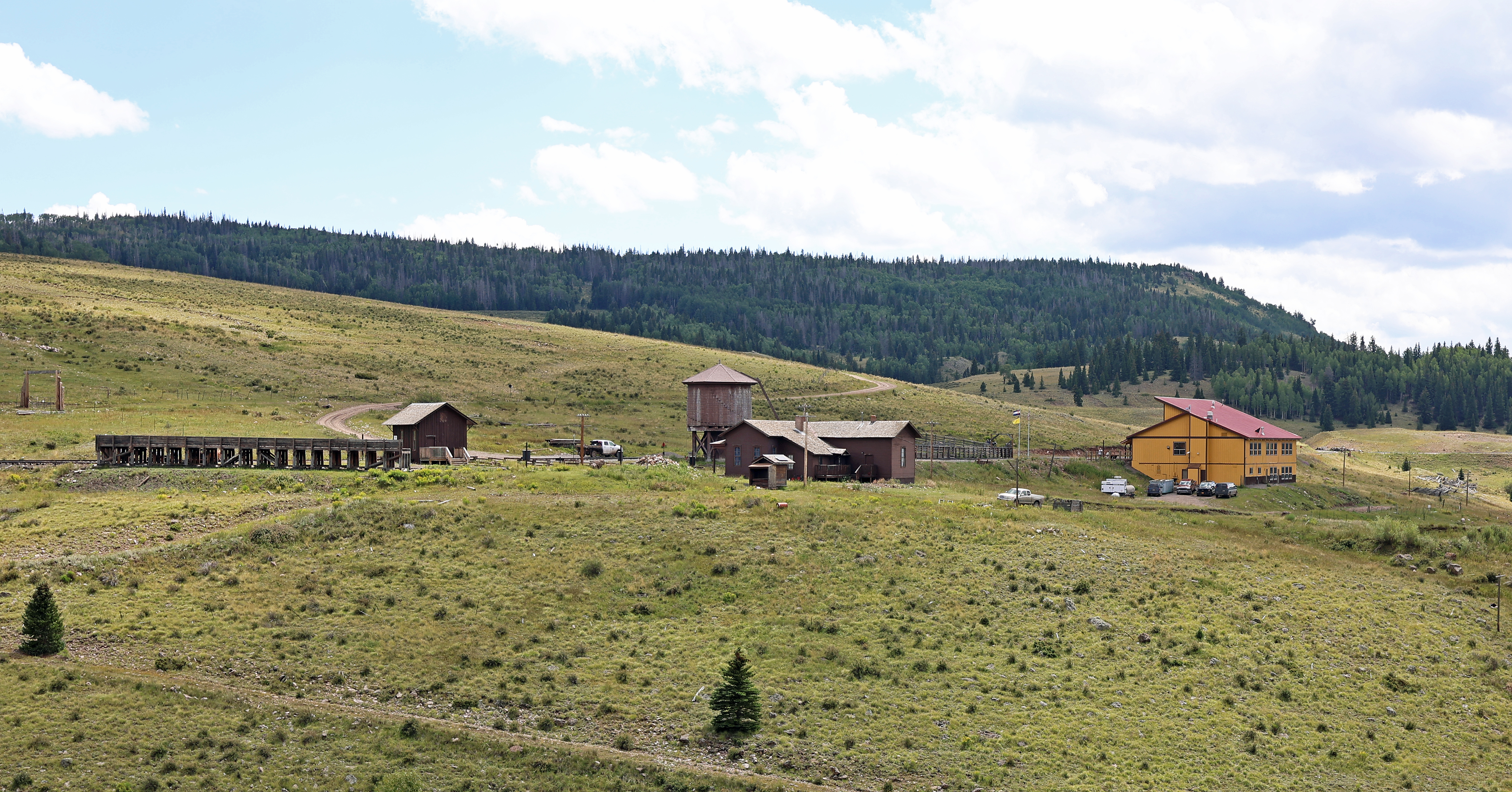
Osier in 2024

Osier is a ghost town in Conejos County, Colorado, U.S. Although the U.S. Geographic Names Information System classifies it as a populated place, it is really a ghost town, as no one lives there any longer. It is an old railroad settlement and train stop approximately halfway along the Cumbres and Toltec Scenic Railroad where trains from both ends of the line meet and stop for lunch, making it possible for passengers to either continue in the same direction or return to their point of origin afterwards.

This location by the Rio de los Pinos river was the halfway point on the old toll road from Conejos, Colorado, to Chama, New Mexico, and can be reached by Forest Road 103 from State Highway 17. Osier's elevation is 9,260 feet (2,820 meters).

== History ==
In 1878, the valley where Osier lies was the location of the toll gate for the Park View and Ft. Garland toll road. In 1880, the Denver and Rio Grande Railroad created Osier in the course of building the narrow gauge San Juan Extension from Alamosa, Colorado, to Durango, Colorado.

The Rio Grande built several other structures at Osier including a section house, station, water tank and bunk house. More recently, the Rio Grande's successor, the Cumbres and Toltec Scenic Railroad, built a kitchen and dining facility where passengers are served a hot lunch every day the trains are running (which is only during the summer season).

Osier was where six snowmobile riders sought refuge after becoming lost in the Colorado backcountry in early January 2008. A snowstorm and threat of avalanche delayed rescuers, and the two families in the group broke into the kitchen where they found popcorn, chicken bouillon and gravy mix, keeping them alive until help could arrive.

== Location ==
- Osier Station 37°0′44″N 106°20′9″W

== Nearby locations along the Cumbres & Toltec ==
- Cumbres Pass 37°01′10.4″N 106°26′53.4″W
- Toltec Gorge 36°59′3.9″N 106°18′22.2″W
- Sublette Station 36°59′20″N 106°13′48″W

== See also ==
- Cumbres and Toltec Scenic Railroad
