= Chama, New Mexico =

- Village
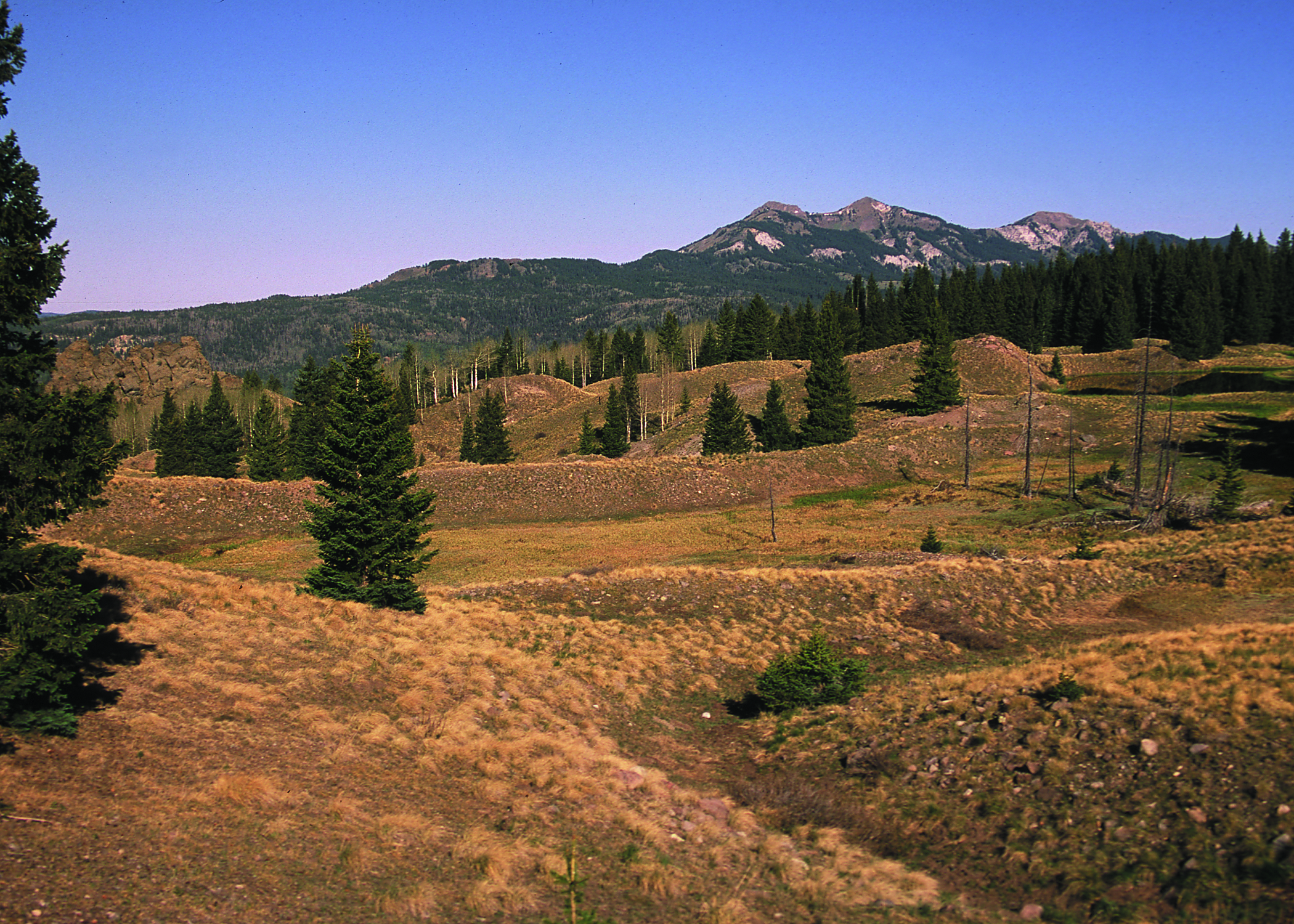
- A ranch near Chama

- Location of Chama in New Mexico

- Location of New Mexico in the United States
- Coordinates: 36°52′51″N 106°35′04″W
- Country: United States
- State: New Mexico
- County: Rio Arriba

Area
  - Total: 2.91 sq mi (7.54 km^{2})
  - Land: 2.88 sq mi (7.46 km^{2})
  - Water: 0.031 sq mi (0.08 km^{2})
- Elevation: 7,825 ft (2,385 m)

Population (2020)
  - Total: 917
  - Density: 318.3/sq mi (122.91/km^{2})
- Time zone: UTC-7 (Mountain (MST))
  - Summer (DST): UTC-6 (MDT)
- ZIP Code: 87520
- Area code: 575
- FIPS code: 35-13970
- GNIS feature ID: 2413539
- Website: www.villageofchama.com

Chama is a village in Rio Arriba County, New Mexico, United States. The population was 917 at the 2020 census. The village is located in the Rocky Mountains about 7 miles (11 km) south of the Colorado-New Mexico border.

== Geography ==
Chama is located on the Rio Chama, 6.5 miles (10 km) south of the Colorado border. According to the United States Census Bureau, the village has a total area of 2.6 square miles (6.7 km^{2}), all of it land.

== History ==
Chama was originally part of the Tierra Amarilla Land Grant. In 1880 the Denver & Rio Grande Railroad began construction of its San Juan Extension from Antonito, Colorado westward toward a mining district in the northern San Juan Basin of Colorado. The railroad needed an engine terminal for helper locomotives, near to the western foot of the steep gradient toward Cumbres Pass. It chose a site on the western bank of the Rio Chama where the railroad crossed it, for the terminal and its supporting townsite, naming the village for the river crossing. Train service began on February 1, 1881 and a post office was established that year.

The northern valley of the Rio Chama had extensive coniferous forest, with dense stands of Ponderosa pine. Timber harvesting and sawmilling rapidly developed from the early 1880's, and was a major industry into the 1930's.

Chama is now the western terminus of the Cumbres and Toltec Scenic Railroad, a steam-driven, narrow gauge heritage railway which carries visitors to and from Osier, Colorado, and Antonito, Colorado, during the summer months. This is the remaining 64 mile portion of the Denver & Rio Grande's San Juan Extension between Alamosa, and Durango, Colorado. The tracks from Chama westward to Durango were abandoned in September 1967 and torn up soon afterwards.

== Demographics ==
Historical population
Census	Pop.	Note	%±
1970	899		—
1980	1,090		21.2%
1990	1,048		−3.9%
2000	1,199		14.4%
2010	1,022		−14.8%
2020	917		−10.3%
U.S. Decennial Census

At the 2000 census, there were 1,199 people, 467 households and 312 families residing in the village. The population density was 467.9 inhabitants per square mile (180.7/km^{2}). There were 601 housing units at an average density of 234.5 per square mile (90.5/km^{2}). The racial makeup of the village was 67.56% White, 1.58% African American, 2.67% Native American, 0.08% Asian, 25.10% from other races, and 3.00% from two or more races. Hispanic or Latino of any race were 71.23% of the population.

There were 467 households, of which 30.8% had children under the age of 18 living with them, 49.5% were married couples living together, 12.0% had a female householder with no husband present, and 33.0% were non-families. 26.3% of all households were made up of individuals, and 8.8% had someone living alone who was 65 years of age or older. The average household size was 2.57 and the average family size was 3.13.

26.6% of the population were under the age of 18, 6.7% from 18 to 24, 26.3% from 25 to 44, 28.2% from 45 to 64, and 12.3% who were 65 years of age or older. The median age was 38 years. For every 100 females, there were 95.9 males. For every 100 females age 18 and over, there were 90.1 males.

The median household income was $30,513, and the median family income was $31,983. Males had a median income of $27,167 compared with $20,054 for females. The per capita income for the village was $16,670. About 11.9% of families and 17.9% of the population were below the poverty line, including 28.6% of those under age 18 and 13.7% of those age 65 or over.

== Education ==
It is within the Chama Valley Independent Schools school district. Chama has a K-8 school, Chama Middle/Elementary School, while Chama's 9-12 students would by default attend the district's only high school, a part of Escalante Middle/High School.

== Climate ==
This climatic region is typified by large seasonal temperature differences, with short, cool-to-warm summers and long, cold (sometimes severely cold) winters. According to the Köppen Climate Classification system, Chama has a warm-summer humid continental climate, abbreviated "Dfb" on climate maps.

Climate data for Chama, New Mexico (1991–2020 normals, extremes 1893–present)
Month	Jan	Feb	Mar	Apr	May	Jun	Jul	Aug	Sep	Oct	Nov	Dec	Year
Record high °F (°C)	69 (21)	65 (18)	78 (26)	79 (26)	89 (32)	98 (37)	99 (37)	99 (37)	94 (34)	84 (29)	79 (26)	68 (20)	99 (37)
Mean maximum °F (°C)	50.3 (10.2)	52.7 (11.5)	62.3 (16.8)	69.6 (20.9)	77.6 (25.3)	86.6 (30.3)	88.5 (31.4)	85.8 (29.9)	81.7 (27.6)	73.8 (23.2)	62.4 (16.9)	52.7 (11.5)	89.5 (31.9)
Mean daily maximum °F (°C)	37.5 (3.1)	40.8 (4.9)	48.4 (9.1)	56.2 (13.4)	65.5 (18.6)	76.8 (24.9)	80.4 (26.9)	77.8 (25.4)	71.5 (21.9)	60.6 (15.9)	47.7 (8.7)	37.7 (3.2)	58.4 (14.7)
Daily mean °F (°C)	22.3 (−5.4)	25.8 (−3.4)	33.4 (0.8)	40.2 (4.6)	48.5 (9.2)	57.6 (14.2)	63.2 (17.3)	61.7 (16.5)	54.7 (12.6)	43.9 (6.6)	32.3 (0.2)	22.9 (−5.1)	42.2 (5.7)
Mean daily minimum °F (°C)	7.1 (−13.8)	10.8 (−11.8)	18.3 (−7.6)	24.2 (−4.3)	31.5 (−0.3)	38.5 (3.6)	46.0 (7.8)	45.6 (7.6)	37.9 (3.3)	27.1 (−2.7)	16.9 (−8.4)	8.2 (−13.2)	26.0 (−3.3)
Mean minimum °F (°C)	−11.1 (−23.9)	−8.2 (−22.3)	−0.2 (−17.9)	10.0 (−12.2)	20.1 (−6.6)	27.7 (−2.4)	37.0 (2.8)	37.7 (3.2)	25.4 (−3.7)	12.3 (−10.9)	−1.6 (−18.7)	−10.7 (−23.7)	−15.2 (−26.2)
Record low °F (°C)	−30 (−34)	−30 (−34)	−19 (−28)	−8 (−22)	7 (−14)	18 (−8)	28 (−2)	15 (−9)	13 (−11)	−2 (−19)	−23 (−31)	−30 (−34)	−30 (−34)
Average precipitation inches (mm)	2.04 (52)	1.94 (49)	1.45 (37)	1.51 (38)	1.59 (40)	0.80 (20)	2.32 (59)	3.02 (77)	2.32 (59)	1.73 (44)	1.69 (43)	1.94 (49)	22.35 (568)
Average snowfall inches (cm)	22.6 (57)	23.0 (58)	13.9 (35)	5.9 (15)	1.1 (2.8)	0.0 (0.0)	0.0 (0.0)	0.0 (0.0)	0.0 (0.0)	2.1 (5.3)	9.7 (25)	13.6 (35)	91.9 (233)
Average extreme snow depth inches (cm)	22.9 (58)	26.3 (67)	20.7 (53)	5.0 (13)	0.3 (0.76)	0.0 (0.0)	0.0 (0.0)	0.0 (0.0)	0.0 (0.0)	1.6 (4.1)	6.7 (17)	13.9 (35)	28.5 (72)
Average precipitation days (≥ 0.01 inch)	7.2	8.4	6.7	7.1	7.6	4.8	12.3	12.9	9.0	7.0	5.5	7.9	96.4
Average snowy days (≥ 0.1 in)	6.7	7.4	4.3	2.5	0.5	0.0	0.0	0.0	0.0	0.7	3.5	6.3	31.9
Source: NOAA

== Popular culture ==
Chama has been featured in several films, including The Good Guys and the Bad Guys (1969) The Cowboys (1972), Bite the Bullett (1975), The Ballad of Gregorio Cortez (1982), Butch and Sundance: The Early Days (1989), Indiana Jones and the Last Crusade (1989), Wyatt Earp (1994), Wild Wild West (1999), All the Pretty Horses, (2000), Appaloosa (2008), A Million Ways to Die in the West (2014), Godless (2016), and Hostiles (2017).

An episode of Anthony Bourdain: No Reservations was filmed around the Rio Chama. A 2014 episode of the Discovery Channel miniseries Klondike was also filmed around Chama.

== Gallery ==
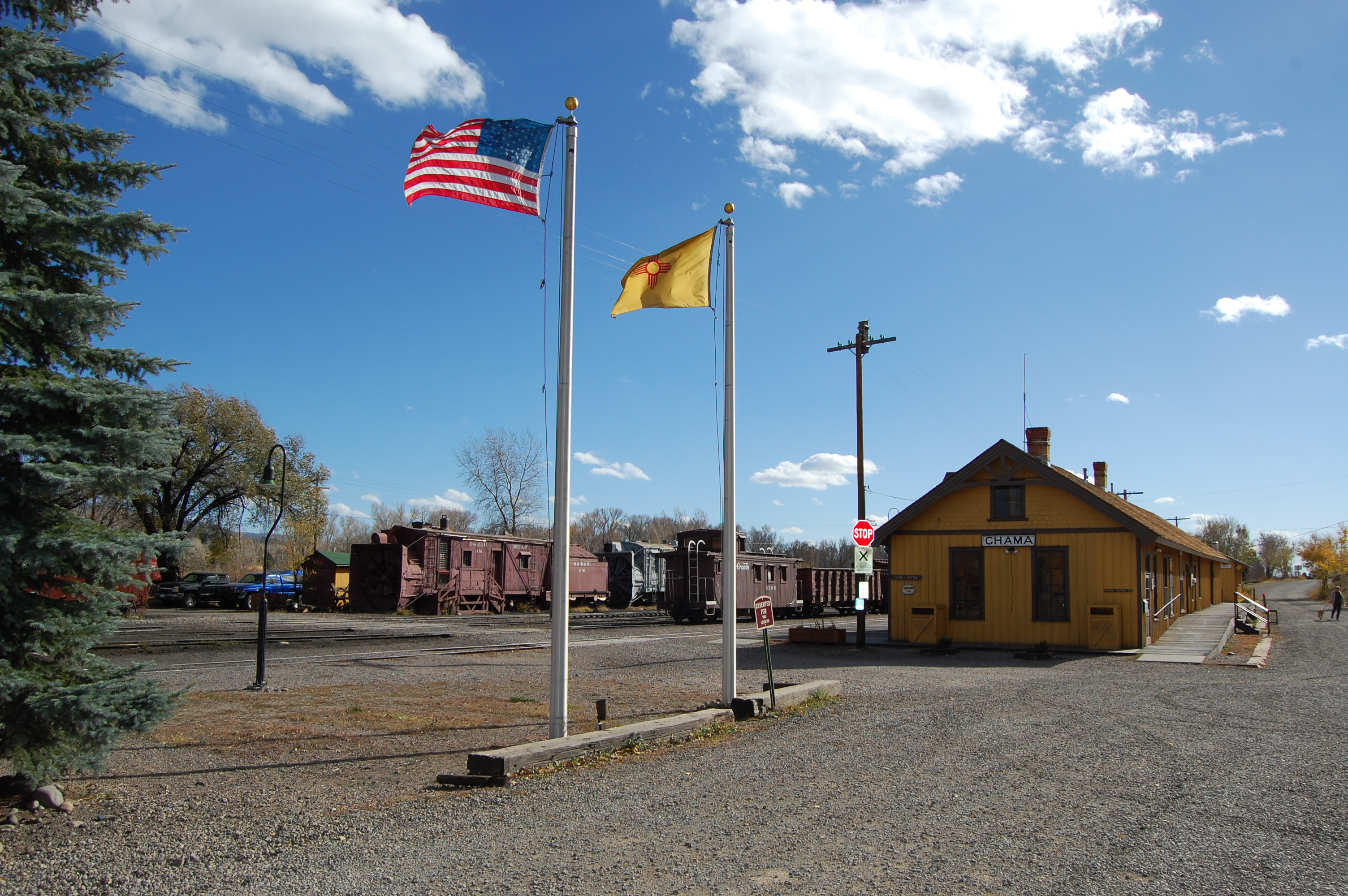
The Chama train depot

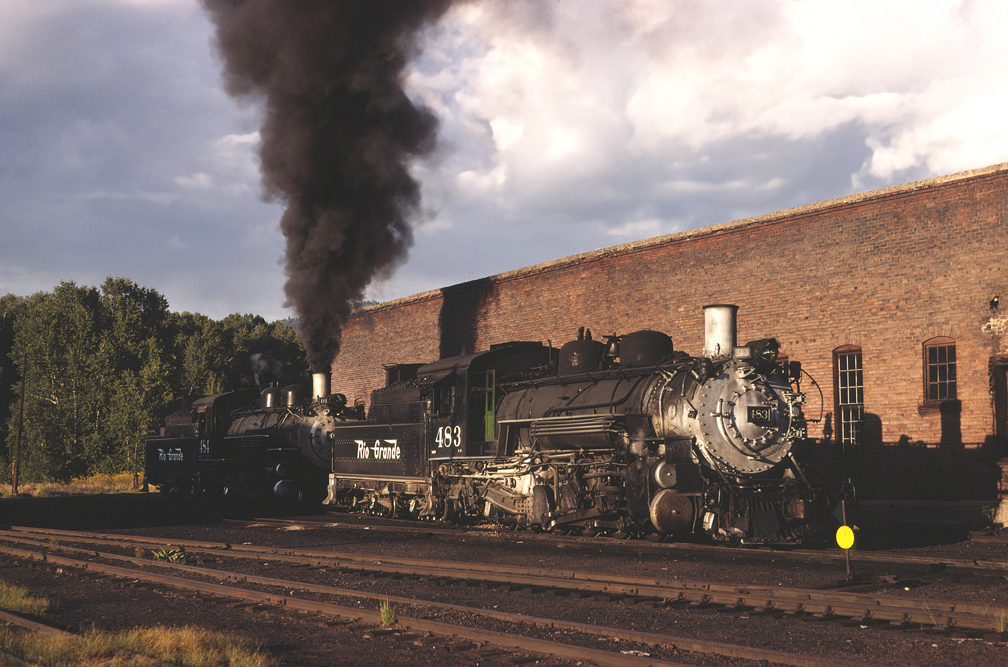
Two DRGW locomotives waiting to be serviced at the Chama engine house, 1967.

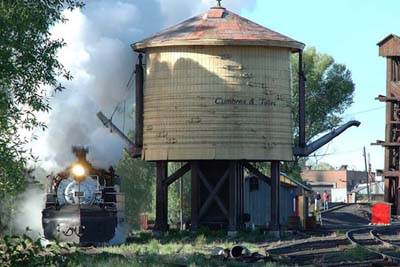
Cumbres & Toltec train in downtown Chama.
