= Antonito, Colorado =

Statutory town in Conejos County, Colorado, United States

- statutory town
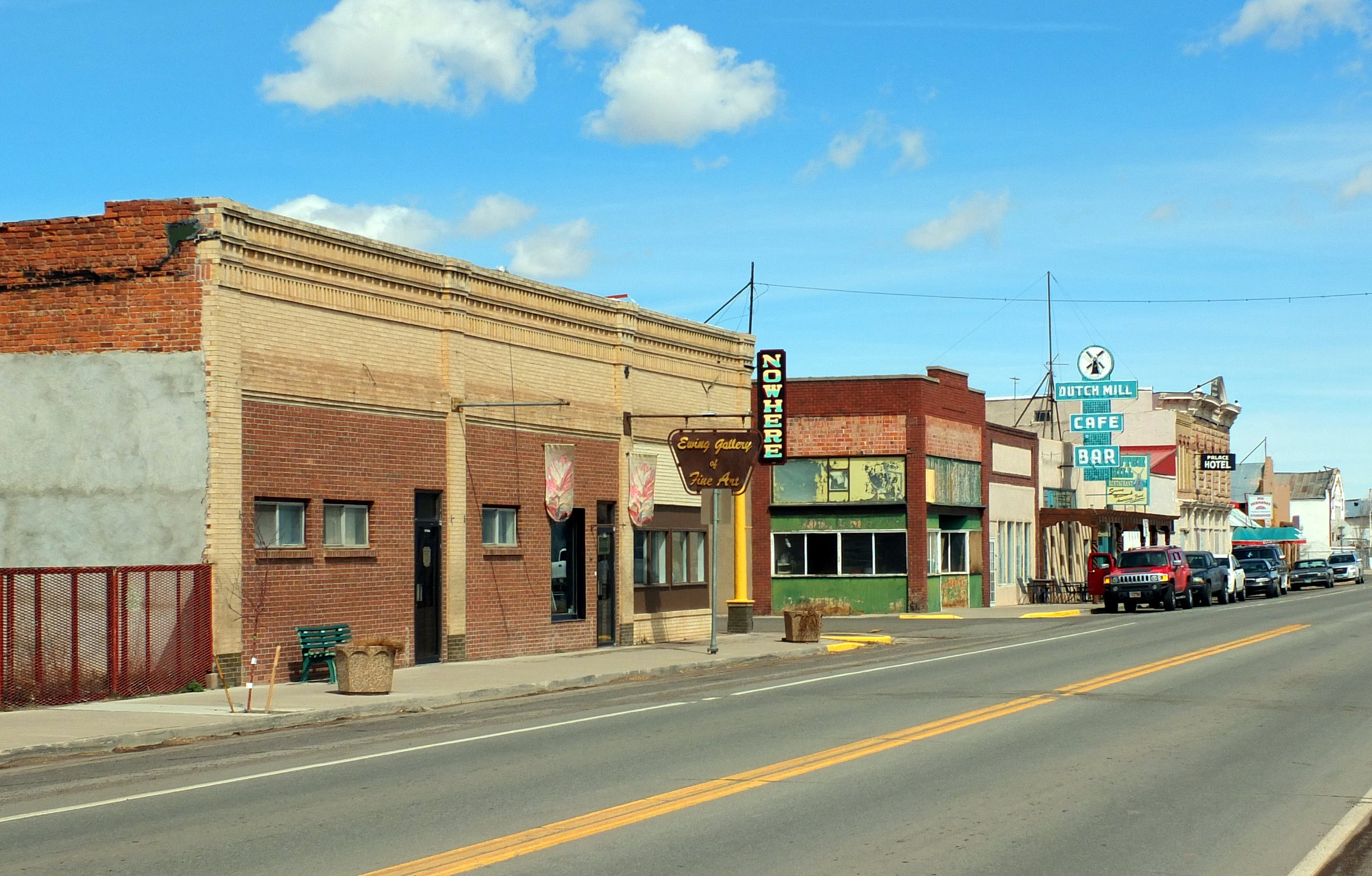
- Antonito (2014)

- Location of the Town of Antonito in Conejos County, Colorado.

- Location of the Town of Antonito, Colorado. Antonito (Colorado)
- Coordinates: 37.0792°N 106.0086°W
- Country: United States
- State: Colorado
- County: Conejos
- Incorporated (town): December 29, 1889

Government
  - Type: statutory town

Area
  - Total: 0.427 sq mi (1.105 km^{2})
  - Land: 0.427 sq mi (1.105 km^{2})
  - Water: 0 sq mi (0.000 km^{2})
- Elevation: 7,888 ft (2,404 m)

Population (2020)
  - Total: 647
  - Density: 1,516/sq mi (585/km^{2})
- Time zone: UTC−07:00 (MST)
  - Summer (DST): UTC−06:00 (MDT)
- ZIP code: 81120
- Area code: 719
- GNIS pop ID: 190909
- GNIS town ID: 2412370
- FIPS code: 08-02355

Antonito (in Spanish Antoñito) is a statutory town located in Conejos County, Colorado, United States. The town population was 647 at the 2020 United States census.

== History ==
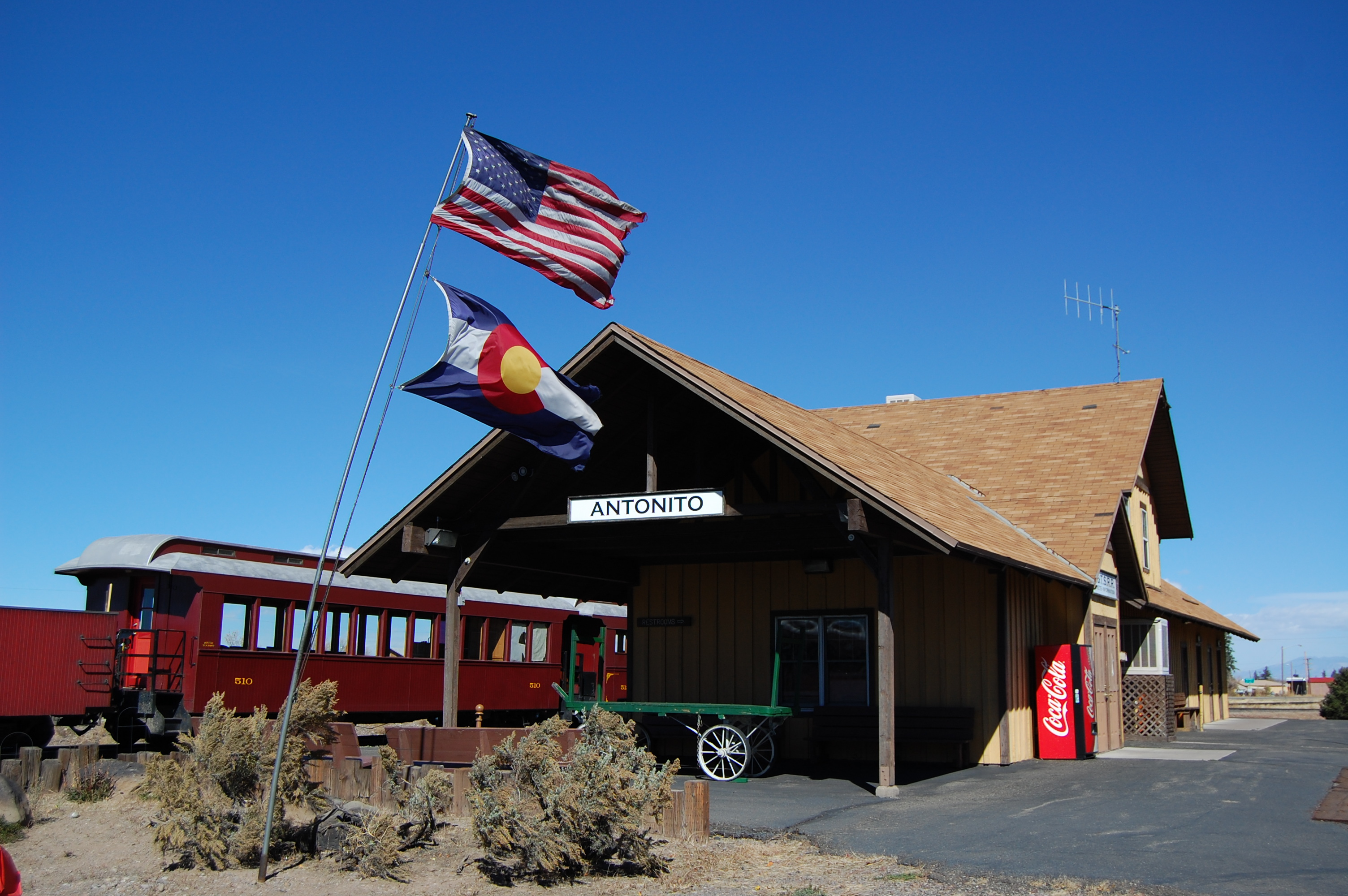
C&TS terminus (2012)

Antonito began life as a sheep herding camp known as San Antonio Junction, referring to its proximity to the Conejos and San Antonio rivers. When the Denver & Rio Grande Railroad built its line south from Alamosa, the town was renamed Antonito and became an important town on the railroad line. The San Antonio, Colorado, post office moved north to Antonito on January 24, 1881, and the Town of Antonito was incorporated on December 29, 1889. There are currently no major industries located in Antonito, but the historic Cumbres & Toltec Scenic Railroad has one terminus in Antonito and the other in Chama, New Mexico. The C&TS also has maintenance facilities and rail yard in the town. The Colorado Pacific Rio Grande Railroad continues to operate the rail line from Antonito to Alamosa.

In 2015, a Colorado State Highway project rebuilt the stretch of Highway 285 that runs through town. The new highway has helped beautify the downtown area and improve traffic flow.

The city has a number of unique buildings, including a historic Denver & Rio Grande Western Railroad depot, one of only a few lava rock depots still existing in the United States. Currently in a state of disrepair, a grant to restore the building is in the works. Cano's Castle, a folk-art home constructed by a local resident, attracts attention from tourists and local residents alike. Just south of town, Colorado Parks and Wildlife and Conejos County have jointly developed an outdoor shooting range with areas for rifle sighting as well as target practice ranges for various types of rifles and handguns. An indoor archery range and nearby hunting and fishing opportunities attract outdoor enthusiasts.

A library, tire repair shop and a new medical clinic have opened in recent years and Family Dollar recently built a store in Antonito. The South Conejos School District recently constructed a new South Conejos Jr. and Sr. High School in the town.

Several scenes from the prologue of Indiana Jones and the Last Crusade were filmed in and around Antonito, including scenes depicting the Jones family home. This century-old structure is currently used as a bed and breakfast.

The town is known for its many murals, most of them painted by Fred Haberlein.

Antonito is the location of the oldest church building and congregation in Colorado, Our Lady of Guadalupe Catholic Church, built in 1857.

Following the legalization of cannabis in Colorado, Antonito took advantage of its location along the New Mexico border (where cannabis was illegal until 2022) to become a destination for New Mexico residents seeking to legally purchase cannabis. The tax revenue resulted in a $295,000 annual increase to the city budget.

== Geography ==
Antonito is located in the San Luis Valley near the southern border of Colorado along U.S. Highway 285. It is 28 miles (45 km) north to Alamosa and 30 miles (48 km) south to U.S. Route 64 at Tres Piedras, New Mexico.

At the 2020 United States census, Antonito had a total area of 273 acres (1.105 km^{2}), all of it land.

Antonito is the southern terminus of the San Luis and Rio Grande Railroad and the eastern terminus of the steam powered, narrow gauge Cumbres & Toltec Scenic Railroad, which runs westwards to Osier, Colorado, and Chama, New Mexico.

== Demographics ==
Historical population
| Census | Pop. | Note | %± |
|---|---|---|---|
| 1890 | 315 | | — |
| 1900 | 347 | | 10.2% |
| 1910 | 681 | | 96.3% |
| 1920 | 946 | | 38.9% |
| 1930 | 858 | | −9.3% |
| 1940 | 1,220 | | 42.2% |
| 1950 | 1,255 | | 2.9% |
| 1960 | 1,045 | | −16.7% |
| 1970 | 1,113 | | 6.5% |
| 1980 | 1,103 | | −0.9% |
| 1990 | 875 | | −20.7% |
| 2000 | 873 | | −0.2% |
| 2010 | 781 | | −10.5% |
| 2020 | 647 | | −17.2% |

At the 2000 census, there were 873 people, 357 households and 234 families residing in the town. The population density was 2,212.3 inhabitants per square mile (854.2/km^{2}). There were 396 housing units at an average density of 1,003.5 per square mile (387.5/km^{2}). The racial makeup of the town was 61.40% White, 0.11% African American, 3.55% Native American, 0.23% Asian, 31.96% from other races, and 2.75% from two or more races. Hispanic or Latino of any race were 90.26% of the population.

There were 357 households, of which 33.9% had children under the age of 18 living with them, 37.8% were married couples living together, 20.4% had a female householder with no husband present, and 34.2% were non-families. 31.9% of all households were made up of individuals, and 16.5% had someone living alone who was 65 years of age or older. The average household size was 2.45 and the average family size was 3.09.

28.8% of the population were under the age of 18, 8.4% from 18 to 24, 23.1% from 25 to 44, 21.4% from 45 to 64, and 18.3% who were 65 years of age or older. The median age was 36 years. For every 100 females, there were 98.9 males. For every 100 females age 18 and over, there were 91.4 males.

The median household income was $19,205 and the median family income was $23,162. Males had a median income of $25,417 compared with $17,500 for females. The per capita income for the town was $10,047. About 26.4% of families and 29.6% of the population were below the poverty line, including 36.3% of those under age 18 and 22.5% of those age 65 or over.

== Notable people ==
- Carlos F. Lucero, judge of the United States Court of Appeals for the Tenth Circuit
- Joe Mondragon, jazz musician
- Joe Vigil, running coach
- Rubel Jaramillo, 1930-2008. [US Army attached to CIA-Korea], 3 tours Vietnam War, Recipient State of Colorado Folk Art 1991, Smithsonian Museum 2006 entry: Wooden carving: Death cart.

== See also ==
- Cumbres & Toltec Scenic Railroad
- List of municipalities in Colorado
- List of populated places in Colorado
- List of post offices in Colorado
- San Luis Valley
