= Ernest Smith (disambiguation) =

Ernest Smith (1914–2005) was a Canadian soldier and recipient of the VC.

Ernest Smith may also refer to:

- Ernest Smith (artist) (1907-1975), native American artist
- Ernest Smith (baseball) (1908–?), Negro league baseball player
- Ernest Smith (boxer) (1912–?), Irish Olympic boxer
- Ernest Smith (cricketer, born 1869) (1869–1945), English cricketer
- Ernest Smith (cricketer, born 1888) (1888–1972), English cricketer
- Tiger Smith (Ernest James Smith, 1886–1979), English cricketer
- Ernest A. Smith (1864–1952), Canadian politician
- Bert Smith (footballer, born 1896) (Ernest Edwin Smith, 1896–?), footballer who played for Cardiff, Middlesbrough and Watford
- E. D. Smith (Ernest D'Israeli Smith, 1853–1948), Canadian businessman and politician
- Ernest T. Smith (1887–1964), American educator and politician
- Ernest J. Smith (1919–2004), Canadian architect
- Ernest Lester Smith (E. Lester Smith, 1904–1992), English biochemist
- Ernest O. Smith (1885–1935), American educator
- C. Ernest Smith (1894–1970), American lawyer, politician, and judge
- Ernest Keith Smith (1992-), American country music singer-songwriter

== See also ==
- Ernie Smith (disambiguation)
- Ernest Somers-Smith (1895–1950), English cricketer
- Ernest Smythe (1904–1975), English cricketer and Indian Army officer
