= Vernon Hopper =

American football coach (1911–1988)

Biographical details
- Born: October 22, 1911; Farmington, New Mexico, U.S.
- Died: December 29, 1988 (aged 77); Farmington, New Mexico, U.S.

Playing career
- ?: Western State (CO)

Coaching career (HC unless noted)

Football
- 1939–1942: Adams State

Basketball
- ?–1941: Alamosa HS (CO)
- 1939–1942: Adams State

Head coaching record
- Overall: 6–13 (football)

Vernon T. Hopper (October 22, 1911 – December 29, 1988) was an American college football and high school basketball coach. He was the third head football coach at Adams State College—now known as Adams State University—in Alamosa, Colorado from 1939 to 1942. Alongside coaching football, he was the head basketball coach for Adams State from 1939 to 1942. He was the head basketball coach for Alamosa High School until 1941. He was an athlete at Western State.

== Head coaching record ==
=== Football ===
Year	Team	Overall	Conference	Standing	Bowl/playoffs
Adams State Indians (Independent) (1939–1942)
1939	Adams State	3–2			
1940	Adams State	0–5			
1941	Adams State	1–3			
1942	Adams State	2–3			
Adams State:		6–13			
Total:		6–13			
