= 1946 New Mexico Conference football season =

American college football season

- Sport: Football
- Teams: 7
- Champion: Adams State

Football seasons
- 1945 1947

1946 New Mexico Conference football standings
	Conf.					Overall
Team	W		L		T	W		L		T
Adams State $	4	–	0	–	0	5	–	1	–	0
New Mexico Teachers	3	–	1	–	0	4	–	5	–	0
New Mexico Military	2	–	2	–	0	?	–	?	–	?
Eastern New Mexico	1	–	3	–	0	1	–	7	–	1
New Mexico Highlands	0	–	4	–	0	1	–	5	–	1
$ – Conference champion

The 1946 New Mexico Conference football season was the season of college football played by the member schools of the New Mexico Conference (NMC), later renamed the Frontier Conference, as part of the 1946 college football season. Adams State of Alamosa, Colorado, led by head coach Neal Mehring, compiled a 5–1 record and won the NMC championship.

== Conference overview ==
Conf. Rank	Team	Head coach	Conf. record	Overall record	Points scored	Points against
1	Adams State	Neal Mehring	4–0	5–1	125	53
2	New Mexico State Teachers	Raymond J. Brancheau	3–1	4–5	75	121
3	New Mexico Military	Maj. L.T. Godfrey	2–2	3–4	107	149
4	Eastern New Mexico	Al Garten	1–3	1–7–1	46	209
5	New Mexico Highlands		0–4	2–5	38	99

== Teams ==
=== Adams State ===
1946 Adams State Indians football

NMC champion
- Conference: New Mexico Conference
- Record: 5–1 (4–0 NMC)
- Head coach: Neal Mehring (1st season)

The 1946 Adams State Indians football team was an American football team that represented Adams State Teachers College (now known as Adams State University) as a member of the New Mexico Conference (NMC) during the 1946 college football season. In their first season under head coach Neal Mehring, the team compiled a 5–1 record, won the NMC championship, and outscored opponents by a total of 125 to 53.

Date	Opponent	Site	Result	Source
September 28	Fort Lewis*		W 33–7	
October 4	Eastern New Mexico	Alamosa, CO	W 26–0	
October 12	at New Mexico Highlands	Las Vegas, NM	W 13–0	
October 26	New Mexico Military	Alamosa, CO	W 40–6	
November 2	at New Mexico Teachers	Silver City, NM	W 13–7	
November 9	Western State (CO)*	Alamosa, CO	L 0–33	
*Non-conference game

=== New Mexico State Teachers ===
The 1946 New Mexico State Teachers Mustangs football team represented New Mexico State Teachers College of Silver City, New Mexico, during the 1946 college football season. Led by head coach Raymond J. Brancheau, the Mustangs compiled a 4–5 record (3–1 against NMC opponents), finished second in the NMC, and were outscored by a total of 121 to 75.

Date	Opponent	Site	Result	Attendance	Source
September 21	at New Mexico A&M*	Quesenberry Field; Las Cruces, NM	L 0–37	3,500	
September 28	at Arizona State–Flagstaff*	Skidmore Field; Flagstaff, AZ	L 0–32		
October 5	Gila Junior College*	Silver City, NM	L 12–21		
October 12	Eastern New Mexico	Silver City, NM	W 7–0		
October 19	Panhandle A&M*	Silver City, NM	W 14–0		
October 26	New Mexico Highlands	Las Vegas, NM	W 6–0		
November 2	Adams State	Silver City, NM	L 7–12		
November 16	at New Mexico Military	Roswell, NM	W 25–7		
November 28	at Gila Junior College*	Thatcher, AZ	L 6–12		
*Non-conference game

=== New Mexico Military ===
The 1946 New Mexico Military Broncos football team represented New Mexico Military Institute of Roswell, New Mexico, during the 1946 college football season. Led by head coach Major L.T. Godfrey, the Broncos compiled a 3–4 record (2–2 against NMC opponents), finished third in the NMC, and were outscored by a total of 149 to 107.

Date	Opponent	Site	Result	Source
October 5	Wentworth*	Roswell, NM	L 6–20	
October 19	at Sul Ross*	Alpine, TX	L 0–38	
October 26	at Adams State	Alamosa, CO	L 6–40	
November 2	New Mexico Highlands	Roswell, NM	W 41–13	
November 9	Panhandle A&M*	Roswell, NM	W 33–6	
November 16	New Mexico Teachers	Roswell, NM	L 7–25	
November 23	at Eastern New Mexico	Portales, NM	W 14–7	
*Non-conference game

=== Eastern New Mexico ===
The 1946 Eastern New Mexico Greyhounds football team represented Eastern New Mexico University of Portales, New Mexico, during the 1946 college football season. Led by head coach Al Garten (10th season), the Greyhounds compiled a 1–7–1 record (1–3 against NMC opponents), finished fourth in the NMC, and were outscored by a total of 209 to 46.

Date	Opponent	Site	Result	Source
September 21	Panhandle A&M*	Portales, NM	T 0–0	
September 28	at McMurry*	Abilene, TX	L 7–43	
October 4	at Adams State	Alamosa, CO	L 0–26	
October 12	at New Mexico State Teachers	Silver City, NM	L 0–7	
October 19	New Mexico Highlands	Portales, NM	W 13–7	
October 26	Sul Ross*	Alpine, TX	L 0–32	
November 8	vs. Arizona State–Flagstaff*	Clovis, NM	L 7–33	
November 16	Southwestern Tech*	Portales, NM	L 12–47	
November 23	New Mexico Military	Portales, NM	L 7–14	
*Non-conference game

=== New Mexico Highlands ===
The 1946 New Mexico Highlands Cowboys football team represented New Mexico Highlands University of Las Vegas, New Mexico, during the 1946 college football season. The Cowboys compiled a 2–5 record (0–4 against NMC opponents), finished last in the NMC, and were outscored by a total of 99 to 38.

Date	Opponent	Site	Result	Source
September 20	at Pueblo*	Pueblo, CO	W 6–0	
September 28	Trinidad*	Las Vegas, NM	L 6–19	
October 12	Adams State	Las Vegas, NM	L 0–13	
October 19	at Eastern New Mexico	Portales, NM	L 7–13	
October 26	New Mexico State Teachers	Las Vegas, NM	L 0–6	
November 2	at New Mexico Military	Roswell, NM	L 13–41	
November 15	Fort Lewis*	Las Vegas, NM	W 12–7	
*Non-conference game
