= Neal Mehring =

American football player and coach (1910–1995)

Biographical details
- Born: March 1, 1910; Rocky Ford, Colorado, U.S.
- Died: January 10, 1995 (aged 84); Littleton, Colorado, U.S.
- Education: University of Nebraska–Lincoln (1936); University of Colorado Boulder

Playing career

Football
- 1932–1934: Nebraska
- Position: Guard

Coaching career (HC unless noted)

Football
- 1936: Lincoln HS (NE) (assistant)
- 1937–1944: Salida HS (CO) (assistant)
- 1945: La Junta HS (CO)
- 1946–1947: Adams State
- 1948–1951: Nebraska (assistant)

Basketball
- 1946–1947: Adams State
- 1948–1951: Nebraska (assistant)

Head coaching record
- Overall: 11–4 (college football)

Accomplishments and honors

Championships
- 1 NMC (1946)

Neal Eugene Mehring (March 1, 1910 – January 10, 1995) was an American college football and basketball coach. He was the fourth head football coach at Adams State College—now known as Adams State University—in Alamosa, Colorado, serving for two seasons from 1946 to 1947. He was the head football coach for La Junta High School in 1945. He also coached football for Lincoln High School, Salida High School, and Nebraska. He was the head basketball coach for Adams State and an assistant for Nebraska. He played college football for Nebraska as a guard.

== Head coaching record ==
=== College football ===
Year	Team	Overall	Conference	Standing	Bowl/playoffs
Adams State Indians (New Mexico Conference) (1946–1947)
1946	Adams State	5–1	4–0	1st	
1947	Adams State	6–3	5–1	2nd	
Adams State:		11–4	9–1		
Total:		11–4			
National championship Conference title Conference division title or championship game berth
