= List of Northern Arizona Lumberjacks head football coaches =

List of head football coaches for the Northern Arizona Lumberjacks

The Northern Arizona Lumberjacks college football team represents Northern Arizona University in the Big Sky Conference (Big Sky), as part of the NCAA Division I Football Championship Subdivision. The program has had 31 head coaches since it began play during the 1915 season. Since December 2023, Brian Wright has served as Northern Arizona's head coach.

Four coaches have led Northern Arizona in the postseason: Max Spilsbury, Joe Salem, Steve Axman, and Jerome Souers. Three of those coaches also won conference championships: Spilsbury captured seven as a member of the Frontier Conference. Salem and Souers each captured one as a member of the Big Sky.

Souers is the leader in seasons coached, with 21 years as head coach and games coached (237) and won (123). Robert G. Stevenson has the highest winning percentage of those who have coached more than one game, with .857. Earl Insley has the lowest winning percentage at .167.

== Key ==
Key to symbols in coaches list
General		Overall		Conference		Postseason (Note: Although the first Rose Bowl Game was played in 1902, it has been continuously played since the 1916 game, and is recognized as the oldest bowl game by the NCAA. "—" indicates any season prior to 1916 when postseason games were not played.)	
No.	Order of coaches (Note: A running total of the number of head coaches, with coaches who served separate tenures being counted only once. Interim head coaches are represented with "Int" and are not counted in the running total. "—" indicates the team played but either without a coach or no coach is on record. "X" indicates an interim year without play.)	GC	Games coached	CW	Conference wins	PW	Postseason wins
DC	Division championships	OW	Overall wins	CL	Conference losses	PL	Postseason losses
CC	Conference championships	OL	Overall losses	CT	Conference ties	PT	Postseason ties
NC	National championships	OT	Overall ties (Note: Overtime rules in college football were introduced in 1996, making ties impossible in the period since.)	C%	Conference winning percentage		
†	Elected to the College Football Hall of Fame	O%	Overall winning percentage (Note: When computing the win–loss percentage, a tie counts as half a win and half a loss.)				

== Coaches ==
List of head football coaches showing season(s) coached, overall records, conference records (Note: Northern Arizona has been a member of Big Sky Conference since the 1970 season.), postseason records, championships and selected awards (Note: Statistics correct as of the end of the 2025 NCAA Division I FCS football season.)
No.	Name	Season(s)	GC	OW	OL	OT	O%	CW	CL	CT	C%	PW	PL	PT	CCs	NCs	Awards
1	Clarence Thorpe	1915–1917	14	9	5	0	0.643	—	—	—	—	—	—	—	—	0	—
2	R. A. Fuller	1918	1	1	0	0	1.000	—	—	—	—	—	—	—	—	0	—
3	Earl A. Lawver	1919	1	1	1	0	0.500	—	—	—	—	—	—	—	—	0	—
4	J. Phil McVey Lacey Eastburn	1920	5	3	2	0	0.600	—	—	—	—	—	—	—	—	0	—
5	R. H. Drake	1921–1922	12	4	7	1	0.375	—	—	—	—	—	—	—	—	0	—
6	Robert G. Stevenson	1923	7	6	1	0	0.857	—	—	—	—	—	—	—	—	0	—
7	William E. Rogers	1924	8	4	4	0	0.500	—	—	—	—	—	—	—	—	0	—
8	Talbert D. Jessuppe	1925	6	2	3	1	0.417	—	—	—	—	—	—	—	—	0	—
9	Emzy Harvey Lynch	1926	7	5	2	0	0.714	—	—	—	—	—	—	—	—	0	—
10	Rudy Lavik	1927–1932	44	28	11	5	0.693	3	5	0	0.375	—	—	—	0	0	—
11	Ira MacIntosh	1933–1935	22	9	9	4	0.500	3	7	2	0.333	—	—	—	0	0	—
12	Garrett Arbelbide	1936–1939	35	11	21	3	0.357	3	12	1	0.219	—	—	—	0	0	—
13	Maurice Moulder	1940–1942	22	6	16	0	0.273	2	14	0	0.125	—	—	—	0	0	—
14	Frank Brickey	1943–1946	20	10	8	2	0.550	1	2	1	0.375	—	—	—	0	0	—
15	Nick Ragus	1947–1948	17	5	12	0	0.294	1	6	0	0.143	—	—	—	0	0	—
16	Emil Ladyko	1949	8	1	6	1	0.188	0	3	0	.000	—	—	—	0	0	—
17	Ben Reiges	1950	9	2	7	0	0.222	0	4	0	.000	—	—	—	0	0	—
18	John Pederson	1951–1953	23	7	16	0	0.304	3	5	0	0.375	—	—	—	0	0	—
19	Earl Insley	1954–1955	18	3	15	0	0.167	1	9	0	0.100	—	—	—	0	0	—
20	Max Spilsbury	1956–1964	88	58	25	5	0.688	17	0	2	0.947	1	1	0	7	0	—
21	Andy MacDonald	1965–1968	40	22	17	1	0.563	—	—	—	—	0	0	0	—	0	—
22	John Symank	1969–1970	20	9	11	0	0.450	0	4	0	.000	0	0	0	0	0	—
23	Ed Peasley	1971–1974	40	15	25	0	0.375	5	13	0	0.278	0	0	0	0	0	—
24	Joe Salem	1975–1978	43	26	17	0	0.605	15	9	0	0.625	0	1	0	1	0	—
25	Dwain Painter	1979–1981	33	16	17	0	0.485	8	13	0	0.381	0	0	0	0	0	—
26	Joe Harper	1982–1984	32	12	20	0	0.375	7	14	0	0.333	0	0	0	0	0	—
27	Larry Kentera	1985–1989	55	26	29	0	0.473	16	22	0	0.421	0	0	0	0	0	—
28	Steve Axman	1990–1997	89	48	41	0	0.539	28	32	0	0.467	0	1	0	0	0	—
29	Jerome Souers	1998–2018	237	123	114	—	0.519	85	77	—	0.525	1	5	—	1	0	—
30	Chris Ball	2019–2023	50	20	30	—	0.400	16	21	—	0.432	0	0	—	0	0	—
31	Brian Wright	2024–present	25	15	10	—	0.600	10	6	—	0.625	0	1	—	0	0	—
