= Orval Steffen =

American football coach (1921–1996)

Biographical details
- Born: May 15, 1921; Aspen, Colorado, U.S.
- Died: June 1, 1996 (aged 75); Sonoma, California, U.S.
- Education: Colorado State College of Agriculture and Mechanic Arts (1947)

Playing career
- c. 1940s: Colorado A&M
- 1944–1945: Oakland Giants
- Position: Guard

Coaching career (HC unless noted)
- 1947–1949: Alamosa HS (CO)
- 1950–1951: Adams State
- 1952–1953: Lincoln HS (OR)
- 1954–1955: Mount Diablo HS (CA)

Head coaching record
- Overall: 5–11–2 (college); 31–4 (high school; Alamosa)

Orval Richard Steffen (May 15, 1921 – June 1, 1996) was an American college and high school football coach. He was the sixth head football coach at Adams State College—now known as Adams State University—in Alamosa, Colorado from 1950 until 1951. He played college football for Colorado A&M and professionally for the Oakland Giants of the Pacific Coast Professional Football League (PCPFL) as a guard. He was the head football coach for Alamosa High School from 1947 to 1949, Lincoln High School from 1952 to 1953, and Mount Diablo High School from 1954 to 1955. He also served for four years in the United States Navy as a chief petty officer.

== Head coaching record ==
=== College ===
Year	Team	Overall	Conference	Standing	Bowl/playoffs
Adams State Indians (New Mexico Conference) (1950–1951)
1950	Adams State	2–5–2	2–2–1	3rd	
1951	Adams State	3–6	3–2	3rd	
Adams State:		5–11–2	5–4–1		
Total:		5–11–2			
