= Clarence Thorpe =

Clarence Thorpe may refer to:

- Clarence Thorpe (American football) (1887–1959), American football player and coach
- Clarence Thorpe (baseball) (1909–1985), American Negro league pitcher
