= David Elsenrath =

American football player and coach (born 1962)

Biographical details
- Born: June 30, 1962 (age 64)

Playing career
- c. 1985: Missouri–Rolla

Coaching career (HC unless noted)
- 1986–1987: Auburn (GA)
- 1992–1993: Louisville (assistant)
- 1988–1991: Valdosta State (OL/RC)
- 1994–1996: Eastern Kentucky (assistant)
- 1997–1999: Adams State
- 2003–2004: Tusculum (OL)
- 2005–2006: Tusculum (OC)
- 2007–2011: Valdosta State (AHC/OL/RC)
- 2015: Cohulla Creek (OL/DL)
- 2022-2025: Copiah–Lincoln (OL)

Head coaching record
- Overall: 9–22

David Elsenrath (born June 30, 1962) is an American former football coach. He was the 20th head football coach at Adams State College—now known as Adams State University—in Alamosa, Colorado, serving for three seasons, from 1997 to 1999, and compiling a record of 9–22.

Elsenrath played college football at the University of Missouri–Rolla—now known as Missouri University of Science and Technology. He earned a master's of education at Auburn University, where he began his coaching career in 1986 as a graduate assistant on Pat Dye's staff.

Head coach and assistant coach for many programs, he now spends his days coaching high school football students with the goal of creating more college players. He has produced thirteen D1 athletes.

== Head coaching record ==
| Year | Team | Overall | Conference | Standing | Bowl/playoffs |
|---|---|---|---|---|---|
Adams State Grizzlies (Rocky Mountain Athletic Conference) (1997–1999)
| 1997 | Adams State | 1–10 | 1–7 | T–8th | |
| 1998 | Adams State | 4–6 | 3–5 | 6th | |
| 1999 | Adams State | 4–6 | 4–4 | T–4th | |
| Adams State: | | 9–22 | 8–16 | | |
| Total: | | 9–22 | | | |
