= Josh Blankenship =

American football player and coach (born 1980)

Current position
- Title: None
- Team: None

Biographical details
- Born: November 13, 1980 (age 45); Tulsa, Oklahoma, U.S.

Playing career
- 1999–2001: Tulsa
- 2002: Eastern Washington
- 2003: Miami Dolphins
- 2004: Austin Wranglers
- 2004: Edmonton Eskimos
- 2005–2006: Memphis Xplorers
- 2006: Stockton Lightning
- 2007: Tulsa Talons
- Position: Quarterback

Coaching career (HC unless noted)
- 2003–2005: Union HS (OK) (QB)
- 2006: Northeast Oklahoma Association of Homeschools (OC)
- 2007–2010: Union HS (OK) (QB)
- 2011–2013: Muskogee HS (OK)
- 2014: Tulsa (QB)
- 2015–2017: Adams State (OC/WR)
- 2018–2020: Adams State
- 2021–2024: Broken Arrow HS (OK)

Head coaching record
- Overall: 8–14 (college)

Accomplishments and honors

Awards
- Big Sky Offensive Player of the Year (2002); Big Sky Newcomer of the Year (2002); First-team All-Big Sky Conference (2002); WAC Freshman of the Year (1999)

Josh Blankenship (born November 13, 1980) is an American football coach and former player. He was the head football coach at Broken Arrow High School in Broken Arrow, Oklahoma. Blankenship served as the head football coach at Adams State University in Alamosa, Colorado from 2018 until his resignation in January 2021. Blankenship played college football at the University of Tulsa for three years before playing his last year at Eastern Washington University. He is the son of former Tulsa head football coach Bill Blankenship. Blankenship resigned as the Broken Arrow High School Head Football Coach concluding the 2024 season. He finished his four years at the school with an overall record of 20 wins and 26 losses.

== Head coaching record ==
=== College ===
Year	Team	Overall	Conference	Standing	Bowl/playoffs
Adams State Grizzlies (Rocky Mountain Athletic Conference) (2018–2020)
2018	Adams State	4–7	4–6	T–6th	
2019	Adams State	4–7	4–6	7th	
2020–21	No team—COVID-19				
Adams State:		8–14	8–12		
Total:		8–14			
