= Joe Vigil =

American track and field coach (1929–2025)

- Born: Joseph Isabel Vigil; November 25, 1929; Antonito, Colorado, U.S.
- Died: July 19, 2025 (aged 95); Green Valley, Arizona, U.S.
- Education: Adams State University (BA, MA); Colorado College (MS); University of New Mexico (PhD)
- Occupation: Athletics coach

Joseph Isabel Vigil (November 25, 1929 – July 19, 2025) was an American track and field coach who specialized in long-distance running. From 1965 to 1993 he coached and taught at Adams State University, his alma mater, before shifting his focus to coaching elite athletes.

Over his extensive career, Vigil coached numerous top athletes, including Meb Keflezighi, an Olympic silver medalist; Deena Kastor, an Olympic bronze medalist and former American record holder in the marathon; and Pat Porter, a national champion in the 10,000 meters and two-time Olympian. Vigil's coaching legacy includes mentoring over 20 Olympians and 425 All-Americans. His achievements in the sport were recognized in 2015 when he was awarded the Legend Coach Award by USA Track & Field.

== Early life and education ==
Born in Antonito, Colorado on November 25, 1929, Vigil moved to Alamosa, Colorado, where he attended high school. He was raised by his mother and was an active boy scout and football player.

After high school and a brief spell of two years in the United States Navy, Vigil attended Adams State College as an undergraduate where he earned his Bachelor of Arts in biology and played football. He went on to earn his Master of Arts in education at Adams State in 1959. He then obtained a Master of Science in chemistry from Colorado College in 1964 before completing his doctorate in exercise physiology at the University of New Mexico in 1972.

== Coaching career ==
Vigil started his coaching career at his old high school, Alamosa High School, where he also taught for 12 years before becoming a coach at Adams State.

During the buildup to the 1968 Mexico City Olympics, Vigil served on a committee to organize the first U.S. Olympic Marathon Trials in Alamosa, which has a similar altitude to Mexico City. He had worked with Leonard "Buddy" Edelen, the American record holder in the marathon at the time, to convince the American Athletics Union to host the trials in Alamosa.

Vigil coached and taught at Adams State from 1965 to 1993, taking the university to 19 national titles at track and field, and cross-country. He coached 425 All-Americans and 87 individual national champions during his 29-year tenure at the university. Vigil, who often emphasized the importance of education, maintained a 95% graduation rate for student-athletes during his collegiate coaching career.

In 1997, Vigil was head coach of the United States Pan-American Games Team.

In 1998, Vigil was the long-distance running coach for the United States Olympics Team.

He was also coach for seven world cross country championships.

== Personal life and death ==
Vigil was married twice, and had two daughters from his first marriage, which ended in divorce. He later married Caroline Winfield, and was married for 47 years at the time of his death. Vigil died after a short illness in Green Valley, Arizona on July 19, 2025, at the age of 95.

== Achievements and accolades ==
Vigil has a statue erected in his honor at Adams State University where he was granted the title of Professor Emeritus in 1986.

In 1991, Vigil was elected to the Colorado Sports Hall of Fame. He has also been inducted into the National Association of Intercollegiate Athletics (NAIA) Hall of Fame (1978), Adams State University Hall of Fame (2000), Rocky Mountain Athletic Conference Coaches Hall of Fame (2005), Road Runners Club of America Hall of Fame (2005), National Collegiate Athletic Association (NCAA) Cross Country Coaches Hall of Fame (2007), Adams State University Educators Hall of Fame (2015), Latino Leadership Institute Hall of Fame (2016), among others.

In 2015, Vigil was awarded the accolade of USA Track & Field's Legend Coach award. This follows on from his achievement of being National Coach of the year fourteen times. Among the many athletes he coached was Pat Porter (1959–2012), an American national track and field champion in the 10,000 meters (as well as in cross country), as well as a two-time Olympian on the U.S. track teams in 1984 and 1988.

In 2018, Vigil was awarded the accolade of World Athletics Awards Coaching Achievement Award.

17 athletes who were coached by Vigil have set national records, including Olympian Deena Kastor. He coached over 20 Olympians throughout his career.

Published in 2020, Chasing Excellence by Pat Melgares tells the story of Coach Vigil's life, coaching successes, and his Vigilosophy.
