= 1954 Arizona State–Flagstaff Lumberjacks football team =

American college football season

1954 Arizona State–Flagstaff Lumberjacks football
- Conference: New Mexico Conference
- Record: 3–6 (1–4 NMC)
- Head coach: Earl Insley (1st season)
- Home stadium: Skidmore Field

1954 New Mexico Conference football standings
	Conf.					Overall
Team	W		L		T	W		L		T
Panhandle A&M $	5	–	0	–	0	6	–	3	–	0
Adams State	3	–	2	–	0	3	–	6	–	0
New Mexico Highlands	2	–	2	–	1	5	–	2	–	1
New Mexico Western	2	–	3	–	0	4	–	4	–	0
New Mexico Military	1	–	3	–	1	1	–	5	–	1
Arizona State–Flagstaff	1	–	4	–	0	3	–	6	–	0
$ – Conference champion

The 1954 Arizona State–Flagstaff Lumberjacks football team was an American football team that represented Arizona State College at Flagstaff (now known as Northern Arizona University) in the New Mexico Conference during the 1954 college football season. In their first year under head coach Earl Insley, the Lumberjacks compiled a 3–6 record (1–4 against conference opponents), finished last in the conference, and were outscored by a total of 167 to 130.

The team played its home games at Skidmore Field in Flagstaff, Arizona.

== Schedule ==
Date	Opponent	Site	Result	Attendance	Source
September 18	at Redlands*	UR Stadium; Redlands, CA	W 14–0	2,500	
September 25	at Adams State	Alamosa, CO	L 12–20		
October 2	Whittier*	Skidmore Field; Flagstaff, AZ	L 16–20		
October 9	La Verne*	Skidmore Field; Flagstaff, AZ	W 35–19		
October 16	New Mexico Military^{†}	Skidmore Field; Flagstaff, AZ	W 13–7		
October 23	New Mexico Highlands	Skidmore Field; Flagstaff, AZ	L 13–27		
October 30	Panhandle A&M	Skidmore Field; Flagstaff, AZ	L 14–21		
November 6	at New Mexico Western	Silver City, NM	L 6–7		
November 11	at Idaho State*	Spud Bowl; Poctatello, ID	L 7–46	4,000	
*Non-conference game; ^{†}Homecoming
