= William C. Heiss =

American football player and coach (1923–2020)

Biographical details
- Born: April 25, 1923; Springfield, Illinois, U.S.
- Died: May 27, 2020 (aged 97)

Playing career

Football
- 1944–1946: Illinois
- Positions: End, fullback

Coaching career (HC unless noted)

Football
- 1947: Detroit (ends/freshmen)
- 1948–1949: Adams State
- 1950: St. Cloud State
- 1951–1953: Colorado College
- 1954: Iowa State (backfield)
- 1955–1958: Denver (ends)
- 1963–1965: Colorado State–Greeley

Basketball
- 1947–1948: Detroit (freshmen)
- 1951–1952: Colorado College

Baseball
- 1955–1959: Denver

Tennis
- 1965–1981: Colorado State–Greeley / Northern Colorado

Head coaching record
- Overall: 40–34–5 (football); 2–14 (basketball); 70–61–1 (baseball)

Accomplishments and honors

Championships
- Baseball; 1 Skyline (1957)

William Conrad Heiss Jr. (April 25, 1923 – May 27, 2020) was an American football player and coach of multiple sports. He served as the head football coach at Adams State College (1948–1949), St. Cloud State University (1950), Colorado College (1951–1953), and the University of Northern Colorado (1963–1965), compiling a career college football record of 40–34–5. Heiss was also the head basketball coach at Colorado College for one season in 1951–52, tallying a mark of 2–14, and the head baseball coach at the University of Denver from 1955 to 1959, amassing a record of 70–61–1. His 1957 baseball team won the Skyline Conference championship. Heiss played college football at the University of Illinois at Urbana–Champaign in the mid-1940s.

== Early life and playing career ==
Heiss attended West Aurora High School in Aurora, Illinois. He then played football at the University of Illinois at Urbana–Champaign, primarily as an end, from 1944 to 1946. The 1946 Illinois team won the Big Ten Conference championship, with Heiss leading the team in pass receptions on offense and interceptions on defense. On October 26 of that season, Illinois visited Michigan in Ann Arbor for a game that ultimately decided the conference title. With the Illini trailing 7–0 in the first half, Heiss caught a 30-yard pass from Perry Moss, advancing to the Michigan 16-yard line and setting up a touchdown by Paul Patterson that tied the score going into halftime. Illinois won the game, 13–9. The Illini finished the season at the Rose Bowl on January 1, 1947, beating UCLA, 45–14.

== Coaching career ==
=== University of Detroit ===
Heiss was an assistant football coach and freshman basketball coach at the University of Detroit in 1947–48.

=== Adams State ===
Heiss was the fifth head football coach at Adams State College in Alamosa, Colorado and he held that position for two seasons, from 1948 until 1949, winning the New Mexico conference in 1949. His coaching record at Adams State was 11–5–1.

=== St. Cloud State ===
During 1950–51, Heiss was the head football, wrestling, and tennis coach at St. Cloud State Teachers College. He won conference and AAU championships in wrestling.

=== Colorado College ===
From 1951 to 1953, Heiss was the head football coach at Colorado College.

=== Iowa State ===
Heiss was an assistant football coach at Iowa State University in 1954.

=== Denver ===
From 1955 to 1959, Heiss was an assistant football coach and head baseball coach at the University of Denver. In March 1958, he interviewed for the head football coaching position at Montana State University.

=== Northern Colorado ===
Heiss coached at the University of Northern Colorado in Greeley, Colorado for three seasons, from 1963 to 1965, compiling a record of 12–14–2. A rarity occurred in the 1964 season when the opposing team, Northern Arizona, forfeited the game on December 10, 1964. From 1965 to 1981, Heiss was the head tennis coach at Northern Colorado. He twice won the school's Coach of the Year award.

== Death ==
Heiss died on May 27, 2020.

== Head coaching record ==
=== Football ===
Year	Team	Overall	Conference	Standing	Bowl/playoffs
Adams State Indians (New Mexico Conference) (1948–1949)
1948	Adams State	6–2	3–1	2nd	
1949	Adams State	5–3–1	3–1–1	2nd	
Adams State:		11–5–1	6–2–1		
St. Cloud State Huskies (Minnesota State College Conference) (1950)
1950	St. Cloud State	4–4	2–2	3rd	
St. Cloud State:		4–4	2–2		
Colorado College Tigers (Rocky Mountain Conference) (1951–1953)
1951	Colorado College	4–5	3–2	T–2nd	
1952	Colorado College	7–2	4–1	2nd	
1953	Colorado College	2–4–2	1–2–2	4th	
Colorado College:		13–11–2	8–5–2		
Colorado State–Greeley Bears (Rocky Mountain Conference) (1963–1965)
1963	Colorado State–Greeley	4–5	2–2	3rd	
1964	Colorado State–Greeley	4–5	1–2	3rd	
1965	Colorado State–Greeley	4–4–2	2–1	2nd	
Colorado State–Greeley:		12–14–2	5–5		
Total:		40–34–5			
