= Ernie Smith (American football coach) =

American football coach

Ernie E. Smith
Biographical details
- Born: c. 1920

Coaching career (HC unless noted)
- 1951–1955: Holly HS (CO)
- 1956: Adams State (line)
- 1957–1958: Adams State
- 1959–1966: Holly HS (CO)
- 1967: Southern Colorado (line)

Head coaching record
- Overall: 1–17–1 (college); 55–5 (high school)

Ernie E. Smith was an American football coach. He was the eighth head football coach at Adams State College—now known as Adams State University—in Alamosa, Colorado, serving for two seasons, from 1957 to 1958, and compiled a record of 1–17–1.

Smith played college football at Colorado State College of Education—now known as University of Northern Colorado, where he was All-Rocky Mountain Conference selection at tackle. From 1951 to 1955, he coached football at Holly High School in Holly, Colorado, where he led his teams to a record of 55–5 and three state championships in five seasons. Smith joined the coaching staff at Adams State in 1956 as line coach under head football coach Michael Stimack.

Smith resigned from his post at Adams State after the 1958 season. In 1967, he was hired to coach the line at Southern Colorado State College—now known as Colorado State University Pueblo—under head football coach Joe Prater.

== Head coaching record ==
=== College ===
Year	Team	Overall	Conference	Standing	Bowl/playoffs
Adams State Indians (Rocky Mountain Conference) (1957–1958)
1957	Adams State	0–9–1	0–4–1	6th	
1958	Adams State	1–8	1–4	5th	
Adams State:		1–17–1	1–8–1		
Total:		1–17–1			
