= Donald McKillip =

American football coach and administrator

Biographical details
- Born: September 6, 1924; Denver, Colorado, U.S.
- Died: February 22, 2008 (aged 83); Concord, Nebraska, U.S.

Coaching career (HC unless noted)
- 1953–1958: Red Willow HS (NE)
- 1959–1962: McCook
- 1963–1967: Adams State
- 1969: Adams State

Administrative career (AD unless noted)
- 1970–1989: Saint Mary's

Head coaching record
- Overall: 40–17 (college); 30–7–2 (junior college); 45–6–2 (high school)
- Bowls: 1–0 (college)

Accomplishments and honors

Championships
- 1 RMC (1967); 1 RMAC Mountain Division (1969)

Donald J. McKillip (September 6, 1924 – February 22, 2008) was an American football coach and college athletics administrator. McKillip was the 11th head football coach at Adams State College—now known as Adams State University—in Alamosa, Colorado and he held that position for six seasons, from 1963 to 1967 and again in 1969. He served as the athletic director at Saint Mary's College of California from 1970 to 1989.

== Head coaching record ==
=== College football ===
Year	Team	Overall	Conference	Standing	Bowl/playoffs
Adams State Indians (Rocky Mountain Conference) (1963–1967)
1963	Adams State	6–4	3–1	2nd	
1964	Adams State	6–3	2–1	2nd	
1965	Adams State	5–4	1–2	3rd	
1966	Adams State	8–2	2–1	2nd	W Mineral Water Bowl
1967	Adams State	8–1	3–0	1st	
Adams State Indians (Rocky Mountain Athletic Conference) (1969)
1969	Adams State	7–3	6–1	1st (Mountain)	
Adams State:		40–17	17–6		
Total:		40–17			
National championship Conference title Conference division title or championship game berth

=== Junior college ===
Year	Team	Overall	Conference	Standing	Bowl/playoffs
McCook Indians (Empire Junior College Conference) (1959–1962)
1959	McCook		3–2–1	4th	
1960	McCook	8–2	4–2	2nd	
1961	McCook	9–1	5–1	2nd	
1962	McCook		3–1–1	2nd	
McCook:		30–7–2	15–6–2		
Total:		30–7–2			
