= Clifton White =

American football and basketball coach

Biographical details
- Born: Monte Vista, Colorado, U.S.
- Education: University of Denver; University of Oregon (1939)

Coaching career (HC unless noted)

Football
- c. 1930s: Longmont HS (CO) (assistant)
- 1930–1937: Adams State
- 1938–1940: Oregon (assistant)
- 1941–1943: Kearney State (assistant)
- 1944–1946: Anderson (IN) (assistant)
- 1947–?: Eastern Illinois (assistant)
- 1961–?: Northern Montana (assistant)

Basketball
- 1938–1940: Oregon (assistant)
- 1941–1943: Kearney State
- 1944–1946: Anderson (IN)
- 1947–?: Eastern Illinois (assistant)
- 1961–?: Northern Montana

Administrative career (AD unless noted)
- c. 1930s: Adams State
- c. 1951: Eastern Illinois (interim AD)

Head coaching record
- Overall: 12–20–5 (football); 27–31 (basketball)

Clifton W. "Red" White was an American football and basketball coach. He was the first head football coach at Adams State College—now known as Adams State University—in Alamosa, Colorado and he held that position for eight seasons, from 1930 until 1937. His coaching record at Adams State was 12–20–5. He was also coached basketball and football for Oregon, Kearney State, Anderson (IN), Eastern Illinois, and Northern Montana.

== Head coaching record ==
=== Football ===
Year	Team	Overall	Conference	Standing	Bowl/playoffs
Adams State Indians (Independent) (1930–1937)
1930	Adams State	0–1–2			
1931	Adams State	2–1–1			
1932	Adams State	1–2–1			
1933	Adams State	2–1			
1934	Adams State	1–3			
1935	Adams State	1–5–1			
1936	Adams State	3–4			
1937	Adams State	2–3			
Adams State:		12–20–5			
Total:		12–20–5			
