= 1955 Adams State Indians football team =

American college football season

1955 Adams State Indians football

NMC co-champion
- Conference: New Mexico Conference
- Record: 6–4 (4–1 NMC)
- Head coach: Michael Stimack (4th season)

1955 New Mexico Conference football standings
	Conf.					Overall
Team	W		L		T	W		L		T
New Mexico Military +	4	–	1	–	0	5	–	3	–	0
Adams State +	4	–	1	–	0	6	–	4	–	0
Panhandle A&M	3	–	2	–	0	5	–	4	–	0
New Mexico Highlands	3	–	2	–	0	5	–	2	–	1
New Mexico Western	1	–	4	–	0	3	–	6	–	0
Arizona State–Flagstaff	0	–	5	–	0	0	–	9	–	0
+ – Conference co-champions

The 1955 Adams State Indians football team represented Adams State College—now known as Adams State University—as a member of the New Mexico Conference (NMC) during the 1951 college football season. Led by fourth-year head coach Michael Stimack, the Indians compiled an overall record of 6–4 with a mark of 4–1 in conference play, sharing the NMC title with New Mexico Military.

== Schedule ==
Date	Time	Opponent	Site	Result	Attendance	Source
September 17		at Colorado College*	Washburn Field; Colorado Springs, CO	L 0–19		
September 24		at Arizona State–Flagstaff	Skidmore Field; Flagstaff, AZ	W 12–6		
October 1		New Mexico Western	Alamosa, CO	W 25–6		
October 8	8:00 p.m.	at Eastern New Mexico*	Portales, NM	W 21–13	2,200	
October 15		Panhandle A&M	Alamosa, CO	W 19–14		
October 22		at New Mexico Military	Roswell, NM	L 6–26		
October 29		New Mexico Highlands	Walsenburg, CO	W 14–7		
November 5	8:00 p.m.	at New Mexico A&M	Memorial Stadium; Las Cruces, NM	L 8–47		
November 11		Southwestern Oklahoma State	Alamosa, CO	W 24–13		
November 19		Western State (CO)*	Alamosa, CO (Spud Bowl)	L 6–27		
*Non-conference game; All times are in Mountain time
