= Wayne McGinn =

American football coach (born 1959)

Biographical details
- Born: February 14, 1959 (age 67)
- Education: Adams State University

Coaching career (HC unless noted)
- 1981: Adams State (GA)
- 1982–1984: Loveland HS (CO) (DB)
- 1985: TCU (GA)
- 1987–1995: Western State (DC)
- 1996: Western State
- 1997–1999: Western State (DC)
- 2000–2007: Adams State
- 2008: CSU Pueblo (OC)
- 2012: Pueblo Central HS (CO) (assistant)
- 2013–2018: Loveland HS (CO)
- 2019: Western Colorado (DB)

Head coaching record
- Overall: 41–57 (college)

Wayne McGinn (born February 14, 1959) is an American football coach. He served as the head football coach at Western State Colorado University—now known as Western Colorado University—in 1996 and at Adams State College—now known as Adams State University—from 2000 to 2007, compiling a career college football coaching record of 41–57.

== Coaching career ==
McGinn was the 19th head football coach at Adams State College—now known as Adams State University—in Alamosa, Colorado and he held that position for eight seasons, from 2000 until 2007. His coaching record at Adams State was 35–52.

== Head coaching record ==
=== College ===
| Year | Team | Overall | Conference | Standing | Bowl/playoffs |
|---|---|---|---|---|---|
Western State Mountaineers (Rocky Mountain Athletic Conference) (1996)
| 1996 | Western State | 6–5 | 6–2 | 2nd | |
| Western State: | | 6–5 | 6–2 | | |
Adams State Grizzlies (Rocky Mountain Athletic Conference) (2000–2007)
| 2000 | Adams State | 3–7 | 3–5 | T–5th | |
| 2001 | Adams State | 2–9 | 1–7 | T–8th | |
| 2002 | Adams State | 5–6 | 4–4 | T–4th | |
| 2003 | Adams State | 4–7 | 3–5 | 7th | |
| 2004 | Adams State | 7–4 | 6–2 | T–2nd | |
| 2005 | Adams State | 6–5 | 5–3 | 4th | |
| 2006 | Adams State | 6–5 | 4–4 | 4th | |
| 2007 | Adams State | 2–9 | 2–6 | 7th | |
| Adams State: | | 35–52 | 28–36 | | |
| Total: | | 41–57 | | | |
