= Henry Canine =

American football coach (1901–1939)

Biographical details
- Born: July 28, 1901; Emmetsburg, Iowa, U.S.
- Died: June 12, 1939 (aged 37); Rochester, Minnesota, U.S.
- Education: University of Idaho

Playing career

Football
- 1925–1926: Idaho

Basketball
- 1924–1926: Idaho
- Position: Halfback (football)

Coaching career (HC unless noted)

Football
- 1927–1928: Rock Island HS (IL)
- 1929–1937: Aledo HS (IL)
- 1938: Adams State

Administrative career (AD unless noted)
- 1938: Adams State

Head coaching record
- Overall: 1–4–1 (college)

Henry Edison Canine (July 28, 1901 – June 12, 1939) was an American football coach and physical education instructor. Canine received national recognition from his master's thesis, where he advocated for a lighter-weight discus in high school competition. His suggestion was adopted by the National High School Athletic Association.

Canine was the second head football coach at Adams State College—now known as Adams State University—in Alamosa, Colorado and he held that position for the 1938 season. His coaching record at Adams State was 1–4–1. He also served as athletic director during that year.

Canine played at the collegiate level at the University of Idaho. He married Mary Hagen in June 1928. He began his coaching career with Rock Island High School before he coached in Aledo, Illinois for eleven years while also teaching mathematics.

Canine died on June 12, 1939, the summer after his first year of coaching at the Mayo Clinic in Rochester, Minnesota.

== Head coaching record ==
=== College ===
Year	Team	Overall	Conference	Standing	Bowl/playoffs
Adams State Grizzlies (Independent) (1938)
1938	Adams State	1–4–1			
Adams State:		1–4–1			
Total:		1–4–1			
