= Jim Paronto =

American football player, coach, and official (born 1943)

Biographical details
- Born: April 25, 1943; Grand Junction, Colorado, U.S.
- Died: December 11, 2023 (aged 80); Grand Junction, Colorado, U.S.

Playing career

Football
- 1961: Pepperdine
- 1962–1965: Adams State
- Position: Quarterback

Coaching career (HC unless noted)

Football
- 1966: Palm Springs HS (CA) (backfield)
- 1967–1972: Monte Vista HS (CO)
- 1973–1976: Adams State (DC)
- 1977–1980: Adams State
- 1981–1982: BYU (GA)
- 1983–1984: BYU (ILB)
- 1985: Oregon State (RB)
- 1986: Oregon State (ST/RB)
- 1987–1989: Central HS (CO)
- 1990–1993: Mesa State

Baseball
- 1974–1976: Adams State

Head coaching record
- Overall: 41–43 (college football)
- Bowls: 0–1
- Tournaments: Football; 2–1 (NAIA D-I playoffs)

Accomplishments and honors

Championships
- Football; 2 RMAC (1980, 1990)

Awards
- Baseball; NAIA District Coach of the Year (1974)

James F. Paronto (April 25, 1943 – December 11, 2023) was an American baseball and football player, coach, and official. He served at the head football coach at Adams State University from 1977 to 1980 and at Mesa State College from 1990 to 1993, compiling a career college football coaching record of 41–43. He is the father of Kris Paronto.

== Playing career ==
Paronto played quarterback at Adams State, graduating in 1966 and serving as team captain in 1965. He earned accolades of Academic All-Conference, Second Team Academic All-American, and Second Team All-Conference. While at Adams State, he also played on the school's baseball team.

== Coaching career ==
Paronto was the 14th head football coach at Adams State College—now known as Adams State University—in Alamosa, Colorado and he held that position for four seasons, from 1977 until 1980. His coaching record at Adams State was 22–19. At Adams State, he was named NAIA District Coach of the Year in 1974. He later became the head coach of the Colorado Mesa Mavericks football program from 1990 to 1993. While at Mesa, his teams accumulated a record of 19 wins and 24 losses and won their conference championship in 1990.

Paronto also coached as an assistant at Brigham Young University (BYU) and Oregon State

== Sports administration and officiating ==
In July 2003, Paronto was named the coordinator of baseball umpires for the Mountain West Conference. In addition to his baseball officiating, Paronto worked in the Western Athletic Conference as a basketball official and was selected in 1982 as an alternate in a regional postseason game. He also was Secretary Rules Editor for the NCAA Baseball Rules Committee (2003–2015) and officiated baseball for over 40 years. He worked the National Junior College World Series 15 times took various on-field assignments in several conference championships.

== Personal life ==
Paronto died on December 11, 2023.

== Head coaching record ==
=== College football ===
Year	Team	Overall	Conference	Standing	Bowl/playoffs
Adams State Indians (Rocky Mountain Athletic Conference) (1977–1980)
1977	Adams State	3–7	3–6	6th	
1978	Adams State	6–4	5–3	T–2nd	
1979	Adams State	5–5	4–4	T–4th	
1980	Adams State	8–3	7–1	T–1st	
Adams State:		22–19	19–14		
Mesa State Mavericks (Rocky Mountain Athletic Conference) (1990–1993)
1990	Mesa State	8–4	4–0	1st	L NAIA Division I Championship
1991	Mesa State	3–7	3–3	T–3rd	
1992	Mesa State	3–8	3–4	5th	
1993	Mesa State	5–5	5–2	T–2nd	
Mesa State:		19–24	15–9		
Total:		41–43			
National championship Conference title Conference division title or championship game berth
