= Bill Schade =

American football coach

Coaching career (HC unless noted)
- 1974–1976: Adams State

Head coaching record
- Overall: 14–13

Bill Schade is an American former football coach. He was the 13th head football coach at Adams State College—now known as Adams State University—in Alamosa, Colorado and he held that position for three seasons, from 1974 until 1976. His coaching record at Adams State was 14–13.

== Head coaching record ==
Year	Team	Overall	Conference	Standing	Bowl/playoffs
Adams State Indians (Rocky Mountain Athletic Conference) (1974–1976)
1974	Adams State	5–4	3–3	T–2nd	
1975	Adams State	6–3	6–1	2nd	
1976	Adams State	3–6	3–6	9th	
Adams State:		14–13	12–10		
Total:		14–13			
