= Ernie Smith =

Ernie Smith may refer to:

- Ernie Smith (baseball, born 1899) (1899–1973), American baseball shortstop
- Ernie Smith (baseball, born 1908) (1908–1973), American Negro league baseball left fielder
- Ernie Smith (tackle) (1909–1985), American football player
- Ernie Smith (American football coach) (born c. 1920), American football coach in 1950s
- Ernie Smith (footballer) (1912–1996), English professional footballer
- Ernie Smith (singer) (1945–2026), Jamaican reggae singer
- Ernie Smith (politician) (1951–2021), Jamaican politician
- Ernie Smith (jazz musician) (born1971), South African guitarist, singer, songwriter and record producer

== See also ==
- Ernest Smith (disambiguation)
- List of people with surname Smith
