= Richard Ulrich (football coach) =

American football coach

Coaching career (HC unless noted)
- 1981: Adams State
- 1990–1992: Rocky Mountain

Head coaching record
- Overall: 18–20–1

Accomplishments and honors

Championships
- 2 Frontier (1991–1992)

Richard Ulrich is an American former football coach. He was the 15th head football coach at Adams State College—now known as Adams State University—in Alamosa, Colorado and he held that position for the 1981 season. His coaching record at Adams State was 3–5–1.

== Head coaching record ==
Year	Team	Overall	Conference	Standing	Bowl/playoffs
Adams State Indians (Rocky Mountain Athletic Conference) (1981)
1981	Adams State	3–5–1	3–4–1	5th	
Adams State:		3–5–1	3–4–1		
Rocky Mountain Battlin' Bears (Frontier Conference) (1990–1992)
1990	Rocky Mountain	2–8	1–5	4th	
1991	Rocky Mountain	5–5	4–2	1st	
1992	Rocky Mountain	8–2	4–2	T–1st	
Rocky Mountain:		15–15	9–9		
Total:		18–20–1			
National championship Conference title Conference division title or championship game berth
