= Richard Ulrich =

Richard Ulrich may refer to:

- Richard Ulrich (football coach) (fl. 1981–1992), American football coach
- Richard Ulrich (board game designer) (born 1942), German board game designer
