= Paronto =

Paronto is a surname. Notable people with the surname include:

- Chad Paronto (born 1975), American baseball player
- James Paronto (born 1943), American football player, coach, and official
- "Tanto" Kris Paronto (born 1971), American soldier and author
