= Adams State Grizzlies football =

College football team

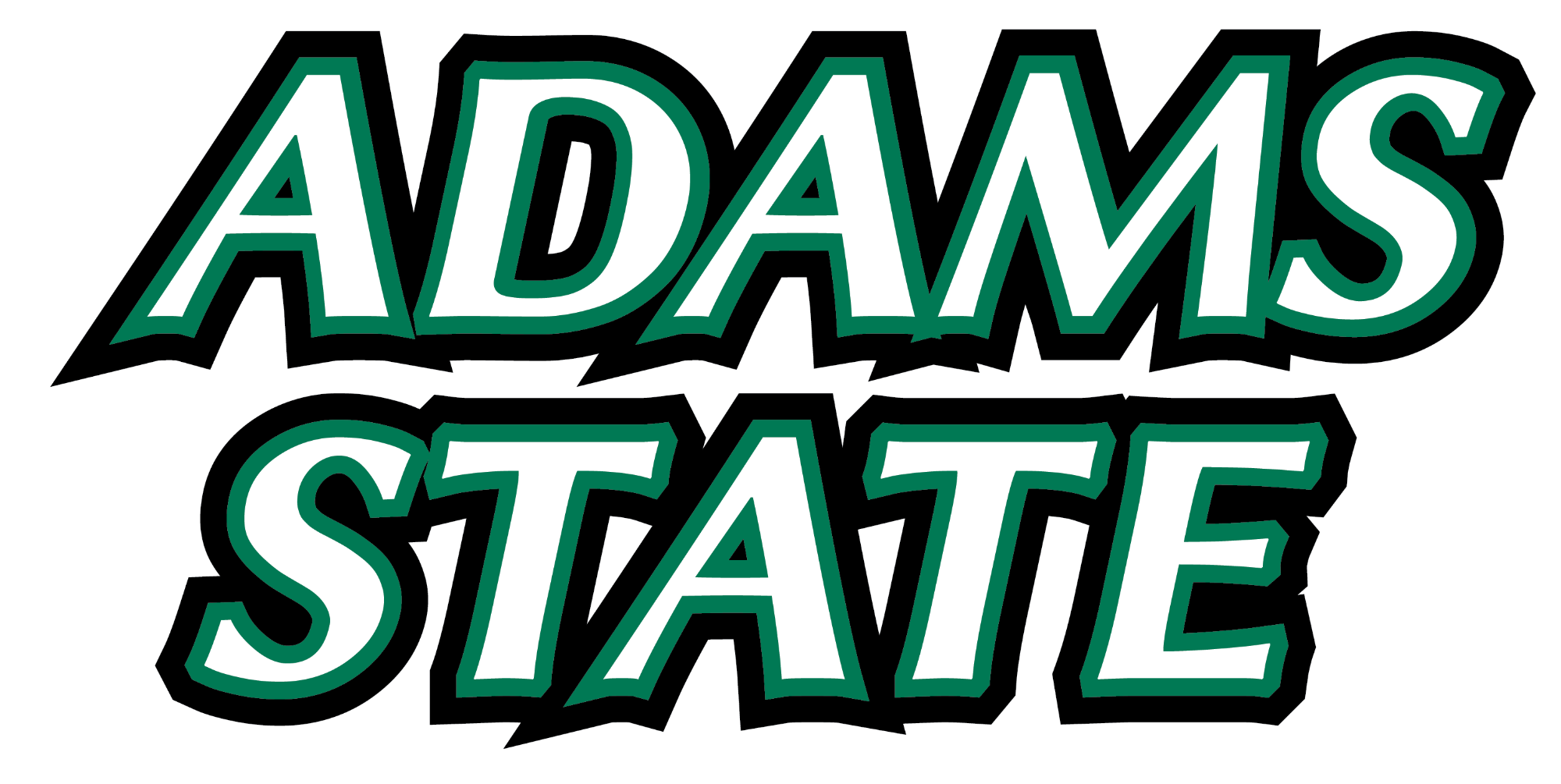
- First season: 1930; 96 years ago
- Athletic director: Katelyn Smith
- Head coach: Levi Gallas; 2nd season, 1–21 (.045)
- Location: Alamosa, Colorado
- Stadium: Rex Stadium (capacity: 1,500)
- NCAA division: Division II
- Conference: RMAC
- Colors: Green and white
- All-time record: 381–437–19 (.467)
- Bowl record: 2–0 (1.000)

Conference championships
- 8

Division championships
- 2
- Rivalries: Fort Lewis
- Mascot: Grizzly bear
- Website: asugrizzlies.com/football

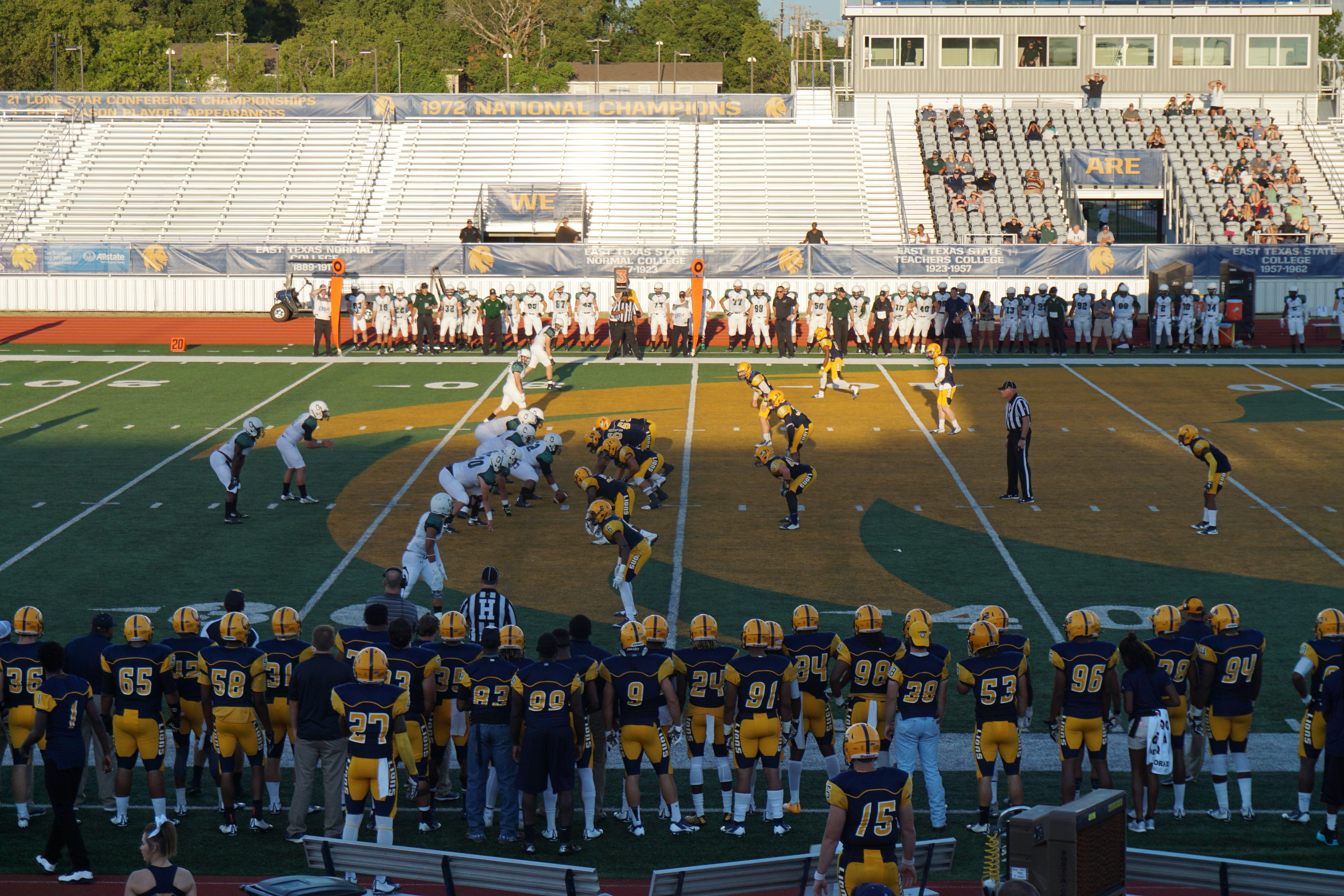
The Adams State football team in action against the Texas A&M–Commerce Lions in 2015.

The Adams State Grizzlies football team represents Adams State University in college football at the NCAA Division II level. The Grizzlies are members of the Rocky Mountain Athletic Conference (RMAC), fielding its team in the RMAC since 1957. The Grizzlies play their home games at Rex Stadium in Alamosa, Colorado. The team was formally known as the Adams State Indians.

Their current head coach is Levi Gallas, who has held the position since 2024.

== Conference affiliations ==
- Independent (1930–1945)
- New Mexico Intercollegiate Conference (1946–1955)
- Independent (1956)
- Rocky Mountain Athletic Conference (1957–present)

== List of head coaches ==
=== Key ===
Key to symbols in coaches list
General		Overall		Conference		Postseason (Note: Although the first Rose Bowl Game was played in 1902, it has been continuously played since the 1916 game, and is recognized as the oldest bowl game by the NCAA. "—" indicates any season prior to 1916 when postseason games were not played.)	
No.	Order of coaches (Note: A running total of the number of head coaches, with coaches who served separate tenures being counted only once. Interim head coaches are represented with "Int" and are not counted in the running total. "—" indicates the team played but either without a coach or no coach is on record. "X" indicates an interim year without play.)	GC	Games coached	CW	Conference wins	PW	Postseason wins
DC	Division championships	OW	Overall wins	CL	Conference losses	PL	Postseason losses
CC	Conference championships	OL	Overall losses	CT	Conference ties	PT	Postseason ties
NC	National championships	OT	Overall ties (Note: Overtime rules in college football were introduced in 1996, making ties impossible in the period since.)	C%	Conference winning percentage		
†	Elected to the College Football Hall of Fame	O%	Overall winning percentage (Note: When computing the win–loss percentage, a tie counts as half a win and half a loss.)				

=== Coaches ===
List of head football coaches showing season(s) coached, overall records, conference records, postseason records, and championships
No.	Name	Season(s)	GC	OW	OL	OT	O%	CW	CL	CT	C%	PW	PL	PT	DC	CC
1	Clifton White	1930–1937	37	12	20	5	0.392	–	–	–	–	–	–	–	–	–
2	Henry Canine	1938	6	1	4	1	0.250	–	–	–	–	–	–	–	–	–
3	Vernon Hopper	1939–1942	19	6	13	0	0.316	–	–	–	–	–	–	–	–	–
4	Neal Mehring	1946–1947	15	11	4	0	0.733	9	1	0	0.900	–	–	–	–	1
5	William C. Heiss	1948–1949	17	11	5	1	0.676	6	2	1	0.722	–	–	–	–	–
6	Orval Steffen	1950–1951	18	5	11	2	0.333	5	4	1	0.550	–	–	–	–	–
7	Michael Stimack	1952–1956	44	14	29	1	0.330	12	11	1	0.521	–	–	–	–	1
8	Ernie Smith	1957–1958	19	1	17	1	0.079	1	8	1	0.150	–	–	–	–	–
9	Darrell Mudra	1959–1962	37	32	4	1	0.878	15	1	0	0.938	1	0	0	0	3
10	Donald McKillip	1963–1967, 1969	57	39	18	0	0.684	6	4	0	0.600	1	0	0	1	0
11	Gene Carpenter	1968	9	8	1	0	0.889	–	–	–	–	–	–	–	–	–
12	Ron Harms	1970–1973	36	21	13	2	0.611	18	6	0	0.750	–	–	–	1	1
13	Bill Schade	1974–1976	27	14	13	0	0.519	12	10	0	0.545	–	–	–	–	–
14	James Paronto	1977–1980	41	22	19	0	0.537	19	14	0	0.576	–	–	–	–	1
15	Richard Ulrich	1981	9	3	5	1	0.389	3	4	1	0.438	–	–	–	–	–
16	Joel Swisher	1982–1983	19	7	10	2	0.421	7	7	2	0.500	–	–	–	–	–
17	Jeff Geiser	1984–1996	135	65	68	2	0.489	42	41	1	0.506	2	2	0	–	1
18	David Elsenrath	1997–1999	31	9	22	0	0.290	8	16	0	0.333	–	–	–	–	–
19	Wayne McGinn	2000–2007	87	35	52	0	0.402	28	36	0	0.438	–	–	–	–	–
20	Marty Heaton	2008–2014	77	42	35	0	0.545	34	29	0	0.540	–	–	–	–	–
21	Timm Rosenbach	2015–2017	32	9	23	0	0.281	9	20	0	0.310	–	–	–	–	–
22	Josh Blankenship	2018–2020	22	8	14	0	0.364	8	12	0	0.400	–	–	–	–	–
23	Jarrell Harrison	2021–2024	44	6	38	0	0.136	5	31	0	0.139	–	–	–	–	–
23	Levi Gallas	2025–present	22	1	21	0	0.045	1	17	0	0.056	–	–	–	–	–

== Year-by-year results ==
National champions	Conference champions	Bowl game berth	Playoff berth

Season	Year	Head coach	Association	Division	Conference	Record							Postseason	Final ranking
Season	Year	Head coach	Association	Division	Conference	Overall			Conference				Postseason	Final ranking
Season	Year	Head coach	Association	Division	Conference	Win	Loss	Tie	Finish	Win	Loss	Tie	Postseason	Final ranking
Adams State Indians
1930	1930	Clifton White	NCAA	—	Independent	0	1	2					—	—
1931	1931	Clifton White	NCAA	—	Independent	2	1	1					—	—
1932	1932	Clifton White	NCAA	—	Independent	1	2	1					—	—
1933	1933	Clifton White	NCAA	—	Independent	2	1	0					—	—
1934	1934	Clifton White	NCAA	—	Independent	1	3	0					—	—
1935	1935	Clifton White	NCAA	—	Independent	1	5	1					—	—
1936	1936	Clifton White	NCAA	—	Independent	3	4	0					—	—
1937	1937	Clifton White	NCAA	—	Independent	2	3	0					—	—
1938	1938	Henry Canine	NCAA	—	Independent	1	4	1					—	—
1939	1939	Vernon Hopper	NCAA	—	Independent	3	2	0					—	—
1940	1940	Vernon Hopper	NCAA	—	Independent	0	5	0					—	—
1941	1941	Vernon Hopper	NCAA	—	Independent	1	3	0					—	—
1942	1942	Vernon Hopper	NCAA	—	Independent	2	3	0					—	—
No team from 1943 to 1945
1946	1946	Neal Mehring	NCAA	—	NMIC	5	1	0	1st	4	0	0	Conference champion	—
1947	1947	Neal Mehring	NCAA	—	NMIC	6	3	0	2nd	5	1	0	—	—
1948	1948	William C. Heiss	NCAA	—	NMIC	6	2	0	2nd	3	1	0	—	—
1949	1949	William C. Heiss	NCAA	—	NMIC	5	3	1	2nd	3	1	1	—	—
1950	1950	Orval Steffen	NCAA	—	NMIC	2	5	2	3rd	2	2	1	—	—
1951	1951	Orval Steffen	NCAA	—	NMIC	3	6	0	3rd	3	2	0	—	—
1952	1952	Michael Stimack	NCAA	—	NMIC	2	5	1	T–3rd	2	5	1	—	—
1953	1953	Michael Stimack	NCAA	—	NMIC	3	6	0	T–3rd	3	3	0	—	—
1954	1954	Michael Stimack	NCAA	—	NMIC	3	6	0	2nd	3	2	0	—	—
1955	1955	Michael Stimack	NCAA	—	NMIC	6	4	0	T–1st	4	1	0	Conference co-champion	—
1956	1956	Michael Stimack	NCAA	College Division	Independent	0	8	0					—	—
1957	1957	Ernie Smith	NCAA	College Division	RMAC	0	9	1	6th	0	4	1	—	—
1958	1958	Ernie Smith	NCAA	College Division	RMAC	1	8	0	5th	1	4	0	—	—
1959	1959	Darrell Mudra	NCAA	College Division	RMAC	8	1	0	2nd	3	1	0	—	—
1960	1960	Darrell Mudra	NCAA	College Division	RMAC	7	0	1	1st	4	0	0	Conference champion	—
1961	1961	Darrell Mudra	NCAA	College Division	RMAC	8	2	0	1st	4	0	0	Conference champion	—
1962	1962	Darrell Mudra	NCAA	College Division	RMAC	9	1	0	1st	4	0	0	W Mineral Water	—
1963	1963	Donald McKillip	NCAA	College Division	RMAC	6	4	0	2nd	3	1	0	—	—
1964	1964	Donald McKillip	NCAA	College Division	RMAC	6	3	0	2nd	2	1	0	—	—
1965	1965	Donald McKillip	NCAA	College Division	RMAC	5	4	0	3rd	1	2	0	—	—
1966	1966	Donald McKillip	NCAA	College Division	RMAC	8	2	0					W Mineral Water	—
1967	1967	Donald McKillip	NCAA	College Division	RMAC	8	1	0					—	—
1968	1968	Gene Carpenter	NCAA	College Division	RMAC	8	1	0					—	—
1969	1969	Donald McKillip	NCAA	College Division	RMAC	6	4	0	1st (Mountain)	6	1	0	L Conference championship	—
1970	1970	Ron Harms	NAIA	Division I	RMAC	4	3	2	3rd (Mountain)	4	2	0	—	—
1971	1971	Ron Harms	NAIA	Division I	RMAC	5	4	0	T–1st (Mountain)	5	1	0	L Conference championship	—
1972	1972	Ron Harms	NAIA	Division I	RMAC	6	3	0	1st	5	1	0	Conference champion	—
1973	1973	Ron Harms	NAIA	Division I	RMAC	6	3	0	T–2nd	4	2	0	—	—
1974	1974	Bill Schade	NAIA	Division I	RMAC	5	4	0	T–2nd	3	3	0	—	—
1975	1975	Bill Schade	NAIA	Division I	RMAC	6	3	0	2nd	6	1	0	—	No. 15
1976	1976	Bill Schade	NAIA	Division I	RMAC	3	6	0	9th	3	6	0	—	—
1977	1977	James Paronto	NAIA	Division I	RMAC	3	7	0	6th	3	6	0	—	—
1978	1978	James Paronto	NAIA	Division I	RMAC	6	4	0	T–2nd	5	3	0	—	—
1979	1979	James Paronto	NAIA	Division I	RMAC	5	5	0	T–4th	4	4	0	—	—
1980	1980	James Paronto	NAIA	Division I	RMAC	8	3	0	T–1st	7	1	0	Conference co-champion	No. 10
1981	1981	Richard Ulrich	NAIA	Division I	RMAC	3	5	1	5th	3	4	1	—	—
1982	1982	Joel Swisher	NAIA	Division I	RMAC	3	4	2	4th	3	3	2	—	—
1983	1983	Joel Swisher	NAIA	Division I	RMAC	4	6	0	T–4th	4	4	0	—	—
1984	1984	Jeff Geiser	NAIA	Division I	RMAC	6	3	0	2nd	6	2	0	—	No. 20
1985	1985	Jeff Geiser	NAIA	Division I	RMAC	4	5	0	T–3rd	4	3	0	—	—
1986	1986	Jeff Geiser	NAIA	Division I	RMAC	2	8	0	5th	2	4	0	—	—
1987	1987	Jeff Geiser	NAIA	Division I	RMAC	5	6	0	2nd (Note: Adams State forfeited three victories including a conference win over Western New Mexico)	4	2	0	—	—
1988	1988	Jeff Geiser	NAIA	Division I	RMAC	10	3	1	2nd	3	1	1	L NAIA Semifinals	No. 16
1989	1989	Jeff Geiser	NAIA	Division I	RMAC	9	2	0	1st	7	0	0	L NAIA First Round	No. 1
1990	1990	Jeff Geiser	NAIA	Division I	RMAC	5	4	0	2nd	3	1	0	—	—
1991	1991	Jeff Geiser	NAIA	Division I	RMAC	6	4	0	6th	2	4	0	—	No. 16
1992	1992	Jeff Geiser	NCAA	Division II	RMAC	3	7	0	7th	1	6	0	—	—
1993	1993	Jeff Geiser	NCAA	Division II	RMAC	4	6	0	5th	3	4	0	—	—
1994	1994	Jeff Geiser	NCAA	Division II	RMAC	3	7	1	T–5th	2	4	1	—	—
1995	1995	Jeff Geiser	NCAA	Division II	RMAC	4	6	0	T–4th	3	4	0	—	—
1996	1996	Jeff Geiser	NCAA	Division II	RMAC	4	7	0	T–7th	2	6	0	—	—
Adams State Grizzlies
1997	1997	David Elsenrath	NCAA	Division II	RMAC	1	10	0	T–8th	1	7	0	—	—
1998	1998	David Elsenrath	NCAA	Division II	RMAC	4	6	0	6th	3	5	0	—	—
1999	1999	David Elsenrath	NCAA	Division II	RMAC	4	6	0	T–4th	4	4	0	—	—
2000	2000	Wayne McGinn	NCAA	Division II	RMAC	3	7	0	T–5th	3	5	0	—	—
2001	2001	Wayne McGinn	NCAA	Division II	RMAC	2	9	0	T–8th	1	7	0	—	—
2002	2002	Wayne McGinn	NCAA	Division II	RMAC	5	6	0	T–4th	4	4	0	—	—
2003	2003	Wayne McGinn	NCAA	Division II	RMAC	4	7	0	7th	3	5	0	—	—
2004	2004	Wayne McGinn	NCAA	Division II	RMAC	7	4	0	T–2nd	6	2	0	—	—
2005	2005	Wayne McGinn	NCAA	Division II	RMAC	6	5	0	4th	5	3	0	—	—
2006	2006	Wayne McGinn	NCAA	Division II	RMAC	6	5	0	4th	4	4	0	—	—
2007	2007	Wayne McGinn	NCAA	Division II	RMAC	2	9	0	7th	2	6	0	—	—
2008	2008	Marty Heaton	NCAA	Division II	RMAC	5	6	0	5th	5	4	0	—	—
2009	2009	Marty Heaton	NCAA	Division II	RMAC	5	6	0	T–5th	5	4	0	—	—
2010	2010	Marty Heaton	NCAA	Division II	RMAC	5	6	0	T–5th	4	5	0	—	—
2011	2011	Marty Heaton	NCAA	Division II	RMAC	7	4	0	T–4th	5	4	0	—	—
2012	2012	Marty Heaton	NCAA	Division II	RMAC	9	2	0	3rd	7	2	0	—	—
2013	2013	Marty Heaton	NCAA	Division II	RMAC	7	4	0	4th	5	4	0	—	—
2014	2014	Marty Heaton	NCAA	Division II	RMAC	4	7	0	T–6th	3	6	0	—	—
2015	2015	Timm Rosenbach	NCAA	Division II	RMAC	3	8	0	T–7th	3	6	0	—	—
2016	2016	Timm Rosenbach	NCAA	Division II	RMAC	2	8	0	10th	2	8	0	—	—
2017	2017	Timm Rosenbach	NCAA	Division II	RMAC	4	7	0	T–6th	4	6	0	—	—
2018	2018	Josh Blankenship	NCAA	Division II	RMAC	4	7	0	T–6th	4	6	0	—	—
2019	2019	Josh Blankenship	NCAA	Division II	RMAC	4	7	0	7th	4	6	0	—	—
No team in 2020 due to COVID-19
2021	2021	Jarrell Harrison	NCAA	Division II	RMAC	1	10	0	9th	1	8	0	—	—
2022	2022	Jarrell Harrison	NCAA	Division II	RMAC	2	9	0	9th	2	7	0	—	—
2023	2023	Jarrell Harrison	NCAA	Division II	RMAC	3	8	0	8th	2	7	0	—	—
2024	2024	Jarrell Harrison	NCAA	Division II	RMAC	0	11	0	10th	0	9	0	—	—
2025	2025	Levi Gallas	NCAA	Division II	RMAC	0	11	0	10th	0	9	0	—	—
