= Marty Heaton =

American football coach

Biographical details
- Born: December 11, 1959 (age 66)

Playing career
- 1978–1981: Adams State
- Position: Defensive back

Coaching career (HC unless noted)
- 2000–2005: Adams State (AHC)
- 2006–2007: Colorado Mines (AHC/DC)
- 2008–2014: Adams State
- 2016: Carroll (WI) (DB)

Head coaching record
- Overall: 42–35

Marty Heaton (born December 11, 1959) is an American former football coach. He served as the head football coach at Adams State University from 2008 to 2014, comping a record of 42–35.

Heaton played college football as a defensive back at Adams State from 1978 to 1981.

== Head coaching record ==
Year	Team	Overall	Conference	Standing	Bowl/playoffs
Adams State Grizzlies (Rocky Mountain Athletic Conference) (2008–2014)
2008	Adams State	5–6	5–4	5th	
2009	Adams State	5–6	5–4	T–5th	
2010	Adams State	5–6	4–5	T–5th	
2011	Adams State	7–4	5–4	T–4th	
2012	Adams State	9–2	7–2	3rd	
2013	Adams State	7–4	5–4	4th	
2014	Adams State	4–7	3–6	T–6th	
Adams State:		42–35	34–29		
Total:		42–35			
