= Michael Stimack =

American football coach

Biographical details
- Born: May 25, 1922; Cañon City, Colorado, U.S.
- Died: October 29, 2006 (aged 84); Santa Rosa, California, U.S.
- Education: University of Denver; Adams State College (1949); Columbia University (1950); University of California (1957); Somona State College

Playing career

Football
- 1942: Denver
- 1946–1949: Adams State

Men's basketball
- 1942: Denver
- 1946–1949: Adams State

Baseball
- 1942: Denver
- 1946–1949: Adams State
- Position: Quarterback (football)

Coaching career (HC unless noted)

Football
- 1952–1956: Adams State
- 1958–?: Montgomery HS (CA) (assistant)

Basketball
- 1952–1956: Adams State (assistant)
- 1958–?: Montgomery HS (CA)

Baseball
- 1952–1956: Adams State

Track and field
- 1958–?: Montgomery HS (CA) (assistant)

Golf
- ?: Montgomery HS (CA) (assistant)

Head coaching record
- Overall: 14–29–1 (college football)

Accomplishments and honors

Championships
- 1 NMC (1955)

John Michael Stimack (May 25, 1922 – October 29, 2006) was an American college and high school athletics coach. He was the seventh head football coach at Adams State College—now known as Adams State University—in Alamosa, Colorado, from 1952 to 1956. He played collegiately at Denver and Adams State. He was the head baseball coach for Adams State from 1952 to 1956. He was the head basketball, track and field, and golf coach for Montgomery High School.

== Head coaching record ==
=== College football ===
Year	Team	Overall	Conference	Standing	Bowl/playoffs
Adams State Indians (New Mexico Conference) (1952–1955)
1952	Adams State	2–5–1	2–5–1	T–3rd	
1953	Adams State	3–6	3–3	T–3rd	
1954	Adams State	3–6	3–2	2nd	
1955	Adams State	6–4	4–1	T–1st	
Adams State Indians (NAIA independent) (1956)
1956	Adams State	0–8			
Adams State:		14–29–1	12–11–1		
Total:		14–29–1			
National championship Conference title Conference division title or championship game berth
