= Al Garten =

American football and basketball coach

Biographical details
- Born: June 20, 1905; Kansas, U.S.
- Died: July 3, 1981 (aged 76); Watsonville, California, U.S.

Coaching career (HC unless noted)

Football
- 1936–1937: Eastern New Mexico
- 1939–1953: Eastern New Mexico

Basketball
- 1936–1938: Eastern New Mexico
- 1939–1965: Eastern New Mexico

Head coaching record
- Overall: 66–62–4 (football); 273–352 (basketball)

Accomplishments and honors

Championships
- Football; 3 NMC (1950–1952)

Alvin Davis Garten (June 20, 1905 – July 3, 1981) was an American football and basketball coach. He served two stints as the head football coach at Eastern New Mexico University in Portales, New Mexico, from 1936 to 1937 and again from 1939 to 1953, compiling a record of 66–62–4. Garten was also the head basketball coach at Eastern New Mexico for 26 seasons, tallying a mark of 273–352. The school did not field football or basketball teams from 1942 through 1944 because of World War II.

== Head coaching record ==
=== Football ===
Year	Team	Overall	Conference	Standing	Bowl/playoffs
Eastern New Mexico Greyhounds (Independent) (1936–1937)
1936	Eastern New Mexico	5–5			
1937	Eastern New Mexico	7–2–1			
Eastern New Mexico Greyhounds (Independent) (1939)
1939	Eastern New Mexico	7–3			
Eastern New Mexico Greyhounds (New Mexico Conference) (1940–1953)
1940	Eastern New Mexico	4–6			
1941	Eastern New Mexico	1–8			
1942	No team—World War II				
1943	No team—World War II				
1944	No team—World War II				
1945	Eastern New Mexico	0–6			
1946	Eastern New Mexico	1–7–1	1–3	4th	
1947	Eastern New Mexico	5–4	3–3	4th	
1948	Eastern New Mexico	6–3	5–2	3rd	
1949	Eastern New Mexico	6–4–1	4–2–1	3rd	
1950	Eastern New Mexico	5–5	5–1	1st	
1951	Eastern New Mexico	8–1	5–0	1st	
1952	Eastern New Mexico	7–1–1	4–1	T–1st	
1953	Eastern New Mexico	4–7	3–3	T–3rd	
Eastern New Mexico:		66–62–4			
Total:		66–62–4			
National championship Conference title Conference division title or championship game berth
