= 1955 Arizona State–Flagstaff Lumberjacks football team =

American college football season

1955 Arizona State–Flagstaff Lumberjacks football
- Conference: New Mexico Conference
- Record: 0–9 (0–4 NMC)
- Head coach: Earl Insley (2nd season)
- Home stadium: Skidmore Field

1955 New Mexico Conference football standings
	Conf.					Overall
Team	W		L		T	W		L		T
New Mexico Military +	4	–	1	–	0	5	–	3	–	0
Adams State +	4	–	1	–	0	6	–	4	–	0
Panhandle A&M	3	–	2	–	0	5	–	4	–	0
New Mexico Highlands	3	–	2	–	0	5	–	2	–	1
New Mexico Western	1	–	4	–	0	3	–	6	–	0
Arizona State–Flagstaff	0	–	5	–	0	0	–	9	–	0
+ – Conference co-champions

The 1955 Arizona State–Flagstaff Lumberjacks football team was an American football team that represented Arizona State College at Flagstaff (now known as Northern Arizona University) in the New Mexico Conference during the 1955 college football season. In their second and final year under head coach Earl Insley, the Lumberjacks compiled a 0–9 record (0–4 against conference opponents), finished last in the conference, and were outscored opponents by a total of 220 to 72.

The team played its home games at Skidmore Field in Flagstaff, Arizona.

== Schedule ==
Date	Opponent	Site	Result	Attendance	Source
September 24	Adams State*	Skidmore Field; Flagstaff, AZ	L 6–12		
October 1	at Whittier*	Whittier, CA	L 0–20		
October 8	Redlands*^{†}	Skidmore Field; Flagstaff, AZ	L 6–32		
October 15	La Verne*	Skidmore Field; Flagstaff, AZ	L 0–7		
October 22	at New Mexico Highlands	Las Vegas, NM	L 20–41		
October 29	at Panhandle A&M	Goodwell, OK	L 7–29		
November 5	New Mexico Western	Silver City, NM	L 12–14		
November 12	at Pepperdine*	El Camino Stadium; Torrance, CA	L 14–34		
November 26	at New Mexico Military	Roswell, NM	L 7–33		
*Non-conference game; ^{†}Homecoming
