= Renz Julian =

American rapper

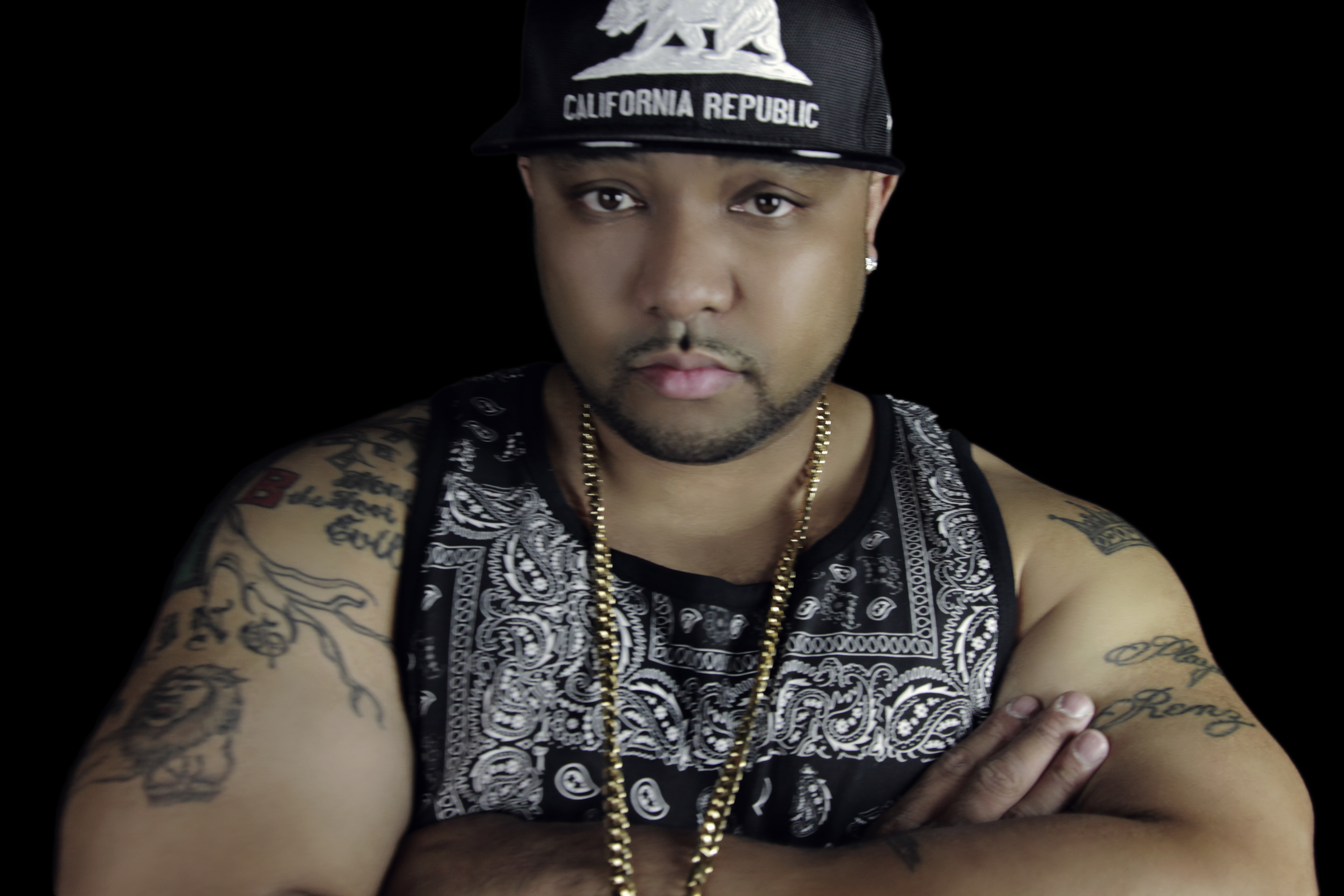

Background information
- Born: Lorenzo King; December 2, 1979 (age 46); Fremont, California
- Origin: Oakland, California
- Genres: Trap music; West Coast hip hop; G-funk; Rhythm and blues
- Occupations: Rapper, Songwriter
- Instrument: Vocals
- Years active: 2006–present
- Labels: Empire Distribution, Field Of Dreamz Entertainment
- Website: Renz Julian

Lorenzo King, best known by his stage name Renz Julian, is an American rapper, producer, and founder of Field of Dreamz Ent. Formerly known as Playa Renz, the Bay Area native originates from the cities of Oakland, Antioch, and San Jose, California. He is currently signed to Field of Dreamz Ent./Empire Distribution. He is known for his singles Clap, Clap featuring Clyde Carson, produced by Traxamillion, and Pop n' Lock remix featuring Twista, and E-40. Tom Slick, formerly of Collipark Music, produced the song. King also played college football at St. Mary's College of California, then professional arena football for the Rapid City Flying Aces of the now defunct NIFL.

King has also been a pro basketball player and team owner in the American Basketball Association, with the East Bay Kings from 2020 to the present.

== Early life and education ==
King was born in 1979 at Washington Hospital in Fremont, CA. He later would move to West Oakland, where he started his record label, Field of Dreamz Entertainment.

King graduated from California High School in San Ramon, Ca, while living with a friend and fellow rap musician Ricardo Parker. They two headed the rap group 4th Dimension, which participated in local talent shows.

King earned a football scholarship to Saint Mary’s College in Moraga, CA.

== Musical career ==
King released his first mixtape, 2 The League, in 2006.

He followed that up with the single Pop n’ Lock ft. E-40 & Twista off of his debut solo album “Armageddon.” He founded the label Field Of Dreamz Entertainment and signed a distribution deal with Empire in 2009.

In 2010, King began producing his tracks. In 2017, King signed a deal with Adler Entertainment & Dreamscape Publishing. In 2019, King released the song “The Takeaway” ft. B-Legit.

In December 2022, King collaborated with Snoop Dogg for his single “Casanova” off his current album “From A Peasant 2 A King”.

== Releases ==
- 2006: 2 The League mixed by DJ Cali
- 2007: Legal Crack mixed by DJ E-Rock
- 2008: Renz Julian EP
- 2008: Pop n' Lock ft. Twista (Single)
- 2009: Friday Night Lights ft. Big Rich & Dem Hoodstarz remix (Single)
- 2009: Fingaz of Gold
- 2009: Armageddon
- 2010: Pop n' Lock Part 2 (Single)
- 2011: From the Bay EP
- 2011: Alphabet Hustle mixed by the Demolition Men
- 2011: Day in the Life ft. J.Stalin (Single)
- 2012: Occupy the Block (Single)
- 2014-Playin’ House ft. Mister FAB (single)
- 2014-Thug Scholarship
- 2015-The Mack Julian Collection (double cd)
- 2016-Commando ft. Keak Da Sneak (single)
- 2017-Red Sonia (single)
- 2017-Promises (single)
- 2017-Renz Julian: Thug Scholarship (Documentary Film)
- 2019-Golden State Motivation (single)
- 2019-Golden State Motivation
- 2020-Thug Scholarship (deluxe version)
- 2020-CK7 (single)
- 2021-East Bay Kings (single)
- 2022-Snofall (single)
- 2022-From A Peasant 2 A King

=== Guest appearances ===
- 2007: Bay Bidness 3 mixed By DJ Whoo Kid (G-Unit) & DJ E-Rock
- 2010: Next on Deck Compilation-Various Artists
- 2011: Coast 2 Coast Mixtape 165 hosted by LEP Bogus Boys
- 2012: Coast 2 Coast Mixtape 192 hosted by N.O.R.E
- 2012: Stevie Joe Presents: Who Got Next Compilation
