= Tony Case =

American football player (born 1982)

No. 48
- Position: Long snapper

Personal information
- Born: July 10, 1982 (age 44); Jacksonville, North Carolina
- Listed height: 6 ft 2 in (1.88 m)
- Listed weight: 255 lb (116 kg)

Career information
- College: Adams State

Career history
- 2004: Buffalo Bills
- 2007: New England Patriots

Tony Case (born July 10, 1982 in Jacksonville, NC) is an American football long snapper formerly for the New England Patriots of the National Football League. Case was originally signed by the Buffalo Bills as an undrafted free agent following the 2004 NFL draft. He was released by the Bills on June 18, 2004. Before being signed by the Patriots on April 25, 2007, Case played for Rapid City Flying Aces in the National Indoor Football League, and had also been a graduate assistant for Chadron State College football team. Case attended Adams State College, where he was a four-year starter on their offensive line earning All-American accolades, he also served as the teams long snapper. He was released by the Patriots on June 8, 2007.

He was offensive line coach at Nichols College and Northern State University.
