= Ernest O. Smith =

American educator and union organizer

Ernest Ollington Smith
- Born: July 4, 1885; Selma, Alabama, US
- Died: October 13, 1945 (aged 60); Houston, Texas, US
- Resting place: Golden Gate Cemetery, Houston
- Education: Bachelor of Arts
- Alma mater: Fisk University
- Occupations: Educator, library trustee
- Spouse: Nina Erwin
- Parent: 2

Ernest Ollington Smith (1885–1945) was an American educator, library trustee, and union organizer in Houston, Texas.

== Early life ==
Ernest Ollington Smith was born July 4, 1885, to Isabella (née Glosscock) and William Dudley Smith in Selma, Alabama. His father was a carpenter who worked on construction crews building facilities at Fisk University in Nashville, Tennessee.

== Career ==
Smith graduated from Fisk University and accepted a job as a principal in Goliad, Texas. In 1905, he moved to Houston where he filled a series of principal positions at area elementary and secondary schools over several years. In 1908, he accepted the position of principal at Booker T. Washington School, where he worked until 1926.

Smith also worked summers at the docks. He joined the International Longshoremen’s Association, Local 872 after it was formed in 1913. The local tapped him to serve as its secretary, and he composed its first charter.

Smith and other African-Americans in Houston applied for and received an Andrew Carnegie grant to establish a library in Houston, which opened in April 1913. Several years previous, the Houston Carnegie Library and Lyceum barred Smith and several of his African-American colleagues from entering the facility. They responded by founding the Colored Carnegie Library to serve African-Americans, run by its own trustees and management. Though the city agreed to fund the library’s operating expenses, the funding level was much lower than that for the library established for whites. Despite the efforts of Smith and other education advocates, the city committed $4,000 per year to the first Carnegie Library compared to $500 for the Colored Carnegie Library.

== Death and legacy ==
Smith died on October 13, 1945, in Houston. He is interred at Houston’s Golden Gate Cemetery. Houston’s E. O. Smith Education Center is named for him.
