= Ernest Somers-Smith =

English cricketer

Cricket information
- Batting: Right-handed

Career statistics
Competition	First-class
Matches	2
Runs scored	33
Batting average	8.25
100s/50s	0/0
Top score	22
Catches/stumpings	0/–
- Source: Cricinfo, 8 November 2022

Ernest Somers-Smith (8 November 1895 – 2 April 1950) was an English first-class cricketer whose career spanned a single week in 1921, during which he played twice for Worcestershire. He did very little in those games, making 2 and 22 against Essex at Leyton and then 2 and 7 against Derbyshire at Worcester.

He was born in Ecclesall, Sheffield and died aged 54 in Odsal, Bradford, Yorkshire. His name was registered at both birth and death as Ernest Somers Smith with no hyphen.
