= Ernest T. Smith =

American politician (1887–1964)

Ernest T. Smith (September 12, 1887 – April 17, 1964) was an American educator and politician.

Smith was born on September 12, 1887, and raised on the family farm near Volga, Iowa. He attended school in his hometown before graduating from Upper Iowa University in 1913. He married Roberta Baskerville, an Earlville native, in June 1916. The couple moved to North Dakota, and had four children. In North Dakota, Smith worked as a school superintendent for eight years. The Smiths returned to Volga in 1923, where Ernest operated a general store for the next eight years, then moved to a farm south of town.

Smith was a Sunday school teacher and superintendent for the Methodist Church, served as secretary of the Volga School Board, was justice of the peace for Sperry Township, director of the Volga State Bank, and founding member of the Iowa State Dairy Industry Commission before winning the first of two terms on the Iowa House of Representatives in 1944. He held the District 70 seat as a Republican from January 8, 1945, to January 9, 1949.

Smith died of a heart attack at the University of Iowa Hospital on April 17, 1964.
