= Clarence Thorpe (baseball) =

American baseball player (1909–1985)

- Pitcher
- Born: November 5, 1909; Philadelphia, Pennsylvania, U.S.
- Died: July 1985; Philadelphia, Pennsylvania, U.S.

Negro league baseball debut
- 1928, for the Hilldale Club

Last appearance
- 1928, for the Hilldale Club

Teams
- Hilldale Club (1928)

Clarence E. Thorpe (November 5, 1909 – July 1985) was an American Negro league pitcher in the 1920s.

A native of Philadelphia, Pennsylvania, Thorpe attended Central High School, and played for the Hilldale Club in 1928. He died in Philadelphia in 1985 at age 75.
