= Raymond Brancheau =

American football player and coach (1909–1970)

Biographical details
- Born: October 26, 1909; Monroe, Michigan, U.S.
- Died: July 28, 1970 (aged 60); Silver City, New Mexico, U.S.

Playing career

Football
- 1931–1933: Notre Dame
- Position: Halfback

Coaching career (HC unless noted)

Football
- 1934–1948: New Mexico Teachers

Administrative career (AD unless noted)
- 1934–?: New Mexico Teachers

Head coaching record
- Overall: 47–43–7 (football)

Raymond Joseph Brancheau (October 26, 1909 – July 28, 1970) was an American college football player, coach of football, basketball, baseball, and tennis, and college athletics administrator. He served as the head football coach at New Mexico State Teachers College—now known as Western New Mexico University—from 1934 to 1948, compiling a record of 47–43–7. Brancheau also coached basketball, baseball, and tennis and served as athletic director at the school. Brancheau played college football for the Notre Dame Fighting Irish and was named Most Valuable Player for the 1933 team.

Brancheau died on July 28, 1970, at his home in Silver City, New Mexico.
