= Earl Insley =

American football player and coach (1911–1958)

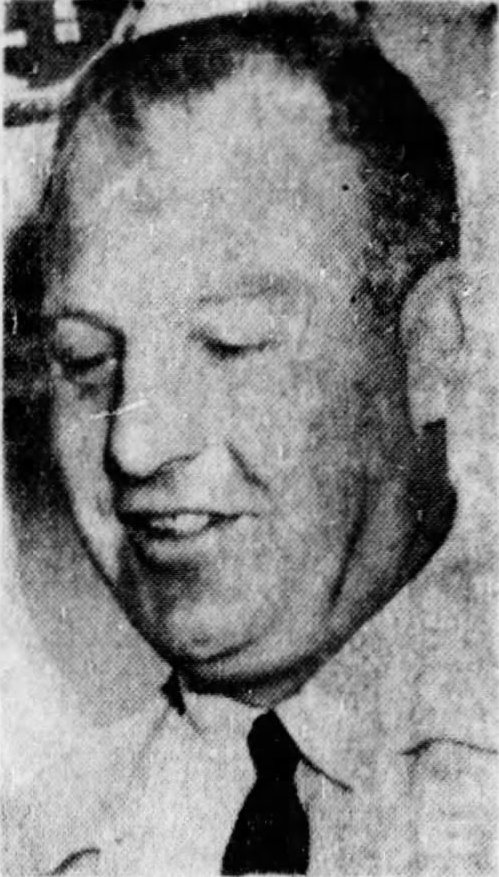

Biographical details
- Born: October 26, 1911
- Died: January 29, 1958 (aged 46) east of Show Low, Arizona, U.S.

Playing career

Football
- 1932–1933: Arizona State–Flagstaff
- Position: Halfback

Coaching career (HC unless noted)

Football
- 1934–1935: Round Valley HS (AZ)
- 1936–1939: Holbrook HS (AZ)
- 1940–1941: Arizona State–Flagstaff (freshmen)
- 1954–1955: Arizona State–Flagstaff

Administrative career (AD unless noted)
- 1949–1958: Arizona State–Flagstaff

Head coaching record
- Overall: 3–15 (college)

Earl Frank "Jiggs" Insley Jr. (October 26, 1911 – January 29, 1958) was an American football coach and college athletics administrator. He served as the head football coach at his alma mater, Arizona State College at Flagstaff—now known as Northern Arizona University—from 1954 to 1955, compiling a record of 3–15. Insley was also the athletic director at Arizona State–Flagstaff from 1949 to 1958.

Insley attended Gallup High School in Gallup, New Mexico, from which he graduated in 1930. At Arizona State–Flagstaff, he lettered in football and basketball. In 1932, he completed a pass on a fake PAT to upset the Arizona Wildcats.

Insley was killed in a car crash, on January 29, 1958, east of Show Low, Arizona.

== Head coaching record ==
=== College ===
Year	Team	Overall	Conference	Standing	Bowl/playoffs
Arizona State–Flagstaff Lumberjacks (New Mexico Conference) (1954–1955)
1954	Arizona State–Flagstaff	3–6	1–4	6th	
1955	Arizona State–Flagstaff	0–9	0–5	6th	
Arizona State–Flagstaff:		3–15	1–9		
Total:		3–15			
