= Ernest Smythe =

English cricketer and Indian Army officer

Personal information
- Full name: Ernest Meade Smythe
- Born: 25 March 1904; Ealing, Middlesex, England
- Died: 9 July 1975 (aged 71); St Columb Major, Cornwall, England

Domestic team information
- Years: Team
- 1930/31: Bengal Governor's XI
- 1928: Devon

Career statistics
Competition	First-class
Matches	1
Runs scored	7
Batting average	3.50
100s/50s	–/–
Top score	6
Balls bowled	54
Wickets	1
Bowling average	19.00
5 wickets in innings	–
10 wickets in match	–
Best bowling	1/9
Catches/stumpings	–/–
- Source: Cricinfo, 2 March 2011

Ernest Meade Smythe (25 March 1904 – 9 July 1975) was an English cricketer and Indian Army officer. His batting and bowling styles are unknown. He was born in Ealing, Middlesex and educated at Allhallows School in Devon.

Smythe played for Devon in the 1928 Minor Counties Championship, playing three matches against the Kent Second XI, the Surrey Second XI and Cornwall. In November 1930, he played his only first-class match for the Bengal Governor's XI against the Maharaj Kumar of Vizianagram's XI at Eden Gardens, Calcutta. In the Bengal first-innings he scored 1 run before being dismissed by Ghulam Mohammad and in their second-innings he scored 6 runs before being dismissed by Mushtaq Ali. With the ball he took a single wicket, that of C.R. Nayudu for the cost of 19 runs.

With the Japanese declaration of war against the British Empire during World War II, Smythe was drafted into the Indian Army as an emergency commission in February 1942, holding the rank of 2nd Lieutenant. He died in St Columb Major, Cornwall on 9 July 1975.
