= Robert G. Stevenson =

American football coach (1877–1949)

Robert Stevenson
Biographical details
- Born: August 6, 1877; Little Sturgeon, Wisconsin, U.S.
- Died: January 19, 1949 (aged 71); Williams, Arizona, U.S.
- Education: Wisconsin (AB); Arizona (LL.B.)

Coaching career (HC unless noted)
- 1923: Northern Arizona Normal

Head coaching record
- Overall: 6–1

Robert George Stevenson (August 6, 1877 – January 19, 1949) was an American college football coach. He served as the head football coach at Northern Arizona University, then known as Northern Arizona Normal School, in 1923, compiling a record of 6–1.

Stevenson died in 1949.

== Head coaching record ==
=== College football ===
Year	Team	Overall	Conference	Standing	Bowl/playoffs
Northern Arizona Lumberjacks (Independent) (1923)a
1923	Northern Arizona	6–1			
Northern Arizona:		6–1			
Total:		6–1			
