= Salida High School =

Public high school in Salida, Colorado

Location
- 26 Jones Avenue; Salida, Colorado 81201; United States; 38°31′33″N 105°59′47″W

Information
- School type: Public high school
- Established: 1910 (116 years ago)
- School district: Salida R-32-J
- CEEB code: 061250
- NCES School ID: 080633001109
- Principal: Jesse Hull
- Grades: 9–12
- Enrollment: 409 (2024-2025)
- Student to teacher ratio: 15.58
- Colors: Purple, black, white
- Athletics conference: CHSAA
- Mascot: Spartan
- Feeder schools: Salida Middle School, The Crest Academy
- Website: www.salidaschools.com/o/shs/

Salida High School (SHS) is the public high school of the city of Salida, Colorado, United States. Its colors are purple, black and white, and its mascot is the Spartan. It shares a campus with Colorado Mountain College, Salida.

The enrollment for the 2020–21 school year was 369. Just a few years previously, enrollment had stood at 400. It is the largest high school serving southern Chaffee County.

== History ==
When Salida was founded as a railroad town in 1880, the demand for public education arose. The town's first high school was built in 1891 as a temporary school. The first major high school, Salida High School, opened its doors in 1910. The campus burned in a fire in 1962.

=== New campus ===
In early 2011, plans for a new high school arose, and a bond was passed in the community with overwhelming support. In May 2011, construction crews broke ground. By July 2012, all of the old campus with the exception of the historic Kesner Building was demolished. The project was completed late summer 2012.

== Athletics ==
SHS has won over seven state championships from CHSAA sanctioned sports and events.

The school offers a variety of sports. For boys: football, golf, and soccer in fall, basketball and wrestling in the winter, and baseball and track in the spring. For girls: volleyball in the spring, basketball and swimming in the winter, and tennis, track, soccer, and golf in the spring.

SHS competes in 3A, Tri-Peaks League for most sports.

State championships
Season	Sport	Number of championships	Year
Fall	Football	5	1974, 1971, 1935, 1934, 1933
Fall	Cross country, boys'	2	2009, 2024
Fall	Soccer, boys'	1	2004
Winter	Basketball, boys'	2	1964, 1961
Spring	Track, boys'	1	1997
Total		10	

== Notable alumni ==
- Tom Hughes, former MLB player (New York Highlanders, Boston Braves)
