= Ernie Smith (outfielder) =

- Left fielder
- Born: June 3, 1908; Alexandria, Louisiana, U.S.
- Died: August 13, 1973 (aged 65); Alexandria, Louisiana, U.S.
- Batted: Left Threw: Right

Negro league baseball debut
- 1937, for the Chicago American Giants

Last appearance
- 1942, for the Chicago American Giants

Teams
- Chicago American Giants (1937-1940, 1942); Kansas City Monarchs (1938); Homestead Grays (1940)

Earnest Smith (June 3, 1908 – August 13, 1973) was an American Negro league baseball left fielder. He played from 1937 to 1942 with the Chicago American Giants, Kansas City Monarchs, and Homestead Grays.
