= Alamosa High School =

American high school in Colorado

Location
- 805 Craft Drive; Alamosa, Colorado 81101; United States
- Coordinates: 37°29′1″N 105°53′44″W

Information
- School type: Public high school
- School district: Alamosa RE-11J
- CEEB code: 060025
- NCES School ID: 080207000027
- Principal: Amy Ortega
- Teaching staff: 37.58 (on an FTE basis)
- Grades: 9–12
- Enrollment: 570 (2023–2024)
- Student to teacher ratio: 15.17
- Colors: Maroon and white
- Athletics conference: CHSAA
- Mascot: Mean Moose
- Feeder schools: Alamosa Middle School
- Website: ahs.alamosa.k12.co.us

Alamosa High School (AHS) is the public senior high school of the city of Alamosa, Colorado, United States. The school colors are maroon, white and black, and its mascot is a Mean Moose.

== Athletics ==
AHS has won over 12 state championships from CHSAA-sanctioned sports and events.

AHS competes in 3A, Intermountain, along with Bayfield High School, Centauri High School, Monte Vista High School, and Pagosa Springs High School.

State championships
Season	Sport	Number of championships	Year
Fall	Football	3	2006, 2001, 1949
Winter	Basketball, boys'	5	1992, 1991, 1990, 1989, 1939
Winter	Wrestling	10	2013, 2012, 2011, 2007, 2006, 1999, 1998, 1995, 1992, 1988
Total		18	
