= Monte Vista High School (Colorado) =

Location
- 295 East Prospect Avenue; Monte Vista, Colorado 81144; United States
- Coordinates: 37°34′57″N 106°9′18″W

Information
- School type: Public high school
- School district: Monte Vista C-8
- CEEB code: 061020
- NCES School ID: 080576001356
- Principal: Jose Ortega
- Teaching staff: 19.26 (FTE)
- Grades: 9–12
- Enrollment: 254 (2023–2024)
- Student to teacher ratio: 13.19
- Colors: Forest green and Vegas gold
- Athletics conference: CHSAA
- Mascot: Pirate
- Feeder schools: Monte Vista Middle School
- Website: mvhs.monte.k12.co.us

Monte Vista High School is located in Monte Vista, Colorado, United States, in the heart of the San Luis Valley.
