= Clarence Thorpe (American football) =

American football player and coach (1887–1959)

Biographical details
- Born: December 14, 1887; Franklin County, Iowa, U.S.
- Died: December 22, 1959 (aged 72); Ann Arbor, Michigan, U.S.
- Education: Ellsworth (IA) (1911); Michigan (Ph.D., 1925)

Playing career
- 1911: Arizona

Coaching career (HC unless noted)
- 1915–1917: Northern Arizona

Head coaching record
- Overall: 9–5

Clarence DeWitt Thorpe (December 14, 1887 – December 22, 1959) was an American football player and coach and a college faculty member. He served as the first head football coach at Northern Arizona Normal School—now known as Northern Arizona University—from 1915 to 1917, compiling a record of 9–5. During that time, Thorpe was also the head of the school's English department. Thorpe later served as a faculty member at the University of Arizona, the University of Oregon, and the University of Michigan.

== Head coaching record ==
Year	Team	Overall	Conference	Standing	Bowl/playoffs
Northern Arizona Lumberjacks (Independent) (1915–1917)
1915	Northern Arizona	2–4			
1916	Northern Arizona	5–1			
1917	Northern Arizona	2–0			
Northern Arizona:		9–5			
Total:		9–5			
