= Adams State University =

Public university in Alamosa, Colorado, U.S.

- Former names: Adams State Normal School (1921–1946); Adams State College (1946–2012)
- Motto: Great stories begin here
- Type: Public university
- Established: 1921; 105 years ago
- Academic affiliations: Space-grant
- Endowment: $23 million (2021)
- Budget: $70 million (2023)
- President: David A. Tandberg
- Students: 3,007 (fall 2024)
- Undergraduates: 1,644 (fall 2024)
- Postgraduates: 1,363 (fall 2024)
- Location: Alamosa, Colorado, United States; 37.4741464°N 105.8795210°W
- Colors: Green & white
- Nickname: Grizzlies
- Sporting affiliations: NCAA Division II – Rocky Mountain
- Mascot: Grizzly bear
- Website: www.adams.edu

Adams State University is a public university in Alamosa, Colorado, United States. The university's Adams State Grizzlies athletic teams compete in the Rocky Mountain Athletic Conference.

== History ==
Adams State was founded in 1921 as a teacher's college. Billy Adams, a Colorado legislator who would later become a three-term governor of Colorado, worked for three decades before obtaining the authorization to found Adams State Normal School in 1921, to provide higher education opportunities for teachers from remote and rural areas of Colorado, such as the San Luis Valley, and see them work in those same areas. In 1926, Harriet Dalzell Hester became the university's first graduate. She became the school's first librarian and an Alamosa County school superintendent. The school adopted the name Adams State College in 1946, corresponding with the expansion of its undergraduate and graduate programs.

In 2012, the institution's name changed again, to Adams State University.

The university gained some national attention in 2016 when its online classes came under scrutiny. The university's accreditor, the Higher Learning Commission, placed the university on probation. In 2018, the probation was lifted and the university's status was restored to "Accredited".

The university also came into the national spotlight when it placed president Beverlee McClure on leave after employees lodged complaints about her "caustic behavior". Cheryl D. Lovell was named the interim president and appointed to serve a 12-month term beginning July 1, 2018.

== Academics ==
Adams State offers bachelor's degrees in 16 different academic programs, with nearly 60 emphases, 5 teacher licensure programs, and 10 pre-professional programs, in addition to 7 master's degrees and 1 doctoral degree. Students can also earn an associate of art or science degree at Adams State.

Undergraduate demographics as of Fall 2023
Race and ethnicity	Total
Hispanic	37%
White	36%
Black	8%
Unknown	8%
Two or more races	5%
American Indian/Alaska Native	2%
Asian	1%
Native Hawaiian/Pacific Islander	1%
International student	1%
Economic diversity
Low-income (Note: The percentage of students who received an income-based federal Pell grant intended for low-income students.)	44%
Affluent (Note: The percentage of students who are a part of the American middle class at the bare minimum.)	56%

== Campus ==
Adams State Theater

Zacheis Observatory-Planetarium

Adams State University's campus is located in the heart of the San Luis Valley. All of the university's academic and residential buildings are located on its contiguous 90-acre (36 ha) campus.

=== Academic buildings ===
The main administration building and oldest building on campus is Richardson Hall, named after the school's first president, Ira Richardson. The home of the math and science curriculum, Porter Hall, is named for alumnus William A. Porter, the creator of E-Trade and a major benefactor of the school. McDaniel Hall, named for donor and emeritus faculty member John McDaniel, is the main venue for English, psychology, history, sociology, and teacher education classes.

Campus edifices for the performing arts include the Adams State University Theater (erected in 2001), the Music Building (which underwent major renovations in 2011) and the Leon Memorial Concert Hall.

=== Athletic facilities ===
There are two gyms and an indoor pool. The Rex Activity Center for student recreation includes weights, exercise bikes, rock climbing wall, and racquet ball courts. Plachy Hall includes the gym and indoor pool and field house as part of the Athletics Department.

The Rex Stadium has undergone major renovation including the addition of the Residence at the Rex. The new complex includes suites for game viewing. The new residence hall provides one of the most impressive views, with a view of Mount Blanca (one of the 14ers of Colorado) to the east and overlooking the track and football field to the west. A new $750,000 video-tron screen displays action and replays at one end of the field.

=== Residences ===
There are currently six on-campus apartment complexes (Houtchens, McCurry, Moffat, Petteys, Savage and Residence at the Rex) that include private bedrooms for two to three students, a kitchen/living room and private bath, in addition to three traditional dormitory halls (Conour, Coronado and Girault). Most entering freshmen are housed in Coronado and Girault Halls. The main cafeteria, La Mesa Dining Hall, in the Student Union Building is newly renovated.

== Athletics ==
The Adams State Grizzlies compete in the Rocky Mountain Athletic Conference (RMAC) at the NCAA Division II level. Grizzly teams compete in men's baseball, basketball, cross country, football, lacrosse, soccer, swimming, track and field, and wrestling; and women's basketball, cross country, golf, lacrosse, soccer, softball, swimming, track and field, and volleyball.

The Grizzlies have won 222 RMAC team championships and 64 team National Championships. Individually, Adams State has produced 268 national champions and 1,937 All-Americans.

The school's sports teams are now called the Grizzlies and were formerly known as the Indians.

== Notable alumni ==
- Tony Case, former professional football player
- David E. Clemmer, named to the Popular Science "10 Most Brilliant List" in 2002
- Don Cockroft, former American football punter and placekicker for the Cleveland Browns
- Robert E. DeNier, member of the Colorado House of Representatives and the Colorado Senate
- Gary W. Gallagher, historian of U. S. Civil War, professor at University of Virginia
- Nino Giarratano (born 1962), college baseball coach
- Carlos Lucero, federal judge on the United States Court of Appeals for the Tenth Circuit
- Neal Nelson, Hall of Fame Basketball Coach
- Chris Perry, former professional football player
- Pat Porter, two-time Olympian runner
- William A. Porter, co-founder of E-Trade
- Myron Thompson, Member of Parliament (1993-2008) in the Canadian House of Commons
- Donald Valdez, Colorado State Representative representing Colorado's 62nd district
- Joe Vigil, PhD, track and field coach; Olympic long-distance running coach (1998)
- Travante Williams, professional basketball player
- Anthony Drealan, track and field and cross country coach
