= Alamosa, Colorado =

Home rule city and seat of Alamosa County, Colorado, United States

- Home rule city
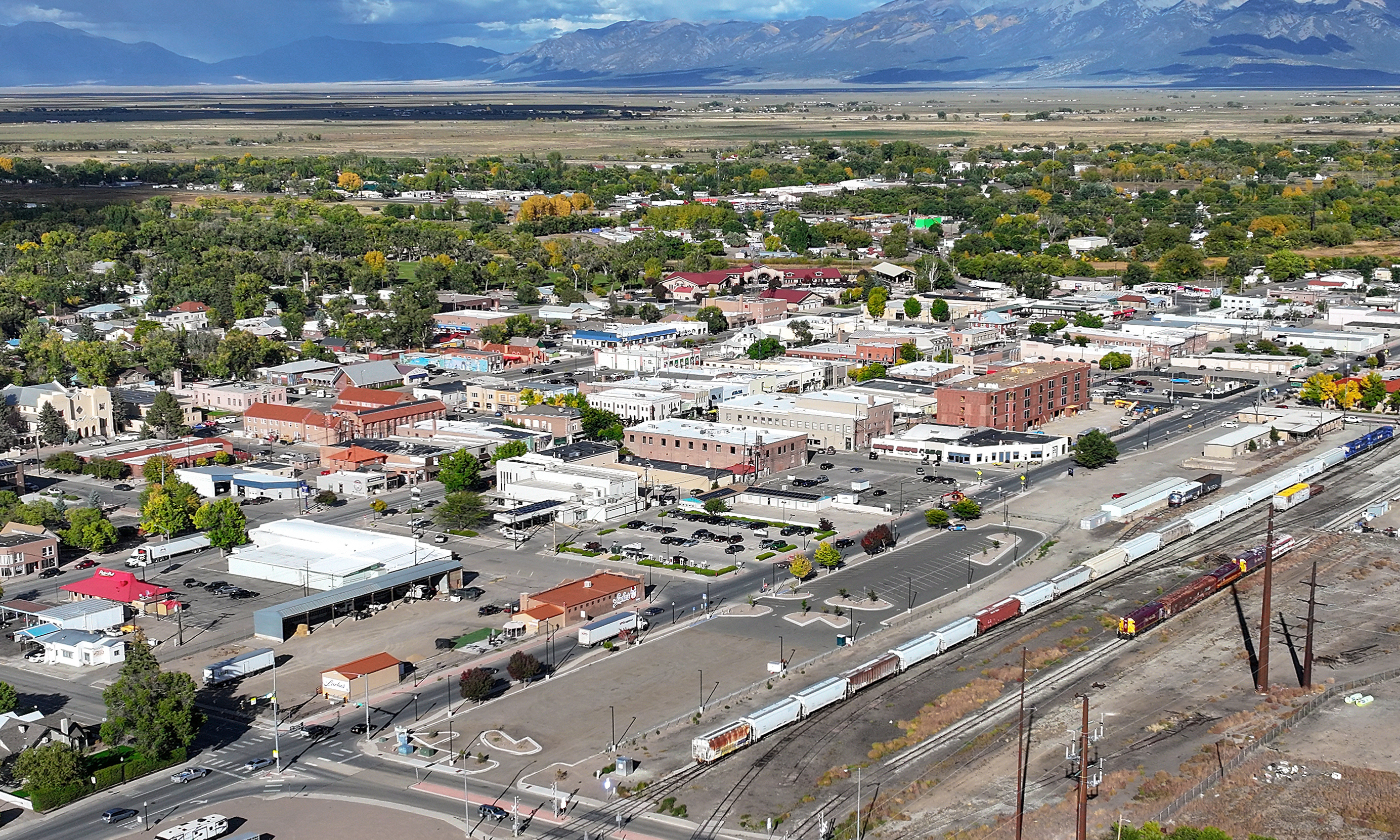
- Downtown

- Flag Logo
- Nickname: "Gateway to the Great Sand Dunes"
- Location of the City of Alamosa in Alamosa County, Colorado
- Coordinates: 37°28′34″N 105°52′40″W
- Country: United States
- State: Colorado
- County: Alamosa County seat
- Established: May 1878
- Incorporated: August 12, 1878
- Named for: The cottonwood trees along the Rio Grande

Government
  - Type: home rule city
  - Mayor: Ty Coleman

Area
  - Total: 7.97 sq mi (20.65 km^{2})
  - Land: 7.90 sq mi (20.46 km^{2})
  - Water: 0.073 sq mi (0.19 km^{2})
- Elevation: 7,543 ft (2,299 m)

Population (2020)
  - Total: 9,806
  - Density: 184.0/sq mi (71.03/km^{2})
  - Demonym: Alamosan
- Time zone: UTC−07:00 (MST)
  - Summer (DST): UTC−06:00 (MDT)
- ZIP code: 81101, 81102
- Area code: 719
- GNIS city ID: 2409673
- FIPS code: 08-01090
- Website: www.alamosa.gov

Alamosa is the home rule city that is the county seat of, and the most populous municipality in, Alamosa County, Colorado United States. Alamosa is located along the Rio Grande. The city population was 9,806 in the 2020 United States census. The city is the commercial center of the San Luis Valley in south-central Colorado, and is the home of Adams State University. Alamosa is the primary city of the Alamosa, CO Micropolitan Statistical Area.

== History ==
The Alamosa, Colorado, post office opened on March 12, 1878, and the Town of Alamosa was incorporated on August 12, 1878. The town was established by the Denver and Rio Grande Railroad and quickly became an important rail center. Alamosa was the terminus of the D&RG until 1881, when the line was extended to Monte Vista. The railroad had an extensive construction, repair, and shipping facility in Alamosa for many years and headquartered its remaining narrow-gauge service here with trackage reaching many points throughout southwest Colorado and northern New Mexico. Alamosa County was created on March 8, 1913, with Alamosa as its first and only seat.

Alamosa is now a notable tourist town with many nearby attractions, including the Great Sand Dunes National Park and Preserve, Colorado Gators Reptile Park, and the Rio Grande Scenic Railroad. The town hosts "Summer Fest on the Rio" which occurs the first weekend in June, the Early Iron car show over the Labor Day weekend, and "Weekends on the Rio" on various Sundays throughout the summer The city takes its name from the Spanish adjective Alamosa, meaning "of cottonwood", for the cottonwood forests which grow along the Rio Grande and throughout town.

== Geography ==
Alamosa is located at the junction of U.S. Routes 160 and 285. At the 2020 United States census, the city had a total area of 4,910 acres (19.871 km^{2}) including 47 acres (0.192 km^{2}) of water.

Alamosa is located along the Rio Grande in the San Luis Valley, in the highest general agricultural land in the United States. Elevation is about 7,544 feet (2,299 m) in Alamosa with peaks over 14,000 feet (4,300 m) within 23 miles (37 km) of town in the Sangre de Cristo Range.

Alamosa is the gateway city to the Great Sand Dunes National Park and Preserve.

=== Climate ===
Alamosa features a cold desert climate (Köppen BWk) with long, cold winters and warm summers, and dry weather year-round. The normal monthly mean temperature ranges from 16.3 °F (−8.7 °C) in January to 64.6 °F (18.1 °C) in July. Annual precipitation is only 7.31 inches (186 mm), with the months of July through September being the wettest. The aridity depresses normal seasonal (July through June of the following year) snowfall to 27.6 inches (70 cm).

The altitude and dryness of the air cause day–night temperature differences to be severe year-round, averaging 35.4 °F (19.7 °C) throughout the year. There was a long-term annual average of 227 days per year with a minimum of 32 °F (0 °C) or less. In the 1981–2010 period, there was an average of 46 nights with minima at or below 0 °F (−18 °C).

On July 10, 2020, Alamosa made weather history by measuring a record low temperature 37 °F (2.8 °C) and a record high temperature 92 °F (33.3 °C) in less than 12 hours.

Climate data for Alamosa, Colorado, 1991–2020 normals, (Note: Mean monthly maxima and minima (i.e. the expected highest and lowest temperature readings at any point during the year or given month) calculated based on data at said location from 1991 to 2020.) extremes 1906–present
Month	Jan	Feb	Mar	Apr	May	Jun	Jul	Aug	Sep	Oct	Nov	Dec	Year
Record high °F (°C)	63 (17)	67 (19)	83 (28)	82 (28)	90 (32)	95 (35)	96 (36)	93 (34)	89 (32)	81 (27)	71 (22)	63 (17)	96 (36)
Mean maximum °F (°C)	48.7 (9.3)	53.7 (12.1)	67.0 (19.4)	73.2 (22.9)	81.4 (27.4)	89.2 (31.8)	90.0 (32.2)	87.1 (30.6)	83.2 (28.4)	75.4 (24.1)	63.0 (17.2)	50.5 (10.3)	91.0 (32.8)
Mean daily maximum °F (°C)	34.8 (1.6)	41.2 (5.1)	52.7 (11.5)	60.2 (15.7)	69.8 (21.0)	80.2 (26.8)	83.3 (28.5)	80.5 (26.9)	74.4 (23.6)	62.8 (17.1)	48.5 (9.2)	35.4 (1.9)	60.3 (15.7)
Daily mean °F (°C)	16.8 (−8.4)	24.3 (−4.3)	35.2 (1.8)	42.6 (5.9)	51.7 (10.9)	60.6 (15.9)	65.3 (18.5)	63.2 (17.3)	55.9 (13.3)	43.8 (6.6)	30.3 (−0.9)	18.1 (−7.7)	42.3 (5.7)
Mean daily minimum °F (°C)	−1.1 (−18.4)	7.4 (−13.7)	17.6 (−8.0)	25.0 (−3.9)	33.6 (0.9)	40.9 (4.9)	47.3 (8.5)	45.8 (7.7)	37.3 (2.9)	24.8 (−4.0)	12.1 (−11.1)	0.8 (−17.3)	24.3 (−4.3)
Mean minimum °F (°C)	−17.6 (−27.6)	−11.8 (−24.3)	1.2 (−17.1)	10.9 (−11.7)	21.1 (−6.1)	30.7 (−0.7)	38.5 (3.6)	36.9 (2.7)	24.4 (−4.2)	8.2 (−13.2)	−5.0 (−20.6)	−15.0 (−26.1)	−21.6 (−29.8)
Record low °F (°C)	−50 (−46)	−35 (−37)	−18 (−28)	−6 (−21)	11 (−12)	23 (−5)	28 (−2)	29 (−2)	15 (−9)	−9 (−23)	−30 (−34)	−42 (−41)	−50 (−46)
Average precipitation inches (mm)	0.32 (8.1)	0.28 (7.1)	0.51 (13)	0.57 (14)	0.60 (15)	0.43 (11)	1.04 (26)	1.29 (33)	0.98 (25)	0.65 (17)	0.37 (9.4)	0.35 (8.9)	7.39 (187.5)
Average snowfall inches (cm)	4.5 (11)	4.0 (10)	4.3 (11)	3.6 (9.1)	0.9 (2.3)	0.0 (0.0)	0.0 (0.0)	0.0 (0.0)	0.0 (0.0)	1.9 (4.8)	3.5 (8.9)	4.7 (12)	27.4 (69.1)
Average precipitation days (≥ 0.01 in)	3.8	3.9	4.7	4.9	5.6	4.1	8.4	9.9	6.5	4.7	3.7	4.3	64.5
Average snowy days (≥ 0.1 in)	3.8	3.7	3.1	2.5	0.8	0.0	0.0	0.0	0.1	0.9	2.5	4.0	21.4
Source: NOAA

== Demographics ==
Historical population
Census	Pop.	Note	%±
1880	802		—
1890	973		21.3%
1900	1,141		17.3%
1910	3,013		164.1%
1920	3,171		5.2%
1930	5,107		61.1%
1940	5,613		9.9%
1950	5,354		−4.6%
1960	6,205		15.9%
1970	6,985		12.6%
1980	6,830		−2.2%
1990	7,579		11.0%
2000	7,960		5.0%
2010	8,780		10.3%
2020	9,806		11.7%
U.S. Decennial Census

=== 2020 census ===
As of the 2020 census, Alamosa had a population of 9,806, with 3,839 households and 1,935 families. The median age was 31.5 years. 23.3% of residents were under the age of 18 and 14.2% of residents were 65 years of age or older. For every 100 females there were 91.2 males, and for every 100 females age 18 and over there were 87.4 males age 18 and over.

98.9% of residents lived in urban areas, while 1.1% lived in rural areas.

Of the 3,839 households in Alamosa, 30.4% had children under the age of 18 living in them. Of all households, 33.9% were married-couple households, 22.5% were households with a male householder and no spouse or partner present, and 35.9% were households with a female householder and no spouse or partner present. About 37.0% of all households were made up of individuals and 12.5% had someone living alone who was 65 years of age or older.

There were 4,223 housing units, of which 9.1% were vacant. The homeowner vacancy rate was 2.0% and the rental vacancy rate was 7.5%.

Alamosa Racial Composition
Race	Num.	Perc.
White	3,834	39.1%
Black or African American	193	1.97%
Native American	151	1.54%
Asian	121	1.23%
Pacific Islander	17	0.17%
Other/Mixed	274	2.79%
Hispanic or Latino	5,216	53.19%

=== Demographic estimates ===
According to city-data.com from 2014, the population density was 1,995.0 inhabitants per square mile (770.3/km^{2}).

In the city in 2014, 21.8% of residents were from 18 to 24, 24.8% were from 25 to 44, and 18.1% were from 45 to 64.

=== Income and poverty ===
The median income for a household in the city was $29,593, and the median income for a family was $33,017. Males had a median income of $27,100 versus $22,671 for females. The per capita income for the city was $15,405. About 18.1% of families and 25.0% of the population were below the poverty line, including 30.4% of those under age 18 and 17.0% of those age 65 or over.

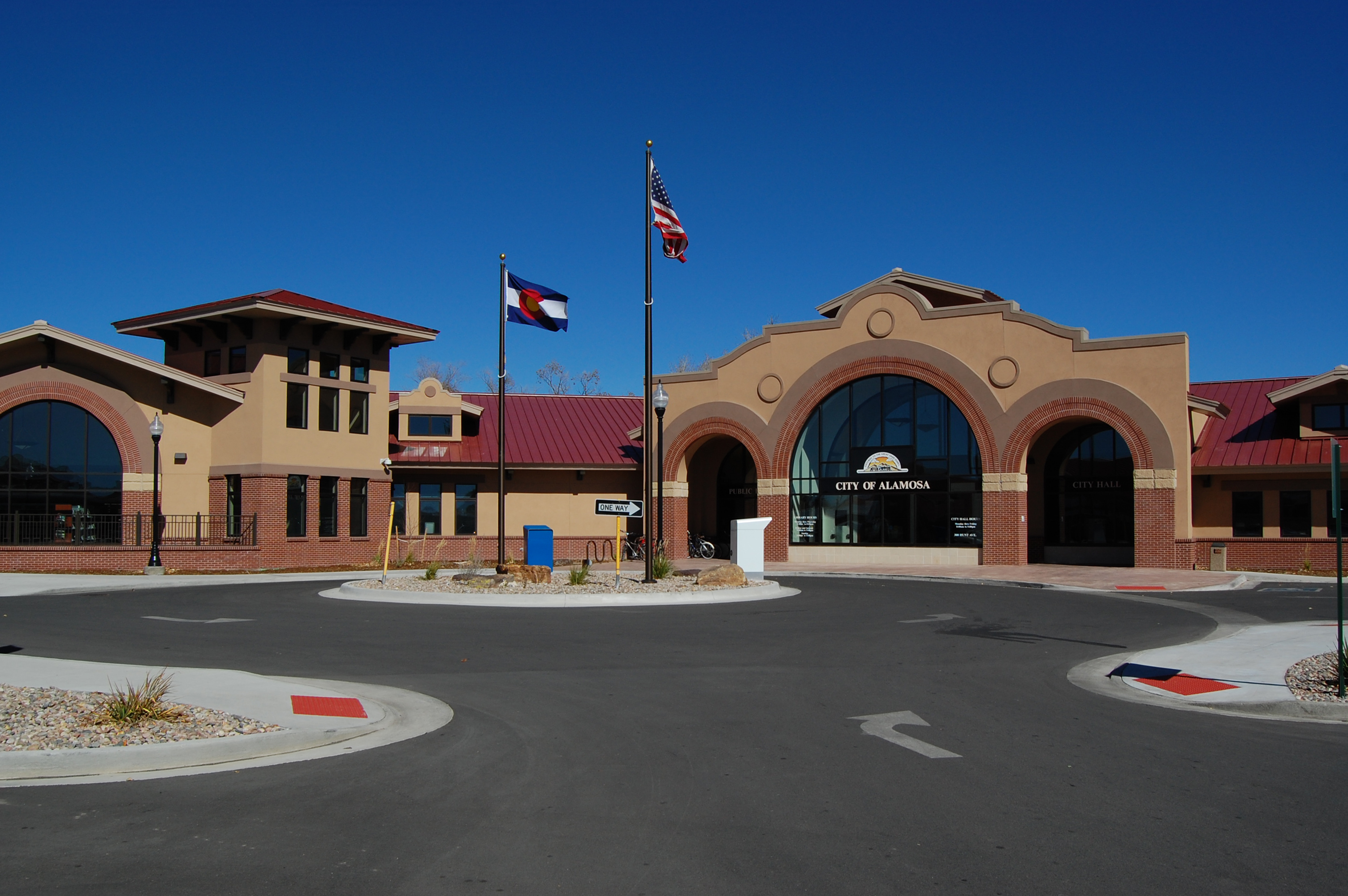
Alamosa City Hall

== Government ==
Alamosa is a home rule municipality like many other Colorado towns. The city council has six members, four elected from wards and two at large. The council has authority to make, change, and repeal laws and ordinances. The city elects a mayor-at-large on a non-partisan ballot. The current mayor of Alamosa is Ty Coleman.

== Education ==
Alamosa Public Schools are part of the Alamosa School District RE-11J, and include Alamosa Elementary School, Ortega Middle School, and Alamosa High School. Robert Alejo is the Superintendent of Schools.

Adams State University, founded in 1921 as a teacher's college, offers both undergraduate and graduate programs. Graduate level programs emphasize teaching and education, art, history and business with many of the courses available online. In 2015, the college reached an all-time high enrollment of 3,701 students. The university's location in Alamosa, with an elevation of about 7,800 ft above sea level, attracts many athletes (especially runners) to the school's athletic program. In 2014, ASU added a cycling program.

The schools in Alamosa were the subject to the educational segregation lawsuit, Maestas vs. George H. Shone.

== Infrastructure ==
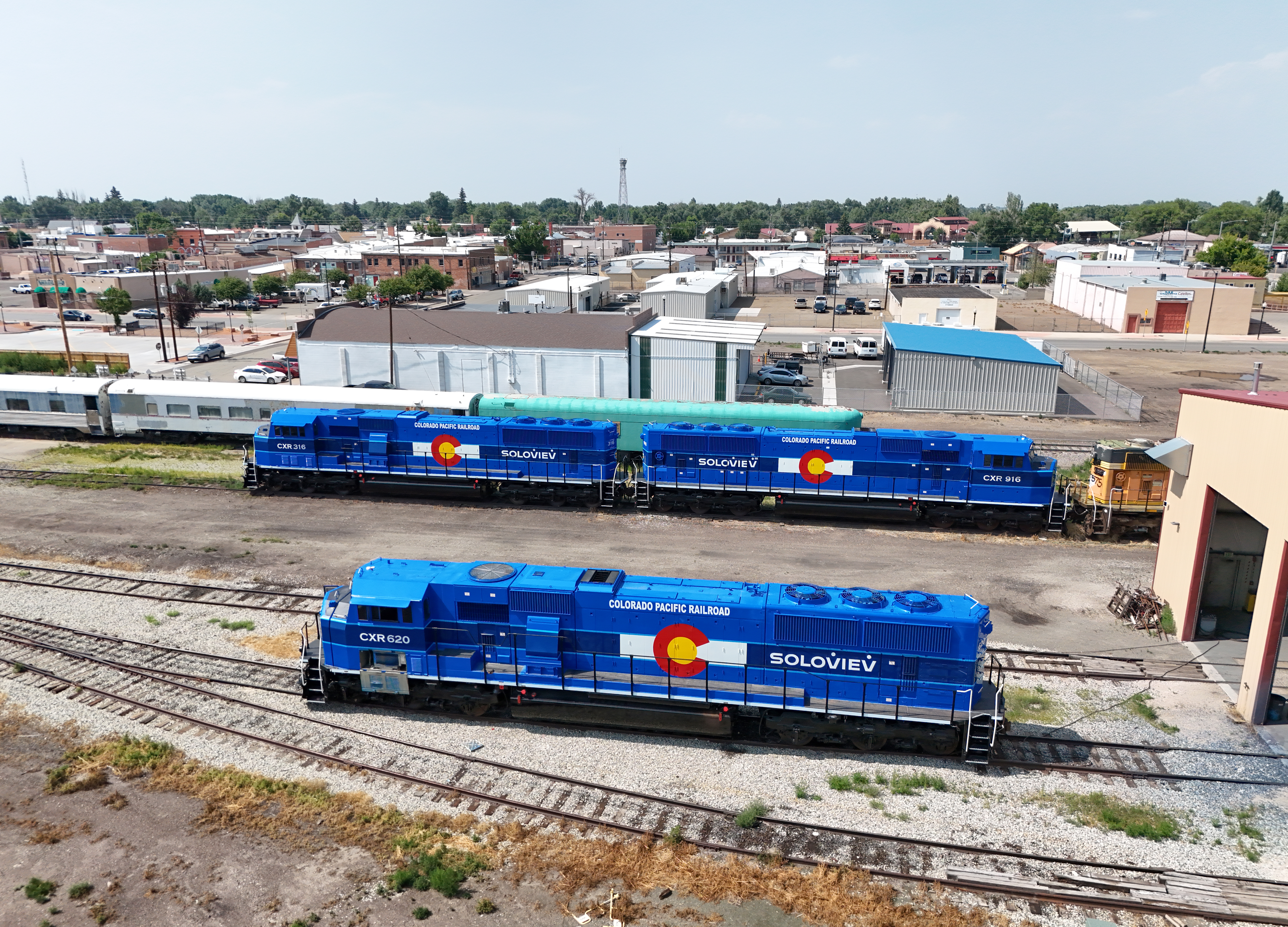
Colorado Pacific Rio Grande Railroad locomotives parked in Alamosa

=== Transportation ===
Alamosa is on the Rio Grande River, which is crossed by two auto bridges, one pedestrian bridge and one rail bridge in town. Auto traffic is served by U.S. Highway 160 running east and west and U.S. Highway 285 and State Highway 17 running north and south. Alamosa is served by the Colorado Pacific Rio Grande Railroad and Bustang. The local airport is San Luis Valley Regional Airport. Alamosa is part of Colorado's Bustang network. It is on the Alamosa-Pueblo Outrider line.

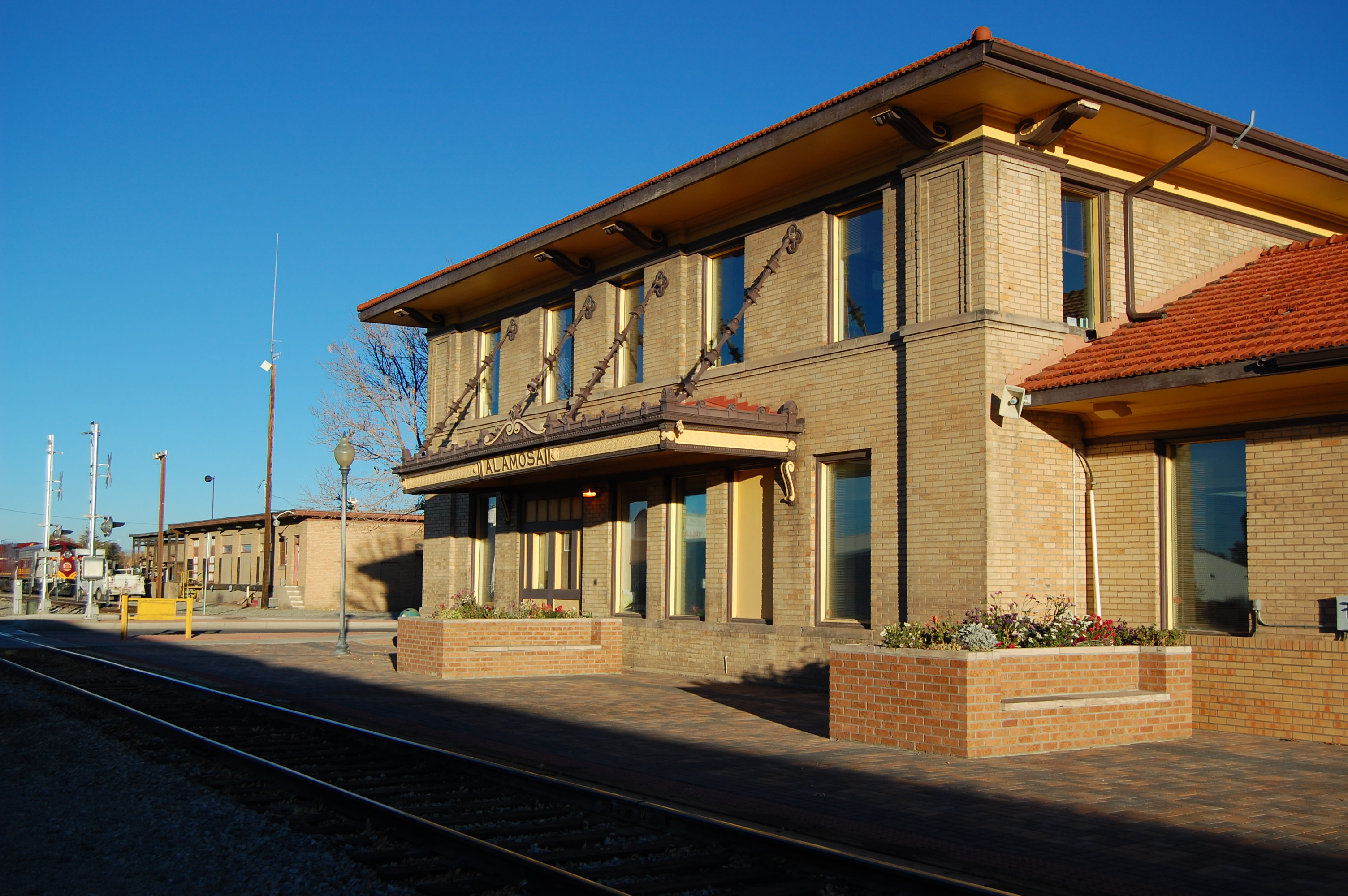
Train station in Alamosa

=== Facilities ===
Alamosa is the shopping center for the San Luis Valley and has several national and regional stores. There are a number of fast food restaurants, two medical clinics, and a regional hospital, San Luis Valley Regional Medical Center.

Adams State University is located in Alamosa. ASU is a four-year, state-supported university founded in 1921 and offering degrees in several fields including business and education.

Trinidad State College has a campus situated in Alamosa. They offer 2-year degrees in gunsmithing, aquaculture, cosmetology, welding and nursing, as well as traditional arts and sciences classes like English, physics and chemistry.

== Notable people ==
- Billy Adams (1861–1954) — mayor of Alamosa, governor of Colorado from 1927 to 1933
- Garrey Carruthers (1939–) — governor of New Mexico from 1987 to 1991
- Camille Herron (1981–) — professional ultramarathon runner and World Record holder
- Michael Johnson (1944–2017) — singer, guitarist, recording artist
- Danny Ledonne (1982–) — film director and former video game developer.
- Carlos F. Lucero (1940–) — judge, U.S. District Court of Appeals, 10th Circuit
- Alice Ivers Tubbs (1851–1930) — frontier gambler known as "Poker Alice"

== See also ==
- Alamosa, CO Micropolitan Statistical Area
- San Luis Valley
