= 1960 Arizona State–Flagstaff Lumberjacks football team =

American college football season

1960 Arizona State–Flagstaff Lumberjacks football

Frontier co-champion
- Conference: Frontier Conference
- Record: 6–3–2 (2–0–1 Frontier)
- Head coach: Max Spilsbury (5th season)
- Home stadium: Lumberjack Stadium

1960 Frontier Conference football standings
	Conf.					Overall
Team	W		L		T	W		L		T
New Mexico Highlands +	2	–	0	–	1	6	–	2	–	1
Arizona State–Flagstaff +	2	–	0	–	1	6	–	3	–	2
Panhandle A&M	1	–	2	–	0	4	–	6	–	0
New Mexico Western	0	–	3	–	0	1	–	7	–	0
+ – Conference co-champions

The 1960 Arizona State–Flagstaff Lumberjacks football team was an American football team that represented Arizona State College at Flagstaff (now known as Northern Arizona University) in the Frontier Conference during the 1960 NAIA football season. In their fifth year under head coach Max Spilsbury, the Lumberjacks compiled a 6–3–2 record (2–0–1 against conference opponents), tied for the Frontier Conference championship, and outscored opponents by a total of 260 to 176.

The team played its home games at Lumberjack Stadium in Flagstaff, Arizona.

== Schedule ==
Date	Opponent	Site	Result	Attendance	Source
September 17	China Lake Naval Ordnance Depot	Lumberjack Stadium; Flagstaff, AZ	W 61–2	3,400	
September 24	at Idaho State	Spud Bowl; Pocatello, ID	L 10–30	3,000–4,500	
October 1	at Redlands*	UR Stadium; Redlands, CA	W 20–6	3,700	
October 8	Western State (CO)^{†}	Lumberjack Stadium; Flagstaff, AZ	W 38–0	4,000–4,500	
October 15	New Mexico Highlands	Lumberjacks Stadium; Flagstaff, AZ	T 7–7	2,000	
October 22	Panhandle A&M	Lumberjacks Stadium; Flagstaff, AZ	W 14–13	4,100–4,500	
October 29	at New Mexico Western	Silver City, NM	W 34–26	8,000	
November 5	at Cal Poly Pomona	Kellogg Field; Pomona, CA	L 14–18	1,500–2,000	
November 12	at National University (Mexico)	Mexico City, Mexico	W 31–0		
November 19	at Eastern New Mexico	Portales, NM	L 14–34		
November 26	at San Diego	San Diego, CA	T 14–14		
*Non-conference game; ^{†}Homecoming
