= 1961 Arizona State–Flagstaff Lumberjacks football team =

American college football season

1961 Arizona State–Flagstaff Lumberjacks football

Frontier champion
- Conference: Frontier Conference
- Record: 3–5–1 (1–0–1 Frontier)
- Head coach: Max Spilsbury (6th season)
- Home stadium: Lumberjack Stadium

1961 Frontier Conference football standings
	Conf.					Overall
Team	W		L		T	W		L		T
Arizona State–Flagstaff $	1	–	0	–	1	3	–	5	–	1
New Mexico Western	1	–	1	–	0	4	–	5	–	0
New Mexico Highlands	0	–	1	–	1	3	–	3	–	1
$ – Conference champion

The 1961 Arizona State–Flagstaff Lumberjacks football team was an American football team that represented Arizona State College at Flagstaff (now known as Northern Arizona University) in the Frontier Conference during the 1961 college football season. In their sixth year under head coach Max Spilsbury, the Lumberjacks compiled a 3–5–1 record (1–0–1 against conference opponents), tied for the Frontier Conference championship, and were outscored by a total of 230 to 136.

Senior fullback Boyd Hall led the team with 570 rushing yards, 648 yards of total offense, and 37 points scored (six touchdowns and an extra point).

The team played its home games at Lumberjack Stadium in Flagstaff, Arizona.

== Schedule ==
Date	Time	Opponent	Site	Result	Attendance	Source
September 16		at New Mexico State*	Memorial Stadium; Las Cruces, NM	L 6–56	8,000–8,150	
September 23		at Adams State*	Rex Field; Alamosa, CO	L 6–14	4,700	
September 30		Redlands*	Lumberjack Stadium; Flagstaff, AZ	W 13–10	3,500–4,450	
October 7		Idaho State^{†}*	Lumberjack Stadium; Flagstaff, AZ	L 0–27	4,500	
October 14		at New Mexico Highlands	Las Vegas, NM	T 21–21	5,000	
October 21	9:00 p..m.	at Santa Clara*	San Jose City College Field; San Jose, CA	L 10–20	4,800	
October 28		New Mexico Western	Lumberjack Stadium; Flagstaff, AZ	W 35–13	3,600–4,000	
November 4		Cal Poly Pomona*	Lumberjack Stadium; Flagstaff, AZ	L 12–55	2,500–3,000	
November 18		Eastern New Mexico*	Lumberjack Stadium; Flagstaff, AZ	W 33–14	2,450	
*Non-conference game; ^{†}Homecoming; All times are in Mountain time

== Statistics ==
The Lumberjacks gained 2,647 yards of total offense (294.1 per game), consisting of 2,196 rushing yards (244.0 per game) and 451 passing yards (50.1 per game). On defense, they gave up 2,595 yards (288.3 per game) including 1,646 rushing yards (182.9 per game) and 949 passing games (105.4 per game).

Fullback Boyd Hall led the team in rushing, total offense, and scoring. He tallied 570 rushing yards on 130 carries, an average of 4.38 yard per carry. He also completed eight of eight passes for 78 passing yards bringing his total offense to 648 yards. He scored 37 points on six touchdowns and one extra-point kick.

Junior quarterback Jerry Steele completed 34 of 71 passes for 348 yards with three touchdowns and six interceptions.

Ed Miner was the leading receiver with 12 receptions for 91 yards.

Other notable contributors included Bob Gradillas (388 rushing yards, 73 carries; 32 receiving yards, five receptions), Jim Eis (376 rushing yards, 70 carries), Art Whitmore (238 rushing yards, 38 carries), Jim Sims (196 yards, 31 carries), David Estrada and 181 yards (26 carries).

== Coaches ==
- Head coach: Max Spilsbury
- Assistant coaches: Ted Sorich (backfield), Don Ettinger
