= 1962 NAIA football season =

American college football season

- Regular season: August–December 1962
- Postseason: November 24–December 8, 1962
- National Championship: Hughes Stadium; Sacramento, CA
- Champion: Central State (OK)

The 1962 NAIA football season was the seventh season of college football sponsored by the NAIA. The season was played from August to December 1962, culminating in the seventh annual NAIA Football National Championship, played this year at Hughes Stadium in Sacramento, California. During its three years in Sacramento, the game was called the Camellia Bowl (separate from the later Camellia Bowl contested in Montgomery, Alabama).

Central State defeated Lenoir Rhyne in the championship game, 28–13, to win their first NAIA national title.

== Conference standings ==
1962 Arkansas Intercollegiate Conference football standings
	Conf.					Overall
Team	W		L		T	W		L		T
Arkansas State Teachers $	7	–	0	–	0	8	–	2	–	0
Arkansas Tech	6	–	1	–	0	8	–	1	–	1
Henderson State	3	–	2	–	1	0	–	3	–	5
Harding	4	–	3	–	0	6	–	3	–	0
Arkansas A&M	2	–	4	–	1	3	–	6	–	1
Ouachita Baptist	2	–	4	–	0	4	–	5	–	0
Southern Arkansas	2	–	5	–	0	2	–	7	–	0
Ozarks	0	–	7	–	0	1	–	7	–	0
$ – Conference champion

1962 Carolinas Conference football standings
	Conf.					Overall
Team	W		L		T	W		L		T
No. 3 Lenoir Rhyne $^	6	–	0	–	0	11	–	1	–	0
Elon	4	–	2	–	0	7	–	3	–	0
Appalachian State	2	–	1	–	2	4	–	4	–	2
Newberry	3	–	2	–	0	6	–	5	–	0
Western Carolina	1	–	4	–	1	3	–	5	–	1
Catawba	1	–	4	–	1	3	–	6	–	1
Guilford	1	–	5	–	0	2	–	7	–	0
$ – Conference champion; ^ – NAIA playoff participant; Rankings from NAIA poll

1962 Central Intercollegiate Conference football standings
	Conf.					Overall
Team	W		L		T	W		L		T
Omaha $	4	–	0	–	1	8	–	1	–	1
Fort Hays State	3	–	1	–	1	6	–	2	–	1
Pittsburg State	3	–	2	–	0	6	–	3	–	0
Washburn	2	–	3	–	0	4	–	5	–	0
Emporia State	2	–	3	–	0	3	–	5	–	1
St. Benedict's	0	–	5	–	0	0	–	7	–	1
$ – Conference champion

1962 College Conference of Illinois football standings
	Conf.					Overall
Team	W		L		T	W		L		T
Carthage $	7	–	0	–	0	8	–	0	–	0
Carroll (WI)	5	–	2	–	0	6	–	2	–	0
Augustana (IL)	4	–	3	–	0	5	–	4	–	0
Millikin	4	–	3	–	0	4	–	4	–	0
Illinois Wesleyan	4	–	3	–	0	4	–	5	–	0
North Central (IL)	3	–	4	–	0	4	–	5	–	0
North Park	1	–	6	–	0	2	–	6	–	0
Lake Forest	0	–	7	–	0	0	–	7	–	0
$ – Conference champion

1962 Evergreen Conference football standings
	Conf.					Overall
Team	W		L		T	W		L		T
Whitworth $	6	–	1	–	0	6	–	3	–	0
Puget Sound	5	–	1	–	1	6	–	2	–	1
Central Washington	3	–	3	–	1	4	–	4	–	1
Western Washington	3	–	3	–	1	4	–	4	–	1
Pacific Lutheran	1	–	4	–	2	2	–	5	–	2
Eastern Washington	0	–	6	–	1	0	–	8	–	1
$ – Conference champion

1962 Frontier Conference football standings
	Conf.					Overall
Team	W		L		T	W		L		T
Arizona State–Flagstaff $	2	–	0	–	0	6	–	4	–	0
New Mexico Highlands	1	–	1	–	0	4	–	5	–	0
New Mexico Western	0	–	2	–	0	2	–	7	–	0
$ – Conference champion

1962 Gateway Conference football standings
	Conf.					Overall
Team	W		L		T	W		L		T
Milton +	3	–	1	–	0	5	–	1	–	0
Lakeland +	3	–	1	–	0	5	–	3	–	0
Illinois–Chicago	2	–	1	–	0	4	–	2	–	2
Northwestern (WI)	1	–	2	–	0	?	–	?	–	?
Eureka	0	–	4	–	0	1	–	6	–	0
+ – Conference co-champions

1962 Interstate Intercollegiate Athletic Conference football standings
	Conf.					Overall
Team	W		L		T	W		L		T
Central Michigan $	4	–	0	–	0	6	–	4	–	0
No. 9 Northern Illinois	3	–	1	–	0	8	–	2	–	0
Western Illinois	2	–	2	–	0	5	–	3	–	0
Illinois State Normal	1	–	3	–	0	5	–	4	–	0
Eastern Illinois	0	–	4	–	0	1	–	7	–	0
$ – Conference champion; Rankings from NAIA poll

1962 Iowa Conference football standings
	Conf.					Overall
Team	W		L		T	W		L		T
No. 10 Parsons $	9	–	0	–	0	9	–	0	–	0
Central (IA)	7	–	2	–	0	7	–	2	–	0
Luther	6	–	2	–	1	6	–	2	–	1
Upper Iowa	6	–	3	–	0	6	–	3	–	0
William Penn	5	–	3	–	1	5	–	3	–	1
Wartburg	5	–	4	–	0	5	–	4	–	0
Buena Vista	3	–	6	–	0	3	–	6	–	0
Dubuque	2	–	7	–	0	2	–	7	–	0
Iowa Wesleyan	1	–	8	–	0	1	–	8	–	0
Simpson (IA)	0	–	9	–	0	0	–	9	–	0
$ – Conference champion; Rankings from NAIA poll

1962 Kansas Collegiate Athletic Conference football standings
	Conf.					Overall
Team	W		L		T	W		L		T
No. 5 College of Emporia $^	9	–	0	–	0	10	–	1	–	0
Baker	8	–	1	–	0	8	–	1	–	0
Ottawa	7	–	2	–	0	8	–	2	–	0
Southwestern (KS)	5	–	4	–	0	5	–	5	–	0
Bethel (KS)	4	–	4	–	1	4	–	4	–	1
Bethany (KS)	4	–	5	–	0	4	–	5	–	0
McPherson	3	–	6	–	0	3	–	6	–	0
Friends	1	–	7	–	1	1	–	7	–	1
Kansas Wesleyan	1	–	7	–	1	1	–	7	–	1
Sterling	1	–	7	–	1	1	–	7	–	1
$ – Conference champion; ^ – NAIA playoff participant; Rankings from NAIA poll

1962 Mid-Ohio Conference football standings
	Conf.					Overall
Team	W		L		T	W		L		T
Bluffton +	2	–	1	–	0	5	–	3	–	0
Defiance +	2	–	1	–	0	5	–	3	–	0
Ashland +	2	–	1	–	0	4	–	4	–	1
Wilmington (OH)	0	–	3	–	0	2	–	6	–	0
+ – Conference co-champions

1962 Midwest Conference football standings
	Conf.					Overall
Team	W		L		T	W		L		T
Grinnell $	7	–	0	–	1	7	–	0	–	1
Ripon	6	–	1	–	1	6	–	1	–	1
Lawrence	6	–	2	–	0	6	–	2	–	0
Coe	5	–	2	–	1	5	–	2	–	1
St. Olaf	5	–	2	–	1	5	–	2	–	1
Carleton	4	–	4	–	0	4	–	4	–	0
Cornell (IA)	2	–	6	–	0	2	–	6	–	0
Monmouth (IL)	2	–	6	–	0	2	–	6	–	0
Beloit	1	–	7	–	0	1	–	7	–	0
Knox	0	–	8	–	0	0	–	8	–	0
$ – Conference champion

1962 Minnesota Intercollegiate Athletic Conference football standings
	Conf.					Overall
Team	W		L		T	W		L		T
No. 7 Saint John's (MN) $	7	–	0	–	0	9	–	0	–	0
Minnesota–Duluth	5	–	1	–	1	6	–	2	–	1
St. Thomas (MN)	5	–	2	–	0	6	–	3	–	0
Concordia (MN)	3	–	3	–	1	5	–	3	–	1
Macalester	3	–	4	–	0	3	–	5	–	0
Augsburg	2	–	5	–	0	3	–	5	–	0
Gustavus Adolphus	2	–	5	–	0	2	–	6	–	0
Hamline	0	–	7	–	0	2	–	7	–	0
$ – Conference champion; Rankings from NAIA poll

1962 Missouri College Athletic Union football standings
	Conf.					Overall
Team	W		L		T	W		L		T
William Jewell $	4	–	0	–	0	9	–	1	–	0
Missouri Valley	3	–	1	–	0	6	–	3	–	0
Tarkio	3	–	2	–	0	4	–	4	–	0
Graceland	2	–	3	–	0	4	–	5	–	0
Central Methodist	1	–	2	–	0	2	–	5	–	0
Culver–Stockton	0	–	5	–	0	1	–	8	–	0
$ – Conference champion

1962 Montana Collegiate Conference football standings
	Conf.					Overall
Team	W		L		T	W		L		T
Western Montana $	5	–	0	–	0	6	–	1	–	0
Eastern Montana	4	–	1	–	0	5	–	2	–	0
Carroll (MT)	3	–	2	–	0	4	–	2	–	0
Rocky Mountain	2	–	3	–	0	2	–	5	–	0
Montana Mines	1	–	4	–	0	?	–	?	–	?
Northern Montana	0	–	5	–	0	0	–	7	–	0
$ – Conference champion

1962 Nebraska College Conference football standings
	Conf.					Overall
Team	W		L		T	W		L		T
Kearney State $	4	–	0	–	1	6	–	1	–	1
Peru State	2	–	1	–	2	5	–	2	–	2
Wayne State (NE)	3	–	2	–	0	5	–	3	–	0
Hastings	2	–	2	–	1	5	–	2	–	1
Doane	1	–	4	–	0	2	–	5	–	1
Chadron State	1	–	4	–	0	2	–	7	–	0
$ – Conference champion

1962 North Dakota Intercollegiate Conference football standings
	Conf.					Overall
Team	W		L		T	W		L		T
Minot State +	5	–	1	–	0	6	–	2	–	0
Wahpeton Science +	5	–	1	–	0	6	–	2	–	0
Mayville State	4	–	2	–	0	6	–	2	–	0
Valley City State	4	–	2	–	0	4	–	4	–	0
Dickinson State	2	–	4	–	0	2	–	5	–	0
Jamestown	1	–	5	–	0	1	–	7	–	0
Ellendale	0	–	6	–	0	1	–	7	–	0
$ – Conference champion

1962 Northern State College Conference football standings
	Conf.					Overall
Team	W		L		T	W		L		T
Winona State $	5	–	0	–	0	6	–	1	–	1
Mankato State	3	–	2	–	0	4	–	4	–	0
St. Cloud State	2	–	2	–	1	5	–	3	–	1
Moorhead State	2	–	3	–	0	5	–	4	–	0
Bemidji State	2	–	3	–	0	3	–	6	–	0
Michigan Tech	0	–	4	–	1	0	–	6	–	1
$ – Conference champion

1962 Northwest Conference football standings
	Conf.					Overall
Team	W		L		T	W		L		T
No. 8 Linfield $	5	–	0	–	0	8	–	0	–	1
Lewis & Clark	3	–	1	–	1	7	–	1	–	1
Willamette	3	–	1	–	1	6	–	3	–	1
College of Idaho	2	–	3	–	0	5	–	4	–	0
Pacific (OR)	1	–	4	–	0	1	–	8	–	0
Whitman	0	–	5	–	0	1	–	7	–	0
$ – Conference champion; Rankings from NAIA poll

1962 Oklahoma Collegiate Conference football standings
	Conf.					Overall
Team	W		L		T	W		L		T
No. 1 Central State (OK) $^	7	–	0	–	0	11	–	0	–	0
East Central	6	–	1	–	0	9	–	3	–	0
SW Oklahoma State	5	–	2	–	0	6	–	4	–	0
Northeastern State	3	–	4	–	0	4	–	5	–	0
Panhandle A&M	2	–	4	–	1	3	–	6	–	1
SE Oklahoma State	1	–	4	–	2	3	–	5	–	2
Langston	1	–	5	–	1	1	–	6	–	1
NW Oklahoma State	1	–	6	–	0	2	–	7	–	0
$ – Conference champion; ^ – NAIA playoff participant; Rankings from NAIA poll

1962 Oregon Collegiate Conference football standings
	Conf.					Overall
Team	W		L		T	W		L		T
Southern Oregon $	4	–	0	–	0	8	–	1	–	0
Portland State	3	–	1	–	0	4	–	4	–	0
Oregon College	2	–	2	–	0	4	–	4	–	0
Oregon Tech	1	–	3	–	0	2	–	6	–	0
Eastern Oregon	0	–	4	–	0	1	–	8	–	0
$ – Conference champion

1962 Pennsylvania State College Conference football standings
	Conf.					Overall
Team	W		L		T	W		L		T
East Division
East Stroudsburg xy	6	–	0	–	0	8	–	1	–	0
West Chester	5	–	1	–	0	7	–	2	–	0
Kutztown	3	–	3	–	0	5	–	3	–	0
Bloomsburg	3	–	3	–	0	4	–	4	–	1
Mansfield	2	–	4	–	0	2	–	5	–	0
Millersville	2	–	4	–	0	2	–	6	–	0
Cheyney	0	–	6	–	0	1	–	6	–	0
West Division
Slippery Rock xy$	5	–	1	–	0	9	–	1	–	0
California (PA)	4	–	1	–	1	5	–	1	–	1
Indiana (PA)	4	–	1	–	1	5	–	2	–	1
Shippensburg	3	–	3	–	0	4	–	4	–	0
Clarion	3	–	3	–	0	4	–	4	–	0
Edinboro	1	–	5	–	0	3	–	5	–	0
Lock Haven	0	–	6	–	0	2	–	6	–	0
Championship: Slippery Rock 13, East Stroudsburg 6
$ – Conference champion; x – Division champion/co-champions; y – Championship game participant

1962 Rocky Mountain Conference football standings
	Conf.					Overall
Team	W		L		T	W		L		T
Adams State $	4	–	0	–	0	9	–	1	–	0
Western State (CO)	2	–	2	–	0	5	–	4	–	0
Colorado State–Greeley	2	–	2	–	0	3	–	6	–	0
Colorado Mines	1	–	3	–	0	4	–	5	–	0
Colorado College	0	–	4	–	0	1	–	7	–	1
$ – Conference champion

1962 South Dakota Intercollegiate Conference football standings
	Conf.					Overall
Team	W		L		T	W		L		T
No. 6 Northern State $^	6	–	0	–	0	9	–	1	–	0
Huron	5	–	1	–	0	5	–	4	–	0
General Beadle	3	–	3	–	0	5	–	4	–	0
Southern State (SD)	3	–	3	–	0	4	–	4	–	0
Black Hills	2	–	4	–	0	3	–	5	–	0
South Dakota Tech	2	–	4	–	0	4	–	4	–	0
Dakota Wesleyan	0	–	6	–	0	2	–	7	–	0
$ – Conference champion; ^ – NAIA playoff participant

1962 Southern California Intercollegiate Athletic Conference football standings
	Conf.					Overall
Team	W		L		T	W		L		T
Whittier $	3	–	0	–	0	8	–	1	–	0
Redlands	3	–	1	–	0	5	–	5	–	0
Claremont-Mudd	2	–	2	–	0	4	–	5	–	0
Occidental	2	–	3	–	0	6	–	3	–	0
Pomona	2	–	3	–	0	4	–	5	–	0
Caltech	0	–	3	–	0	1	–	6	–	0
$ – Conference champion

1962 Southern Intercollegiate Athletic Conference football standings
	Conf.					Overall
Team	W		L		T	W		L		T
No. 2 Florida A&M +	6	–	0	–	0	9	–	1	–	0
Alabama A&M +	6	–	0	–	0	8	–	2	–	0
Morehouse	5	–	1	–	0	6	–	2	–	0
Clark (GA)	5	–	1	–	0	6	–	1	–	0
Bethune–Cookman	6	–	2	–	0	7	–	2	–	0
Fisk	4	–	2	–	0	6	–	2	–	0
South Carolina State	4	–	3	–	0	5	–	3	–	0
Benedict	3	–	3	–	0	5	–	5	–	0
Tuskegee	4	–	4	–	0	4	–	4	–	0
Morris Brown	2	–	4	–	0	4	–	5	–	0
Lane	2	–	6	–	0	2	–	7	–	0
Allen	1	–	4	–	0	3	–	6	–	0
Fort Valley State	0	–	5	–	0	2	–	7	–	0
Alabama State	0	–	6	–	0	0	–	8	–	0
Knoxville	0	–	6	–	0	0	–	8	–	0
+ – Conference co-champions; Rankings from NAIA poll

1962 Tri-State Conference football standings
	Conf.					Overall
Team	W		L		T	W		L		T
Dana +	5	–	1	–	0	6	–	3	–	0
Concordia (NE) +	5	–	1	–	0	7	–	2	–	0
Midland	4	–	2	–	0	6	–	2	–	0
Westmar	4	–	2	–	0	5	–	4	–	0
Yankton	2	–	4	–	0	3	–	6	–	0
Sioux Falls	1	–	5	–	0	1	–	8	–	0
Northwestern (IA)	0	–	6	–	0	0	–	8	–	0
+ – Conference co-champions

1962 West Penn Conference football standings
	Conf.					Overall
Team	W		L		T	W		L		T
Westminster (PA) $	5	–	0	–	0	6	–	2	–	0
Waynesburg	3	–	1	–	0	5	–	3	–	0
Grove City	2	–	1	–	0	6	–	3	–	0
Geneva	1	–	3	–	0	1	–	5	–	1
Saint Vincent	1	–	3	–	0	1	–	6	–	0
Carnegie Tech	0	–	4	–	0	1	–	7	–	0
$ – Conference champion

1962 West Virginia Intercollegiate Athletic Conference football standings
	Conf.					Overall
Team	W		L		T	W		L		T
Eastern Division
West Liberty State x	6	–	1	–	0	7	–	1	–	0
Shepherd	1	–	1	–	2	7	–	1	–	1
Salem	2	–	4	–	0	3	–	4	–	0
West Virginia State	0	–	5	–	0	0	–	7	–	0
Western Division
Concord x$	6	–	0	–	1	6	–	2	–	1
West Virginia Wesleyan	4	–	1	–	2	5	–	1	–	2
Glenville State	3	–	4	–	0	3	–	4	–	0
West Virginia Tech	1	–	3	–	2	1	–	5	–	2
Fairmont State	1	–	4	–	2	2	–	4	–	2
Non-qualifiers
Bluefield State	1	–	0	–	1	3	–	5	–	1
Potomac State	0	–	2	–	0	0	–	5	–	0
$ – Conference champion; x – Division champion/co-champions; Fairmont State record claim a forfeited game from West Liberty State, but NCAA, conference, and West Liberty State records to do no reflect the forfeit. Conference standings based on power ratings

1962 Wisconsin State College Conference football standings
	Conf.					Overall
Team	W		L		T	W		L		T
Whitewater State $	6	–	1	–	0	6	–	3	–	0
Superior State	4	–	1	–	1	7	–	1	–	1
Stevens Point State	5	–	2	–	0	6	–	2	–	0
Eau Claire State	5	–	2	–	0	5	–	3	–	0
La Crosse State	4	–	3	–	0	4	–	5	–	0
River Falls State	3	–	4	–	0	3	–	5	–	1
Milwaukee	2	–	4	–	0	2	–	6	–	0
Platteville State	2	–	4	–	0	2	–	6	–	0
Stout State	1	–	4	–	1	2	–	5	–	1
Oshkosh State	0	–	7	–	0	0	–	7	–	0
$ – Conference champion

1962 NAIA independents football records
	Conf.			Overall
Team	W	L	T	W		L		T
Earlham		–		8	–	0	–	0
La Verne		–		6	–	2	–	0
Eastern New Mexico		–		7	–	3	–	0
Georgetown (KY)		–		5	–	3	–	0
Hillsdale		–		5	–	3	–	1
McMurry		–		6	–	4	–	0
Austin		–		5	–	4	–	0
Wheaton (IL)		–		5	–	4	–	0
Findlay		–		4	–	5	–	1
Cal Lutheran		–		3	–	4	–	0
Oklahoma Panhandle State		–		3	–	6	–	1
St. Mary of the Plains		–		1	–	8	–	0

== Postseason ==
Semifinals; December 1, 1962
Northern State	7
Lenoir Rhyne*	20
College of Emporia	0
Central State (OK)*	20

Championship; December 8, 1962; Camellia Bowl
Lenoir Ryne	13
Central State (OK)	28

== See also ==
- 1962 NCAA University Division football season
- 1962 NCAA College Division football season
