= 1959 Arizona State–Flagstaff Lumberjacks football team =

American college football season

1959 Arizona State–Flagstaff Lumberjacks football

Frontier champion
- Conference: Frontier Conference
- Record: 6–2–1 (3–0 Frontier)
- Head coach: Max Spilsbury (4th season)
- Home stadium: Lumberjack Stadium

1959 Frontier Conference football standings
	Conf.					Overall
Team	W		L		T	W		L		T
Arizona State–Flagstaff $	3	–	0	–	0	6	–	2	–	1
Panhandle A&M	2	–	1	–	0	4	–	5	–	1
New Mexico Western	0	–	2	–	1	3	–	3	–	1
New Mexico Highlands	0	–	2	–	1	2	–	5	–	2
$ – Conference champion

The 1959 Arizona State–Flagstaff Lumberjacks football team was an American football team that represented Arizona State College at Flagstaff (now known as Northern Arizona University) in the Frontier Conference during the 1959 NAIA football season. In their fourth year under head coach Max Spilsbury, the Lumberjacks compiled a 6–2–1 record, won the Frontier Conference championship, and were outscored by a total of 142 to 135.

The team played its home games at Lumberjack Stadium in Flagstaff, Arizona.

== Schedule ==
Date	Opponent	Site	Result	Attendance	Source
September 12	at New Mexico State*	Memorial Stadium; Las Cruces, NM	L 0–35	7,000	
September 19	Idaho State*	Lumberjack Stadium; Flagstaff, AZ	W 16–7	3,400	
September 26	at McMurry*	Abilene, TX	L 7–55		
October 3	Redlands*	Skidmore Field; Flagstaff, AZ	W 6–0		
October 10	Chico State*^{†}	Lumberjack Stadium; Flagstaff, AZ	W 26–12		
October 17	at New Mexico Highlands	Las Vegas, NM	W 13–7		
October 24	at Panhandle A&M	Goodwell, OK	W 27–13		
October 31	New Mexico Western	Lumberjack Stadium; Flagstaff, AZ	W 33–6		
November 7	vs. Cal Poly Pomona*	Yuma Union High School; Yuma, AZ	T 7–7		
*Non-conference game; ^{†}Homecoming
