= 1962 Arizona State–Flagstaff Lumberjacks football team =

American college football season

1962 Arizona State–Flagstaff Lumberjacks football

Frontier champion
- Conference: Frontier Conference
- Record: 6–4 (2–0 Frontier)
- Head coach: Max Spilsbury (7th season)
- Home stadium: Lumberjack Stadium

1962 Frontier Conference football standings
| | Conf. | | | | | Overall |
| Team | W | | L | | T | W | | L | | T |
|---|---|---|---|---|---|---|---|---|---|---|
| Arizona State–Flagstaff $ | 2 | – | 0 | – | 0 | 6 | – | 4 | – | 0 |
| New Mexico Highlands | 1 | – | 1 | – | 0 | 4 | – | 5 | – | 0 |
| New Mexico Western | 0 | – | 2 | – | 0 | 2 | – | 7 | – | 0 |
$ – Conference champion

The 1962 Arizona State–Flagstaff Lumberjacks football team was an American football team that represented Arizona State College at Flagstaff (now known as Northern Arizona University) in the Frontier Conference during the 1962 NAIA football season. In their seventh year under head coach Max Spilsbury, the Lumberjacks compiled a 6–4 record (2–0 against conference opponents), won the Frontier Conference championship, and were outscored by a total of 173 to 169.

The team played its home games at Lumberjack Stadium in Flagstaff, Arizona.

== Schedule ==
| Date | Time | Opponent | Site | Result | Attendance | Source |
|---|---|---|---|---|---|---|
| September 15 | | Montana State* | Lumberjack Stadium; Flagstaff, AZ | L 6–27 | 4,500 | |
| September 22 | 8:00 p.m. | Adams State* | Lumberjack Stadium; Flagstaff, AZ | W 16–0 | 3,500–4,300 | |
| September 29 | | Western State (CO)* | Lumberjack Stadium; Flagstaff, AZ | W 20–7 | 4,600 | |
| October 6 | | at Idaho State* | Spud Bowl; Pocatello, ID | W 35–26 | 6,500–6,800 | |
| October 13 | | New Mexico Highlands | Lumberjack Stadium; Flagstaff, AZ | W 17–0 | 3,700 | |
| October 20 | | at Cal Poly* | Mustang Stadium; San Luis Obispo, CA | W 21–0 | 4,000 | |
| October 27 | | at New Mexico Western | Silver City, NM | W 34–7 | 2.800 | |
| November 3 | | at Cal Poly Pomona* | Kellogg Field; Pomona, CA | L 0–38 | 3,700 | |
| November 10 | | at Whittier* | Whittier, CA | L 20–29 | | |
| November 17 | | vs. Eastern New Mexico | Wildcat Stadium; Clovis, NM | L 0–19 | | |
*Non-conference game; All times are in Mountain time
