= 1958 Arizona State–Flagstaff Lumberjacks football team =

American college football season

1958 Arizona State–Flagstaff Lumberjacks football

Frontier champion NAIA runner-up

Holiday Bowl, L 13–19 vs. Northeastern State
- Conference: Frontier Conference
- Record: 11–1 (3–0 Frontier)
- Head coach: Max Spilsbury (3rd season)
- Home stadium: Lumberjack Stadium

1958 Frontier Conference football standings
	Conf.					Overall
Team	W		L		T	W		L		T
Arizona State–Flagstaff $^	3	–	0	–	0	11	–	1	–	0
New Mexico Western	2	–	1	–	0	6	–	2	–	0
New Mexico Highlands	1	–	2	–	0	5	–	2	–	1
Panhandle A&M	0	–	3	–	0	4	–	6	–	0
$ – Conference champion; ^ – NAIA playoff participant

The 1958 Arizona State–Flagstaff Lumberjacks football team was an American football team that represented Arizona State College at Flagstaff (now known as Northern Arizona University) in the Frontier Conference during the 1958 NAIA football season. In their third year under head coach Max Spilsbury, the Lumberjacks compiled an 11–1 record, won the Frontier Conference championship, and outscored opponents by a total of 321 to 98. They lost to Northeastern State for the NAIA championship in the 1958 Holiday Bowl.

The team played its home games at Lumberjack Stadium in Flagstaff, Arizona.

== Schedule ==
Date	Opponent	Site	Result	Attendance	Source
September 13	San Diego Marines*	Lumberjack Stadium; Flagstaff, AZ	W 25–19		
September 20	vs. Cal Poly Pomona*	Brawley, CA	W 16–8		
September 27	McMurry*	Lumberjack Stadium; Flagstaff, AZ	W 13–6		
October 4	at Redlands*	Redlands, CA	W 28–14		
October 11	La Verne*^{†}	Lumberjack Stadium; Flagstaff, AZ	W 37–0		
October 18	New Mexico Highlands	Lumberjack Stadium; Flagstaff, AZ	W 20–0		
October 25	Panhandle A&M	Lumberjack Stadium; Flagstaff, AZ	W 41–7		
November 1	at New Mexico Western	Silver City, NM	W 30–7		
November 15	vs. Willamette*	Yuma, AZ	W 7–0	5,000	
November 22	at Chico State*	College Field; Chico, CA	W 40–6	3,000–3,800	
December 6	vs. Gustavus Adolphus*	Arizona Stadium; Tucson, AZ (NAIA Semifinal)	W 41–12	10,000	
December 20	vs. Northeastern State*	Al Lang Field; St. Petersburg, FL (Holiday Bowl—NAIA Championship Game)	L 13–19	8,628	
*Non-conference game; ^{†}Homecoming
