= 1957 Arizona State–Flagstaff Lumberjacks football team =

American college football season

1957 Arizona State–Flagstaff Lumberjacks football

Frontier champion
- Conference: Frontier Conference
- Record: 8–1 (3–0 Frontier)
- Head coach: Max Spilsbury (2nd season)
- Home stadium: Skidmore Stadium

1957 Frontier Conference football standings
| | Conf. | | | | | Overall |
| Team | W | | L | | T | W | | L | | T |
|---|---|---|---|---|---|---|---|---|---|---|
| Arizona State–Flagstaff $ | 3 | – | 0 | – | 0 | 8 | – | 1 | – | 0 |
| New Mexico Highlands | 1 | – | 1 | – | 1 | 3 | – | 3 | – | 1 |
| New Mexico Western | 1 | – | 1 | – | 0 | 3 | – | 3 | – | 0 |
| Panhandle A&M | 1 | – | 2 | – | 0 | 3 | – | 6 | – | 0 |
| New Mexico Military | 0 | – | 2 | – | 1 | 1 | – | 2 | – | 1 |
$ – Conference champion

The 1957 Arizona State–Flagstaff Lumberjacks football team was an American football team that represented Arizona State College at Flagstaff (now known as Northern Arizona University) in the Frontier Conference during the 1957 NAIA football season. In their second year under head coach Max Spilsbury, the Lumberjacks compiled an 8–1 record (3–0 against conference opponents), won the Frontier Conference championship, and outscored opponents by a total of 269 to 65.

The team played its home games at the newly-constructed Skidmore Stadium (later renamed Lumberjack Stadium) in Flagstaff, Arizona. The season opener against Fort Huachuca was the first game played in Skidmore Stadium.

== Schedule ==
| Date | Opponent | Site | Result | Attendance | Source |
|---|---|---|---|---|---|
| September 14 | Fort Huachuca* | Skidmore Stadium; Flagstaff, AZ | W 46–0 | | |
| September 21 | San Diego* | Skidmore Stadium; Flagstaff, AZ | W 40–6 | | |
| September 28 | Redlands* | Skidmore Stadium; Flagstaff, AZ | W 18–6 | | |
| October 5 | Cal Poly Pomona* | Skidmore Stadium; Flagstaff, AZ | W 34–7 | | |
| October 12 | Long Beach State*^{†} | Skidmore Stadium; Flagstaff, AZ | L 6–7 | | |
| October 19 | at New Mexico Highlands | Las Vegas, NM | W 13–7 | | |
| October 26 | Panhandle A&M | Goodwell, OK | W 42–0 | | |
| November 2 | New Mexico Western | Skidmore Stadium; Flagstaff, AZ | W 44–12 | | |
| November 16 | vs. Nevada* | Las Vegas, NV | W 26–20 | | |
*Non-conference game; ^{†}Homecoming
