= 1956 Arizona State–Flagstaff Lumberjacks football team =

American college football season

1956 Arizona State–Flagstaff Lumberjacks football

Frontier champion
- Conference: Frontier Conference
- Record: 8–2 (3–0 Frontier)
- Head coach: Max Spilsbury (1st season)
- Home stadium: Skidmore Field

1956 Frontier Conference football standings
	Conf.					Overall
Team	W		L		T	W		L		T
Arizona State–Flagstaff +	3	–	0	–	0	8	–	2	–	0
New Mexico Military +	3	–	0	–	0	6	–	3	–	0
New Mexico Highlands	2	–	2	–	0	5	–	2	–	1
New Mexico Western	1	–	3	–	0	5	–	4	–	0
Panhandle A&M	0	–	4	–	0	3	–	7	–	0
+ – Conference co-champions

The 1956 Arizona State–Flagstaff Lumberjacks football team was an American football team that represented Arizona State College at Flagstaff (now known as Northern Arizona University) in the Frontier Conference during the 1956 NAIA football season. In their first year under head coach Max Spilsbury, the Lumberjacks compiled an 8–2 record (3–0 against conference opponents), won the Frontier Conference championship, and outscored opponents by a total of 311 to 93.

The team played its home games at Skidmore Field in Flagstaff, Arizona.

== Schedule ==
Date	Opponent	Site	Result	Attendance	Source
September 15	at Fort Huachuca*	Bisbee, AZ	W 28–6		
September 22	Pepperdine*	Skidmore Field; Flagstaff, AZ	L 12–14		
September 29	UC Riverside*	Skidmore Field; Flagstaff, AZ	W 60–0		
October 6	at Westminster (UT)*	Salt Lake City, UT	W 29–0		
October 13	La Verne*^{†}	Skidmore Field; Flagstaff, AZ	W 27–6	4,000	
October 20	New Mexico Highlands	Skidmore Field; Flagstaff, AZ	W 28–13		
October 27	Panhandle A&M	Skidmore Field; Flagstaff, AZ	W 47–0		
November 3	at New Mexico Western	Silver City, NM	W 54–40		
November 9	at Long Beach State*	Veterans Memorial Stadium; Long Beach, CA	L 6–7	2,800	
November 17	at San Diego*	Balboa Stadium; San Diego, CA	W 20–7		
*Non-conference game; ^{†}Homecoming
