= 1962 Adams State Indians football team =

American college football season

1962 Adams State Indians football

RMC champion Mineral Water Bowl champion

Mineral Water Bowl, W 23–20 vs. Northern Illinois
- Conference: Rocky Mountain Conference
- Record: 9–1 (4–0 RMC)
- Head coach: Darrell Mudra (4th season)

1962 Rocky Mountain Conference football standings
	Conf.					Overall
Team	W		L		T	W		L		T
Adams State $	4	–	0	–	0	9	–	1	–	0
Western State (CO)	2	–	2	–	0	5	–	4	–	0
Colorado State–Greeley	2	–	2	–	0	3	–	6	–	0
Colorado Mines	1	–	3	–	0	4	–	5	–	0
Colorado College	0	–	4	–	0	1	–	7	–	1
$ – Conference champion

The 1962 Adams State Indians football team represented Adams State College—now known as Adams State University—as a member of the Rocky Mountain Conference (RMC) during the 1962 NAIA football season. Led by Darrell Mudra in his fourth and final season as head coach, the Indians compiled an overall record of 9–1 with a mark of 4–0 in conference play, winning the RMC title. Adams State was invited to the Mineral Water Bowl, where the Indians defeated Northern Illinois. The team was ranked No. 16 in the final UPI small college rankings.

== Schedule ==
Date	Time	Opponent	Site	Result	Attendance	Source
September 15	8:00 p.m.	at New Mexico Highlands*	Perkins Stadium; Las Vegas, NM	W 27–0	3,950	
September 22	8:00 p.m.	at Arizona State–Flagstaff*	Lumberjack Stadium; Flagstaff, AZ	L 0–16	3,500–4,300	
September 29		Eastern New Mexico*	Alamosa, CO	W 24–19		
October 6		Panhandle A&M*	Alamosa, CO	W 32–14		
October 14		at Western State (CO)	Gunnison, CO	W 22–7		
October 20		at New Mexico Western*	Silver City, NM	W 7–0		
October 27		Colorado State–Greeley	Alamosa, CO	W 48–28		
November 3		Colorado College	Alamosa, CO	W 28–16		
November 10		at Colorado Mines	Golden, CO	W 3–0		
November 24		vs. No. 6 Northern Illinois*	Roosevelt Field; Excelsior Springs, MO (Mineral Water Bowl)	W 23–20		
*Non-conference game; Rankings from AP Poll released prior to the game; All times are in Mountain time
