= Max Spilsbury =

American football player and coach (1924–2001)

Biographical details
- Born: June 16, 1924; Hachita, New Mexico, U.S.
- Died: November 21, 2001 (aged 77); Mexico

Playing career
- 1946–1949: Arizona

Coaching career (HC unless noted)
- 1950–1951: Globe HS (AZ)
- 1952–1954: Bisbee HS (AZ)
- 1955: Arizona (assistant)
- 1956–1964: Arizona State–Flagstaff

Head coaching record
- Overall: 58–25–5 (college)
- Tournaments: 1–1 (NAIA playoffs)

Accomplishments and honors

Championships
- 7 Frontier (1956–1962)

Max Reed Spilsbury (June 16, 1924 – November 21, 2001) was an American football player and coach. He served as the head football coach at Northern Arizona University–then known as Arizona State College at Flagstaff–from 1956 to 1964, compiling a record of 58–25–5.

Spilsbury was the father of actor Klinton Spilsbury.

== Head coaching record ==
Year	Team	Overall	Conference	Standing	Bowl/playoffs
Arizona State–Flagstaff Lumberjacks (Frontier Conference) (1956–1962)
1956	Arizona State–Flagstaff	8–2	3–0	1st	
1957	Arizona State–Flagstaff	8–1	3–0	1st	
1958	Arizona State–Flagstaff	11–1	3–0	1st	L NAIA Championship
1959	Arizona State–Flagstaff	6–2–1	3–0	1st	
1960	Arizona State–Flagstaff	6–3–2	2–0–1	T–1st	
1961	Arizona State–Flagstaff	3–5–1	1–0–1	1st	
1962	Arizona State–Flagstaff	6–4	2–0	1st	
Arizona State–Flagstaff Lumberjacks (NAIA independent) (1963–1964)
1963	Arizona State–Flagstaff	5–3–1			
1964	Arizona State–Flagstaff	5–4			
Arizona State–Flagstaff:		58–25–5	17–0–2		
Total:		58–25–5			
National championship Conference title Conference division title or championship game berth
