= Falcon Stadium =

College football stadium in Colorado, US

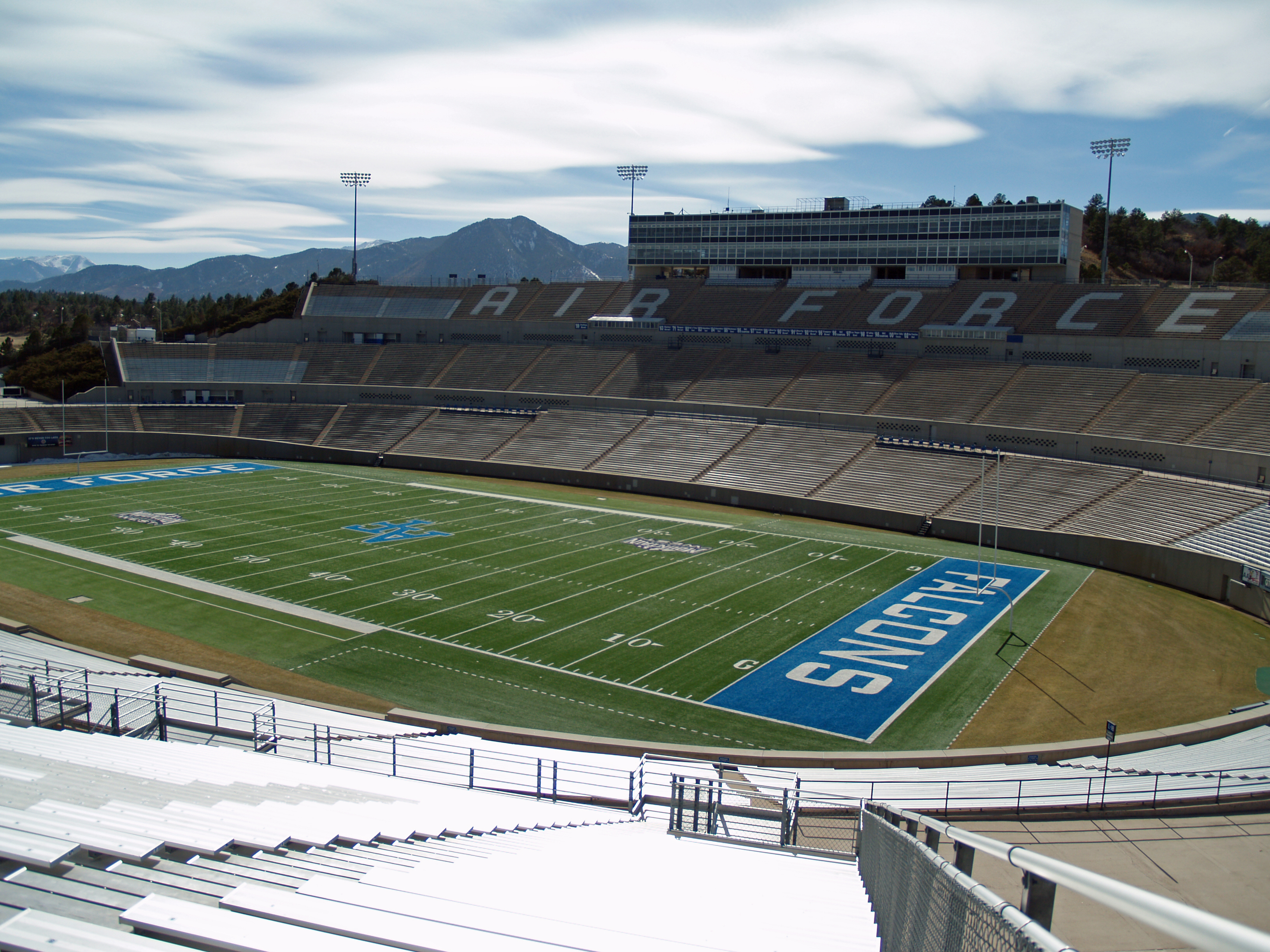
- View from northeast corner in 2008

- Location in the United States Location in Colorado
- Interactive map of Falcon Stadium
- Address: 4900 Stadium Boulevard
- Location: U.S. Air Force Academy, Colorado, U.S. near Colorado Springs
- Coordinates: 38.997°N 104.843°W
- Elevation: 6,621 feet (2,018 m) AMSL
- Owner: U.S. Air Force Academy
- Operator: U.S. Air Force Academy
- Capacity: 39,441 (2024–present); 46,692 (2005–present); 52,480 (1996–2004); 50,126 (1995); 52,000 (1993–1994); 52,123 (1986–1992); 46,668 (1972–1985); 40,828 (1962–1971)
- Surface: FieldTurf (2006–present); Natural grass (1962–2005)
- Record attendance: 56,409 (vs. Notre Dame, 2002)

Construction
- Opened: September 22, 1962; 64 years ago
- Expanded: 1972, 1990
- Cost: $3.5 million ($37.3 million in 2025)
- Architects: Praeger-Kavanaugh-Waterbury; Slater Paul Architects (renovations), HKS, Inc. (2024 renovations)
- Structural engineer: HKS, Inc. (2024 renovations)
- General contractor: B. H. Baker Inc.

Tenant
- Air Force Falcons (NCAA) (1962–present)

Falcon Stadium is an outdoor football stadium in the western United States, on the campus of the U.S. Air Force Academy near Colorado Springs, Colorado. It is the home field of the Air Force Falcons football and lacrosse teams of the Mountain West Conference, and also holds the academy's graduation ceremonies each spring.

== History ==
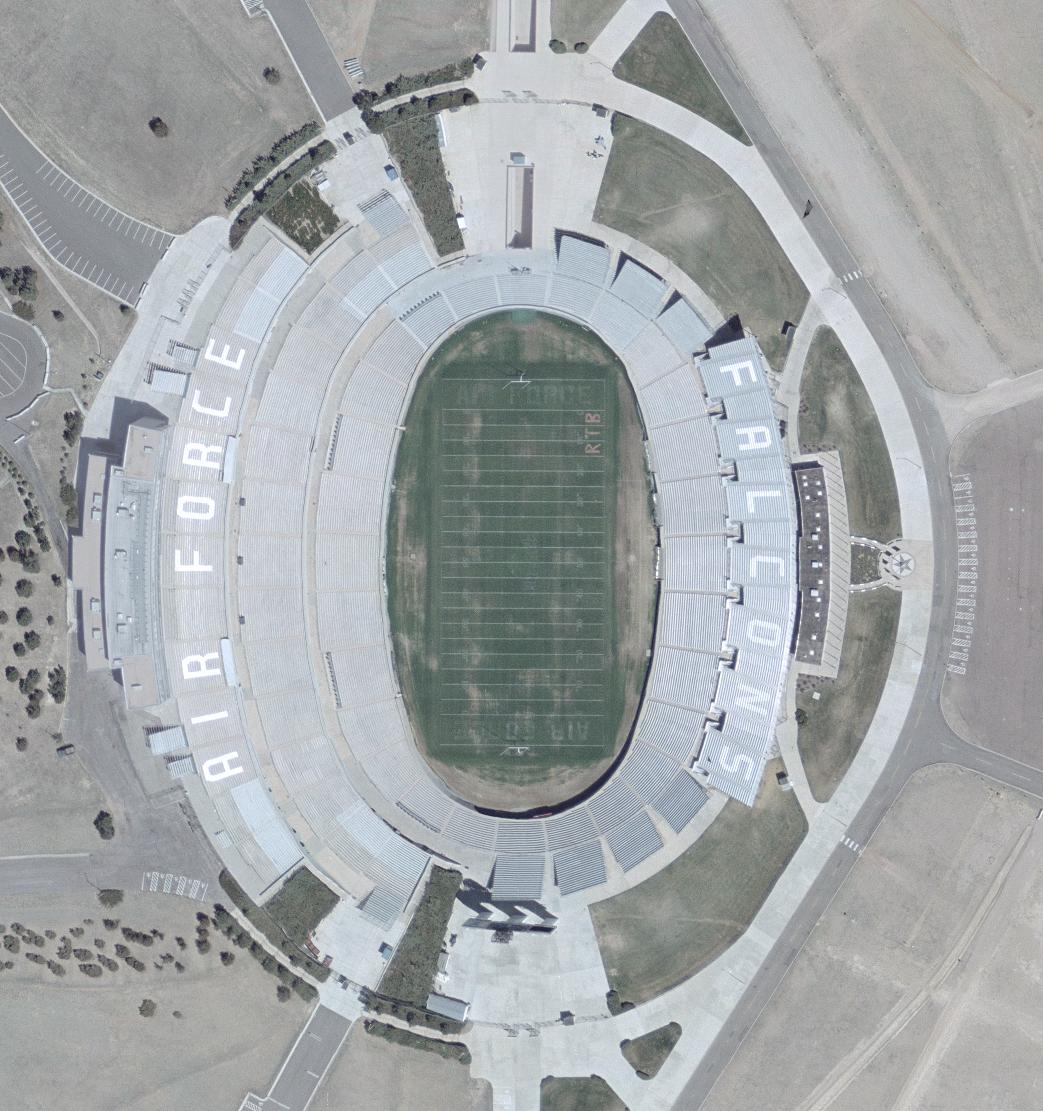
April 2002 satellite view

From 1956 to 1961, Air Force played its home games at various sites along the Front Range in Colorado. Most games were played in Denver at the University of Denver's stadium, but several were played in Colorado Springs, Pueblo, and CU's Folsom Field in Boulder.

Planned in 1955, Falcon Stadium opened 64 years ago in 1962, at a cost of $3.5 million, and has a current seating capacity of 46,692. The first game was on September 22, a 34–0 victory over Colorado State. It was officially dedicated four weeks later on October 20, with a ceremony which included the Thunderbirds.

== Construction ==
The U.S. Air Force Academy lies at the base of the Rampart Range of the Rocky Mountains, northwest of adjacent Colorado Springs. Built into a natural bowl about two miles (3 km) southeast and five hundred vertical feet (150 m) below the cadet area, Falcon Stadium is approximately a mile (1.6 km) west of Interstate 25.

With an unbalanced design and a traditional north–south alignment, the western sideline has the press box and two large grandstand tiers above the main bowl; the eastern side has a single tier, bordered by seven separate sections of grandstands.

== Elevation ==
The FieldTurf playing field is at an elevation of 6,621 feet (2,018 m) above sea level, the second highest in FBS college football, exceeded only by conference foe Wyoming's War Memorial Stadium in Laramie, which is six hundred feet (180 m) higher.

Bill Belichick decided to use the stadium to prepare his New England Patriots for their 2017 NFL Mexico Game at Estadio Azteca in Mexico City in mid-November. The Patriots had played in nearby Denver the previous Sunday, so they remained in Colorado to prepare for their Mexico trip. Estadio Azteca is at a similar altitude of 7,200 feet (2,195 m), and the Patriots defeated the Oakland Raiders there by 25 points.

The Los Angeles Rams employed a similar strategy the following year, with practices at Falcon Stadium, but the 2018 game was moved to Los Angeles because of poor field conditions at Azteca.

== Improvements ==
Falcon Stadium had a natural grass field for its first 44 years, although the sideline areas where teams stood were artificial turf since the 1980s. Prior to the 2006 season, synthetic FieldTurf was installed at a cost of $750,000.

The stadium has been expanded twice, and the 2005 renovation lowered the total seating capacity. Permanent lighting was installed in Falcon Stadium in 2002 at a cost of $500,000, and the video screen at the south end of the field debuted in 2004. A new sound system was also installed for the 2006 season.

The scoreboard was removed after the 2015 season, and a new, larger video board measuring 31 ft 2 in (9.5 m) tall by 82 ft 8 in (25.2 m) wide, with a total surface area of more than 2,500 square feet (230 m^{2}). At its installation in 2016, it was the largest in the Mountain West Conference and amongst the service academies. A second video board was also installed behind the northeast stands prior to the 2016 season.

== Events ==
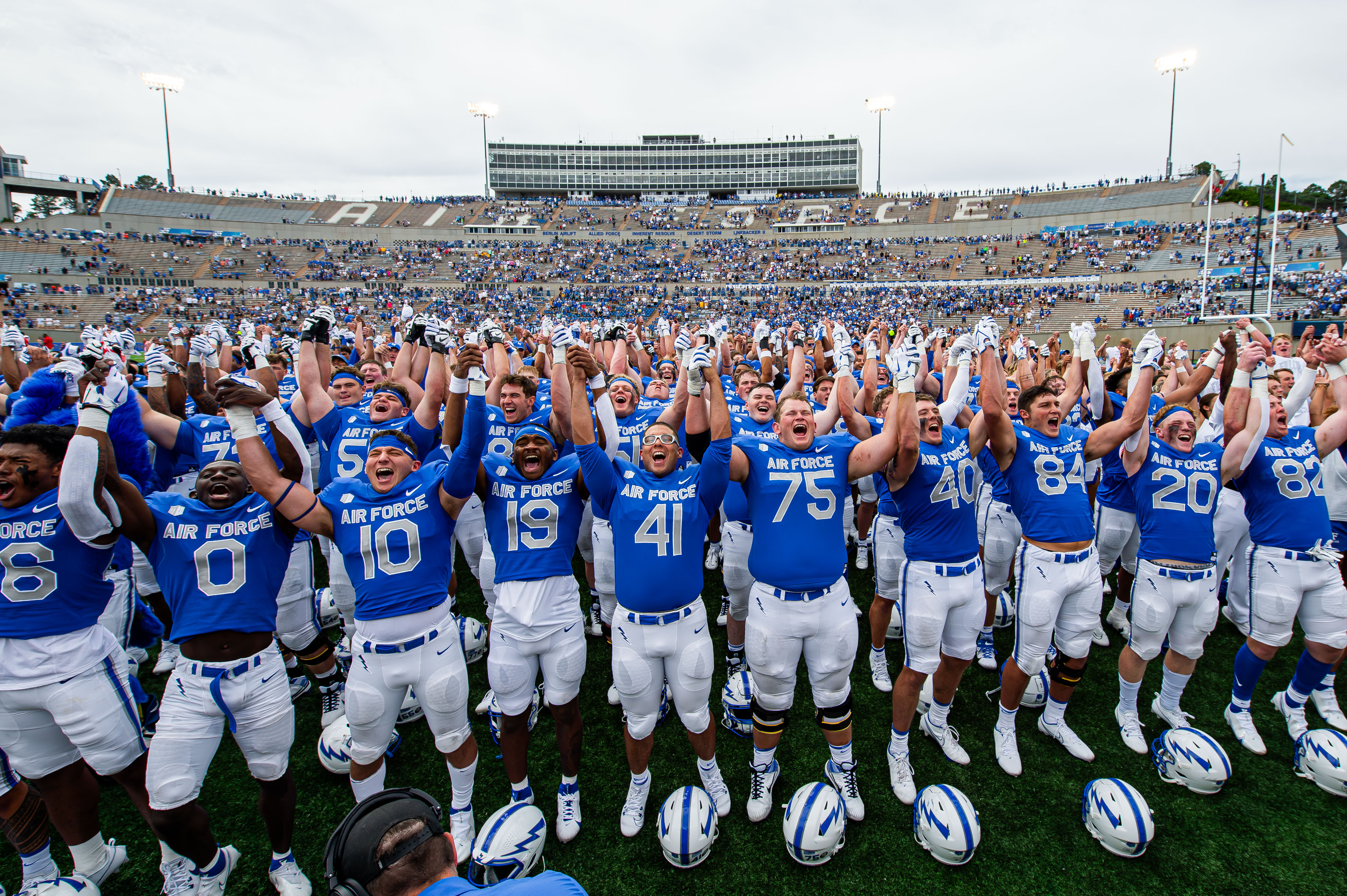
Air Force football players after a win over Robert Morris in 2023

=== Ice hockey ===
Falcon Stadium hosted the 2020 NHL Stadium Series outdoor game between the Colorado Avalanche and the Los Angeles Kings.

Date	Winning Team	Result	Losing Team	Event	Attendance
February 15, 2020	Los Angeles Kings	3–1	Colorado Avalanche	2020 NHL Stadium Series	43,574

== See also ==
- List of NCAA Division I FBS football stadiums
