= Northern Arizona Lumberjacks football =

American college football team

Northern Arizona Lumberjacks Football
2026 Northern Arizona Lumberjacks football team
- First season: 1915; 111 years ago
- Athletic director: Dr. Richard Duran
- Head coach: Brian Wright; 3rd season, 15–10 (.600)
- Location: Flagstaff, Arizona
- Stadium: Walkup Skydome (capacity: 10,500)
- NCAA division: Division I FCS
- Conference: Big Sky
- Colors: Blue and gold
- All-time record: 512–495–23 (.508)

Conference championships
- Frontier: 1956, 1957, 1958, 1959, 1960, 1961, 1962 Big Sky: 1978, 2003
- Rivalries: Southern Utah (rivalry); Weber State (rivalry)
- Website: nauathletics.com

The NAU Lumberjacks football program is the intercollegiate American football team for the Northern Arizona University located in Flagstaff, Arizona. The team competes in the NCAA Division I Football Championship Subdivision (FCS) and is a member of the Big Sky Conference. The school's first football team was fielded in 1915. The team plays its home games at the 10,500 seat Walkup Skydome. Brian Wright was hired as the Head Football Coach on December 3, 2023.

== History ==
The Lumberjacks have maintained numerous rivalries with their western counterparts. Competition has not only been limited to the west. The Lumberjacks have also taken on eastern programs such as the Ole Miss Rebels, Florida Atlantic Owls, and the Appalachian State Mountaineers.

On September 18, 2021, Northern Arizona beat Arizona for the first time since 1932, winning 21–19. It was their first win against a FBS team since beating UTEP in 2018 and their third overall win against an FBS team since 2012. It is also the first time they beat a member of the Pac-12 Conference.

=== Classifications ===
- 1937–1952: NCAA College Division
- 1953–1968: NAIA
- 1969–1972: NCAA College Division
- 1973–1977: NCAA Division II
- 1978–present: NCAA Division I

== Conference affiliations ==
- Independent (1915–1930, 1963–1969)
- Border Conference (1931–1952)
- New Mexico Conference / Frontier Conference (1953–1962)
- Big Sky Conference (1970–present)

== Championships ==
=== Conference championships ===
Northern Arizona has won nine conference championships, six outright and three shared.

Year	Coach	Conference	Overall record	Conference record
1956†	Max Spilsbury	Frontier Conference	8–2	3–0
1957	Max Spilsbury	Frontier Conference	8–1	3–0
1958	Max Spilsbury	Frontier Conference	11–1	3–0
1959	Max Spilsbury	Frontier Conference	6–2–1	3–0
1960†	Max Spilsbury	Frontier Conference	6–3–2	2–0–1
1961	Max Spilsbury	Frontier Conference	3–5–1	1–0–1
1962	Max Spilsbury	Frontier Conference	6–4	2–0
1978	Joe Salem	Big Sky Conference	8–2	6–0
2003†	Jerome Souers	Big Sky Conference	9–4	5–2

== Postseason results ==
=== NCAA Division I-AA/FCS playoffs ===
The Lumberjacks have appeared in the NCAA I-AA/FCS playoffs seven times, with an overall record of 1–6.

Year	Round	Opponent	Result	Head coach
1996	First Round	Furman	L 32–41	Steve Axman
1999	First Round	@ Georgia Southern	L 29–72	Jerome Souers
2001	First Round	@ Sam Houston State	L 31–34	Jerome Souers
2003	First Round; Quarterfinals	@ McNeese State; Florida Atlantic	W 35–3; L 25–48	Jerome Souers
2013	First Round	South Dakota State	L 7–26	Jerome Souers
2017	First Round	San Diego	L 10–41	Jerome Souers
2024	First Round	Abilene Christian	L 0–24	Brian Wright

=== NCAA Division II playoffs ===
Year	Round	Opponent	Result	Head coach
1977	Quarterfinals	Jacksonville State	L 0–35	Joe Salem

- NAU was runner-up in Big Sky to champion Boise State, which had a scheduling conflict.

=== NAIA ===
Year	Round	Opponent	Result	Head coach
1958	Semifinal	Gustavus Adolphus	W 41–12	Max Spilsbury
1958	Final	Northeastern State	L 13–19	Max Spilsbury

== Rivalries ==
=== Southern Utah ===
Northern Arizona leads Southern Utah 17–10 in the series through the 2025 season.

=== Weber State ===
Northern Arizona is tied with Weber State 29–29 overall in the series through the 2025 season and also has a 2–2 record for the Red Rock Rivalry trophy, with the last meeting in Ogden on November 22, 2025 losing 48–28.

== Current coaching staff ==
Name	Position
Brian Wright	Head coach/Quarterbacks Coach
Bryan Larson	Offensive Coordinator/Offensive Line Coach
Trenton Greene	Defensive Coordinator/Safeties Coach
Aman Anand	Special Teams Coordinator
Jerry DiMinno	Wide Receivers Coach
Nick Fett	Tight Ends Coach
Preston Mays	Running Backs Coach
Rodney Brown	Defensive Backs Coach/Pass Game Coordinator/
Max Silver	Linebackers Coach/Run Game Coordinator
Kendall Coleman	Defensive Line Coach

== Notable former players ==
Notable alumni include:

- Khalil Dorsey: American professional football cornerback for the Detroit Lions of the NFL. He was signed by the Baltimore Ravens as an undrafted free agent in 2020.
- John Bonds
- Shawn Collins
- Michael Haynes
- Michael Mendoza
- Rex Mirich, first Lumberjack football player to be inducted into the College Football Hall of Fame
- Keith O'Neil
- Khalil Paden
- Speedy Duncan: Played six years professional football in the American Football League (AFL).
- Travis Brown: Played for the Seattle Seahawks and Buffalo Bills from 2000 to 2003.
- Willard Reaves: Played pro football in the Canadian Football League and the National Football League. In the CFL he played for the Winnipeg Blue Bombers, where his team won the 1984 Grey Cup and, in the same season, Reaves won the Most Outstanding Player Award. He also played for the Washington Redskins and Miami Dolphins in the NFL.
- Tom Jurich, former athletic director at the University of Louisville
- Archie Amerson
- Pete Mandley
- Allan Clark
- Derek Mason – college football coach
- Case Cookus
- Frank Pollack
- Sonny Campbell NFL running back

== Future non-conference opponents ==
Announced schedules as of November 5, 2026.

2027	2028	2029	2030	2031	2032	2033	2034
Northern Iowa	at Arizona State	McNeese	at Arizona	at Arizona	at Arizona	at Arizona	at Arizona State
at Incarnate Word	at McNeese	at Arizona State					
at Arizona		at Northern Iowa					
