= 1962 college football season =

1962 college football season may refer to:

- 1962 NCAA University Division football season
- 1962 NCAA College Division football season
- 1962 NAIA football season
