= Gil Kuhn =

American football player and coach (1915–2006)

Biographical details
- Born: January 5, 1915; Placentia, California, U.S.
- Died: April 12, 2006 (aged 91); Anaheim, California, U.S.

Playing career
- 1932–1936: USC
- 1937: New York Yankees (AFL)
- 1940: Hollywood Bears
- Position: Center

Coaching career (HC unless noted)
- 1938: Glendale (CA)
- 1943: Lowry Field
- 1956: San Diego

Accomplishments and honors

Awards
- Second-team All-PCC (1936)

Gilbert James Kuhn (January 5, 1915 – April 12, 2006) was an American football player and coach. He played college football for the USC Trojans under head coach Howard Jones and was selected by the Brooklyn Dodgers of the National Football League (NFL) in the 1937 NFL draft.

Kuhn served as head coach of the 1943 Lowry Field Bombers football team. He was the head football coach at the University of San Diego in 1956.

Kuhn died from heart failure on April 12, 2006.

== Head coaching record ==
=== College ===
| Year | Team | Overall | Conference | Standing | Bowl/playoffs |
|---|---|---|---|---|---|
Lowry Field Bombers (Independent) (1943)
| 1943 | Lowry Field | 1–3 | | | |
| Lowry Field: | | 1–3 | | | |
San Diego Pioneers (Independent) (1956)
| 1956 | San Diego | 2–3 | | | |
| San Diego: | | 1–3 | | | |
| Total: | | 3–6 | | | |

=== Junior college ===
| Year | Team | Overall | Conference | Standing | Bowl/playoffs |
|---|---|---|---|---|---|
Glendale Vaqueros (Western Junior College Conference) (1938)
| 1938 | Glendale | | 2–5 | 7th | |
| Glendale: | | | 2–5 | | |
| Total: | | | | | |
