= 1956 Air Force Falcons football team =

American college football season

1956 Air Force Falcons football
- Conference: Independent
- Record: 6–2–1
- Head coach: Buck Shaw (1st season)
- Captains: Larry Thomson; Charles Zaleski
- Home stadium: DU Stadium

1956 Western major college football independents records
	Conf.			Overall
Team	W	L	T	W		L		T
Air Force		–		6	–	2	–	1
Pacific (CA)		–		6	–	3	–	1
San Jose State		–		2	–	7	–	1

The 1956 Air Force Falcons football team represented the United States Air Force Academy as an independent during the 1956 college football season. The Falcons did not have an official stadium during the season, and remained without one until the 1962 season when Falcon Stadium was opened. Led by first-year head coach Buck Shaw, it was the second season for the United States Air Force Academy American football program. The Falcons finished with a record of 6–2–1.

== Schedule ==
Date	Opponent	Site	Result	Attendance	Source
September 29	at San Diego	San Diego, CA	W 46–0		
October 6	at Colorado College	Washburn Field; Colorado Springs, CO	W 53–14	9,000	
October 13	Western State (CO)	DU Stadium; Denver, CO	W 48–13		
October 20	Colorado Mines	DU Stadium; Denver, CO	W 49–6		
October 27	Eastern New Mexico	DU Stadium; Denver, CO	W 34–7		
November 3	Colorado State–Greeley	DU Stadium; Denver, CO	W 21–0		
November 10	at Whitter	ELAC Stadium; Monterey Park, CA	T 14–14	9,000	
November 17	Idaho State	Pueblo, CO	L 7–13		
November 24	BYU	DU Stadium; Denver, CO	L 21–34	7,127	

== Roster ==
1956 Air Force Falcons football team roster
Players
Coaches
Offense

Pos.	#	Name	Class
E		Tom Jozwiak	So
OL		Brock Strom	So

Defense

Pos.	#	Name	Class
DL		Dave Phillips	So

Special teams

Pos.	#	Name	Class

Head coach

- Buck Shaw

Coordinators/assistant coaches

Legend

- (C) Team captain
- (S) Suspended
- (I) Ineligible
- Injured
- Redshirt
