= Esperanza, Arecibo, Puerto Rico =

Barrio of Puerto Rico

Esperanza
- Barrio
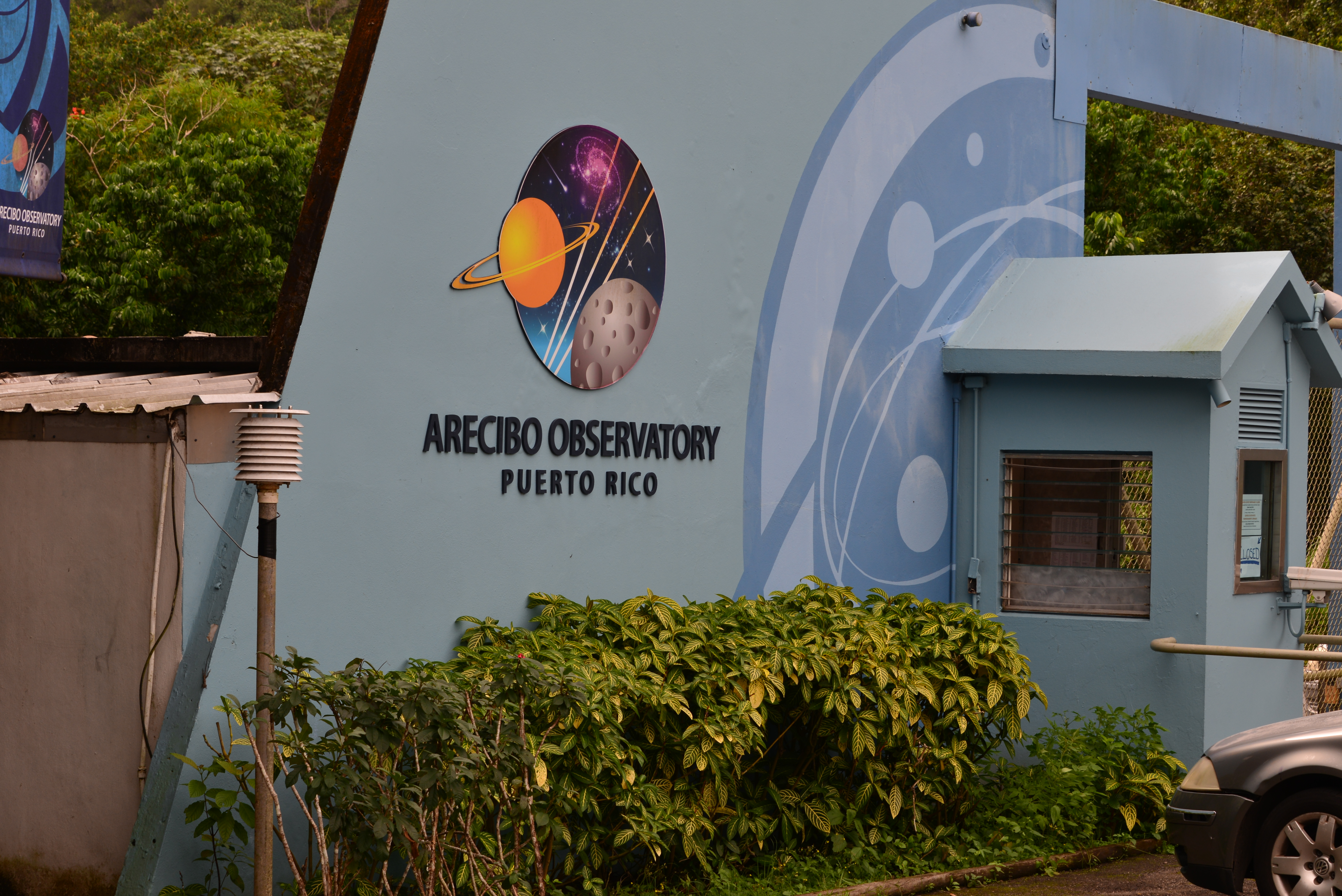
- Entrance sign for the Arecibo Observatory in Esperanza

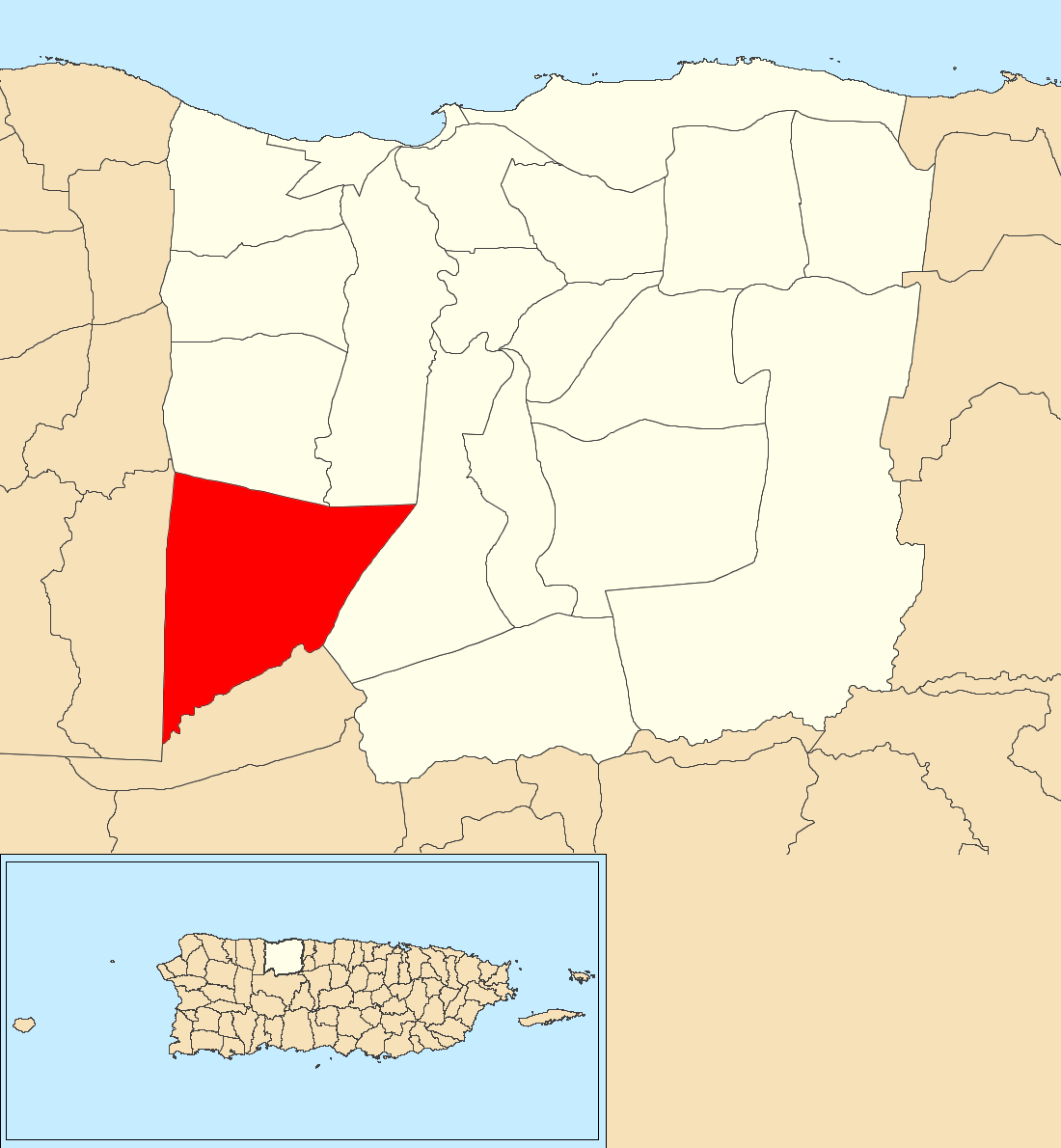
- Location of Esperanza within the municipality of Arecibo shown in red

- Location of Puerto Rico
- Coordinates: 18°21′51″N 66°44′54″W
- Commonwealth: Puerto Rico
- Municipality: Arecibo

Area
  - Total: 10.01 sq mi (25.9 km^{2})
  - Land: 10.00 sq mi (25.9 km^{2})
  - Water: 0.010 sq mi (0.026 km^{2})
- Elevation: 974 ft (297 m)

Population (2010)
  - Total: 1,882
  - Density: 188.2/sq mi (72.7/km^{2})
- Source: 2010 Census
- Time zone: UTC−4 (AST)

Esperanza is a barrio in the municipality of Arecibo, Puerto Rico. Its population in 2010 was 1,882.

== History ==
Esperanza was in Spain's gazetteers until Puerto Rico was ceded by Spain in the aftermath of the Spanish–American War under the terms of the Treaty of Paris of 1898 and became an unincorporated territory of the United States. In 1899, the United States Department of War conducted a census of Puerto Rico finding that the population of Esperanza barrio was 2,843.

Historical population
Census	Pop.	Note	%±
1900	2,843		—
1910	2,787		−2.0%
1920	2,812		0.9%
1930	3,030		7.8%
1940	2,894		−4.5%
1950	3,284		13.5%
1960	2,105		−35.9%
1970	1,598		−24.1%
1980	1,497		−6.3%
1990	1,847		23.4%
2000	2,130		15.3%
2010	1,882		−11.6%
U.S. Decennial Census; 1899 (shown as 1900) 1910-1930; 1930-1950 1980-2000 2010

== Sectors ==
Barrios (which are, in contemporary times, roughly comparable to minor civil divisions) in turn are further subdivided into smaller local populated place areas/units called sectores (sectors in English). The types of sectores may vary, from normally sector to urbanización to reparto to barriada to residencial, among others.

The following sectors are in Esperanza barrio:

Comunidad Juan A. Díaz Crespo, Comunidad Richie Crespo, Sector Arenita, Sector Cienegueta, Sector Hess, Sector Hoyo Caña, Sector La Paloma, Sector Las Marías II, Sector Las Marías, Sector Patillo, Sector San Rafael, Sector Sonadora, and Sector Sonadora Chiquita.

== Climate ==
Climate data for Arecibo Observatory (elevation: 1,060 feet (320 m)) (1991–2020 normals, extremes 1980–present)
Month	Jan	Feb	Mar	Apr	May	Jun	Jul	Aug	Sep	Oct	Nov	Dec	Year
Record high °F (°C)	93 (34)	94 (34)	94 (34)	93 (34)	94 (34)	97 (36)	97 (36)	95 (35)	95 (35)	96 (36)	93 (34)	92 (33)	97 (36)
Mean daily maximum °F (°C)	79.9 (26.6)	80.7 (27.1)	81.9 (27.7)	83.2 (28.4)	84.7 (29.3)	86.7 (30.4)	86.6 (30.3)	86.4 (30.2)	86.3 (30.2)	85.5 (29.7)	82.4 (28.0)	80.7 (27.1)	83.8 (28.8)
Daily mean °F (°C)	70.4 (21.3)	70.6 (21.4)	71.3 (21.8)	72.8 (22.7)	74.6 (23.7)	76.3 (24.6)	76.4 (24.7)	76.7 (24.8)	76.5 (24.7)	75.8 (24.3)	73.6 (23.1)	71.6 (22.0)	73.9 (23.3)
Mean daily minimum °F (°C)	61.0 (16.1)	60.6 (15.9)	60.6 (15.9)	62.4 (16.9)	64.5 (18.1)	65.9 (18.8)	66.3 (19.1)	66.9 (19.4)	66.7 (19.3)	66.1 (18.9)	64.7 (18.2)	62.6 (17.0)	64.0 (17.8)
Record low °F (°C)	45 (7)	48 (9)	47 (8)	47 (8)	51 (11)	54 (12)	52 (11)	50 (10)	53 (12)	50 (10)	54 (12)	47 (8)	45 (7)
Average precipitation inches (mm)	4.33 (110)	3.45 (88)	5.28 (134)	7.43 (189)	10.40 (264)	6.71 (170)	6.87 (174)	9.53 (242)	9.91 (252)	8.29 (211)	7.55 (192)	4.83 (123)	84.58 (2,148)
Average precipitation days (≥ 0.01 in)	12.3	10.2	11.7	13.5	16.1	12.7	15.0	15.7	16.7	17.0	16.3	13.6	170.8
Source: NOAA

== Gallery ==
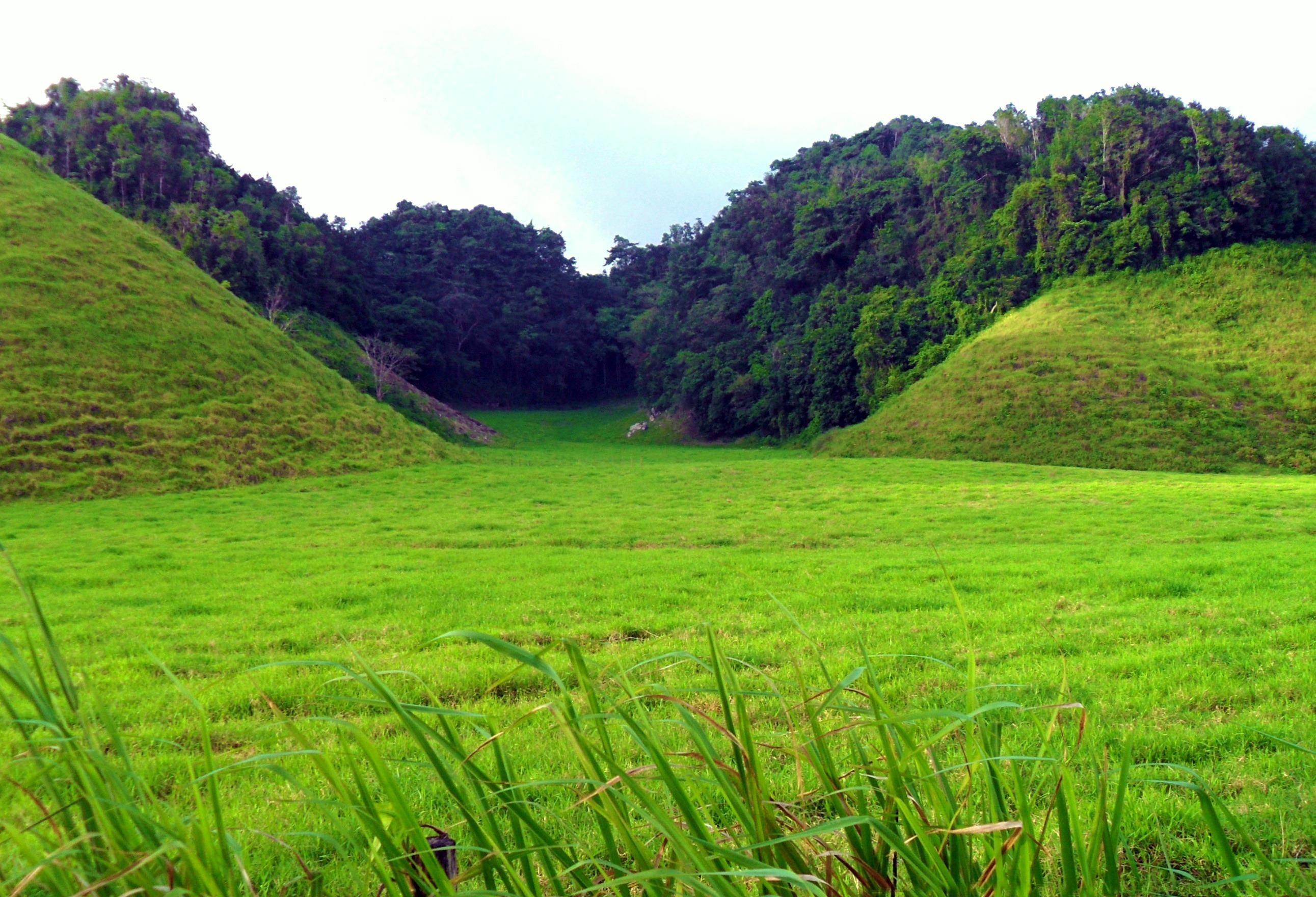
Mogotes on border of Hatillo and Sector Hess in Esperanza barrio

== See also ==
- List of communities in Puerto Rico
- List of barrios and sectors of Arecibo, Puerto Rico
