= 1967 NAIA World Series =

1967 NAIA baseball tournament
- 1967 NAIA World Series
- Teams: 8
- Format: Double elimination
- Finals site: Phil Welch Stadium; St. Joseph, Missouri
- Champions: New Mexico Highlands (1st title)
- MVP: Ken Lange (Glassboro State)

The 1967 NAIA World Series was the 11th annual tournament hosted by the National Association of Intercollegiate Athletics to determine the national champion of baseball among its member colleges and universities in the United States and Canada.

The tournament was played at Phil Welch Stadium in St. Joseph, Missouri.

New Mexico Highlands defeated Glassboro State in the championship series, 6–1, to win the Cowboys' first NAIA World Series.

Glassboro State player Ken Lange was named tournament MVP.

== Bracket ==
First round | Second round | Semifinals | National Championship
Glassboro State | 5
Occidental | 1
Glassboro State | 4
New Mexico Highlands | 5
Kearney State | 3
New Mexico Highlands | 5
New Mexico Highlands | 7
Grambling | 2
Eastern Michigan | 2
Georgia Southern | 8
Georgia Southern | 5
Grambling | 6
Grambling | 8
William Jewell | 2 | New Mexico Highlands | 6
Glassboro State | 1
Consolation first round | Consolation second round | Consolation third round | Consolation fourth round
Georgia Southern | 1
Occidental | 10 | Occidental | 2 | Grambling | 1
Kearney State | 4 | Occidental | 1 | Glassboro State | 2
Glassboro State | 2
Glassboro State | 6
Eastern Michigan | 1 | Eastern Michigan | 3
William Jewell | 0

== See also ==
- 1967 NCAA University Division baseball tournament
