= Arecibo Observatory =

Radio observatory in Arecibo, Puerto Rico

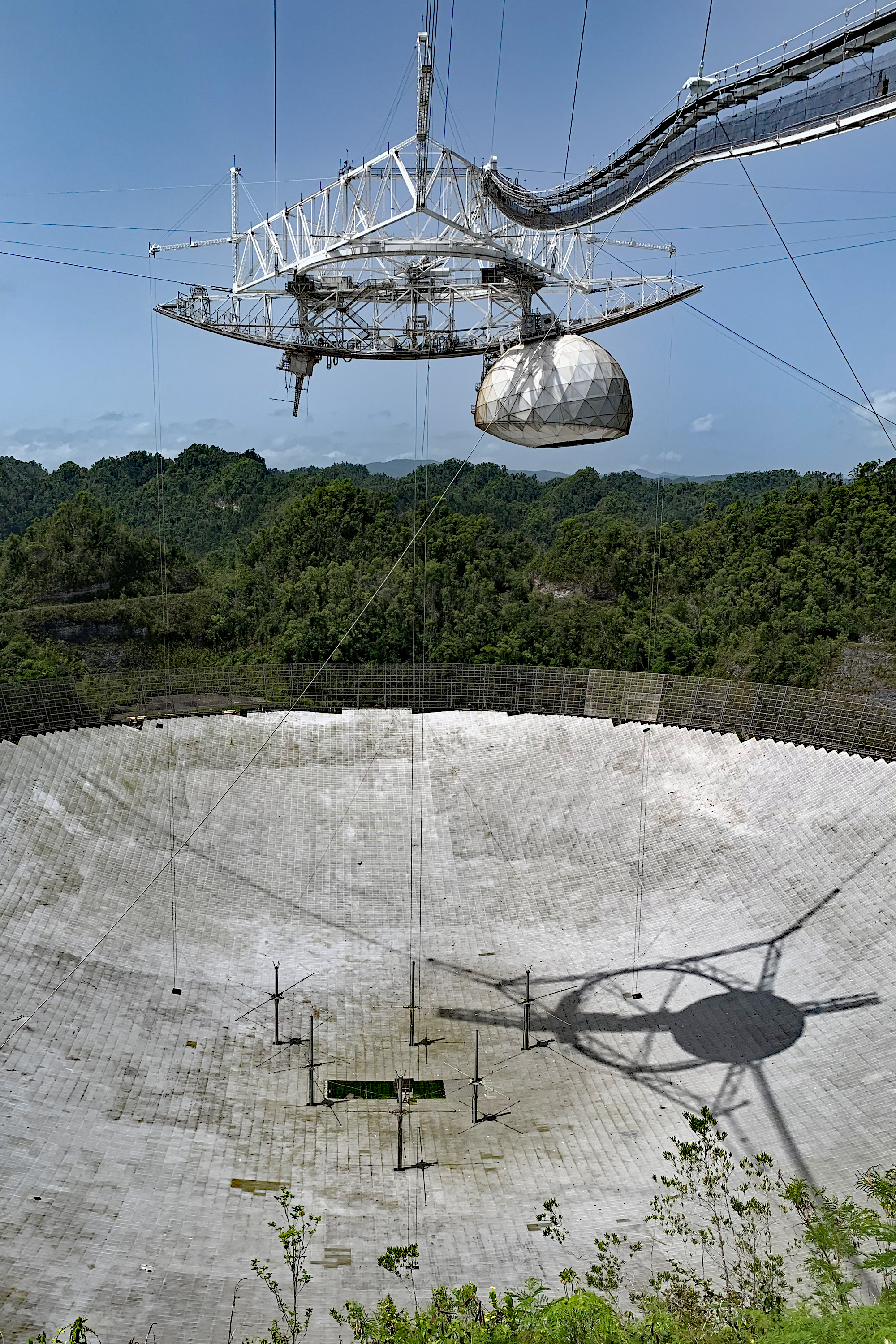
- The Arecibo Telescope in 2019
- Alternative names: National Astronomy and Ionosphere Center
- Named after: Arecibo
- Organization: University of Central Florida
- Observatory code: 251
- Location: Esperanza, Arecibo, Puerto Rico
- Coordinates: 18°20′39″N 66°45′10″W
- Altitude: 498 m (1,634 ft)
- Website: www.naic.edu
- Telescopes: Arecibo 12m radio telescope; Arecibo Telescope
- Related media on Commons
- National Astronomy and Ionosphere Center
- U.S. National Register of Historic Places
- U.S. Historic district
- Interactive map of National Astronomy and Ionosphere Center
- Nearest city: Arecibo
- Area: 118 acres (48 ha)
- Built: 1963
- Architect: Kavanagh, T. C.
- Engineer: von Seb, Inc., T. C. Kavanagh of Praeger-Kavanagh, and Severud-Elstad-Krueger Associates
- NRHP reference No.: 07000525
- Added to NRHP: September 23, 2008

The Arecibo Observatory, also known as the National Astronomy and Ionosphere Center (NAIC) and formerly known as the Arecibo Ionosphere Observatory, is an observatory in Barrio Esperanza, Arecibo, Puerto Rico, owned by the US National Science Foundation (NSF).

The observatory's main instrument was the Arecibo Telescope, a 305 m (1,000 ft) spherical reflector dish built into a natural sinkhole, with a cable-mount steerable receiver and several radar transmitters for emitting signals mounted 150 m (492 ft) above the dish. Completed in 1963, it was the world's largest single-aperture telescope for 53 years, surpassed in July 2016 by the Five-hundred-meter Aperture Spherical Telescope (FAST) in China. On August 10 and November 6, 2020, two of the receiver's support cables broke and the NSF announced that it would decommission the telescope. The telescope collapsed on December 1, 2020. In 2022, the NSF announced the telescope would not be rebuilt, with an educational facility to be established on the site.

The observatory also includes a smaller radio telescope, a LIDAR facility, and a visitor center, which remained operational after the telescope's collapse. The asteroid 4337 Arecibo was named after the observatory by Steven J. Ostro, in recognition of the observatory's contributions to the characterization of Solar System bodies.

== History ==
In the 1950s, the United States Department of Defense (DoD) Advanced Research Projects Agency (ARPA) was seeking a means to detect missiles in Earth's ionosphere. On November 6, 1959, Cornell University entered into a contract with ARPA to carry out development studies for a large-scale ionospheric radar probe. The Arecibo Telescope was consequently built to study the ionosphere as well as to serve as a general-purpose radio telescope. Construction of the telescope was started in September 1960. The telescope and supporting observatory were formally opened as the Arecibo Ionospheric Observatory on November 1, 1963.

DoD transferred the observatory to the National Science Foundation on October 1, 1969. NSF appointed Cornell University to manage the observatory. By September 1971, NSF had renamed the observatory the National Astronomy and Ionosphere Center (NAIC) and had made it a federally funded research and development center (FFRDC). NASA began contributing funds to the observatory alongside NSF for its planetary radar mission.

In the early 2000s, NASA eliminated funding for the Arecibo Observatory. In 2006, NSF indicated that it would reduce funding for the observatory, and decommission it if other funding could not be found. Academics and politicians lobbied to stave off its closure, and NASA recommitted funding in 2011 for study of near-Earth objects. In 2011, NSF delisted Arecibo as an FFRDC, which allowed the observatory to seek funding from a wider variety of sources; the agency also replaced Cornell as the site operator with a team led by SRI International.

Damage to the telescope by 2017's Hurricane Maria led NSF again to suggest closing the observatory. A consortium led by the University of Central Florida (UCF) proposed to manage the observatory and cover much of the operations and maintenance costs, and in 2018, NSF made UCF's consortium the new site operators, though no specific actions or funding were announced.

On August 6, 2020, an auxiliary cable broke on the telescope, followed by a main cable on November 7. The NSF announced that they would decommission the telescope through controlled demolition, but that the other facilities on the observatory would remain operational. Before demolition could occur, remaining support cables from one tower rapidly failed in the morning of December 1, 2020, causing the instrument platform to crash through the dish, shearing off the tops of the support towers, and partially damaging some of the other buildings, though with no injuries. NSF officials said in 2020 that they aimed to have the other observatory facilities operational as soon as possible and were considering rebuilding a new telescope instrument in its place. However, in 2022, the NSF announced the telescope would not be rebuilt but an educational facility would be established on the site. The following year, NSF picked a consortium of universities—Cold Spring Harbor Laboratory in New York; the University of Maryland, Baltimore County; the University of Puerto Rico, Río Piedras Campus, in San Juan; and the University of the Sacred Heart, also in San Juan—to set up and run an education center called Arecibo C3 (Arecibo Center for Culturally Relevant and Inclusive Science Education, Computational Skills, and Community Engagement).

== Facilities ==
=== Arecibo Telescope ===
The observatory's main feature was its large radio telescope, the main collecting dish of which was an inverted spherical dome 1,000 feet (305 m) in diameter with an 869-foot (265 m) radius of curvature, constructed inside a karst sinkhole. The dish's surface was made of 38,778 perforated aluminum panels, each about 3 by 7 feet (1 by 2 m), supported by a mesh of steel cables. The ground beneath supported shade-tolerant vegetation.

Since its completion in November 1963, the Telescope had been used for radar astronomy and radio astronomy, and had been part of the Search for extraterrestrial intelligence (SETI) program. It was also used by NASA for Near-Earth object detection. Since around 2006, NSF funding support for the telescope had waned as the Foundation directed funds to newer instruments, though academics petitioned to the NSF and Congress to continue support for the telescope. Numerous hurricanes, including Hurricane Maria, had damaged parts of the telescope, straining the reduced budget.

Two cable breaks, one in August 2020 and a second in November 2020, threatened the structural integrity of the support structure for the suspended platform and damaged the dish. The NSF determined in November 2020 that it was safer to decommission the telescope rather than to try to repair it, but the telescope collapsed before a controlled demolition could be carried out. The remaining support cables from one tower failed around 7:56 a.m. local time on December 1, 2020, causing the receiver platform to fall into the dish and collapsing the telescope.

NASA led an extensive failure investigation and reported the findings, along with a technical bulletin with industry recommendations. The investigation concluded that "a combination of low socket design margin and a high percentage of sustained loading revealed an unexpected vulnerability to zinc creep and environments, resulting in long-term cumulative damage and progressive zinc/wire failure".

In 2024, the National Academies of Science, Engineering, and Medicine published their definitive report, "Failure Analysis of the Arecibo Observatory 305-Meter Telescope Collapse". The report cited many of the previous reports and findings, including the role of the high-energy output interacting with the zinc wire rope "brooming". It also raised the issue of the original design standards available in the 1980s versus the later advances in wind load engineering.

=== Additional telescopes ===
The Arecibo Observatory also has other facilities beyond the main telescope, including a 12-meter (39 ft) radio telescope intended for very-long-baseline interferometry (VLBI) with the main telescope; and a LIDAR facility whose research has continued since the main telescope's collapse.

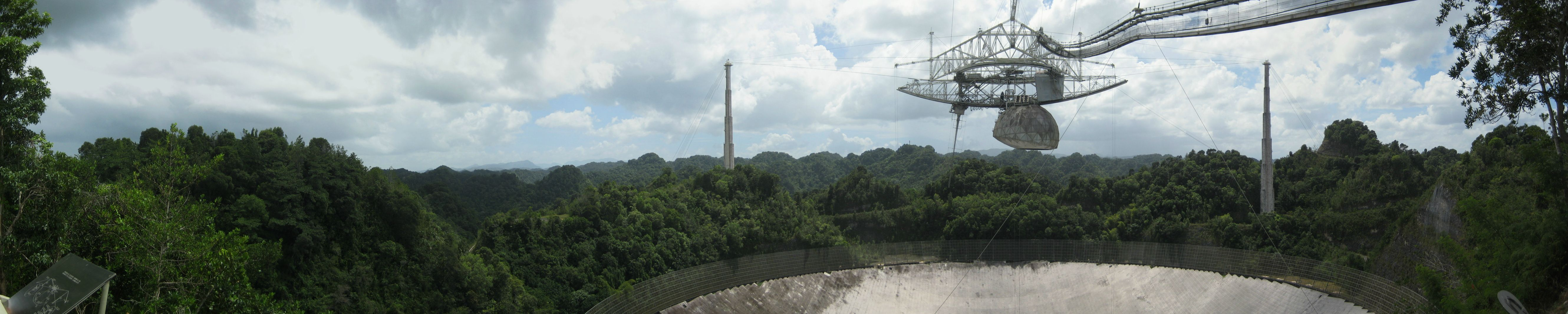
The Arecibo Radio Telescope as viewed from the observation deck, October 2013

=== Ángel Ramos Foundation Visitor Center ===
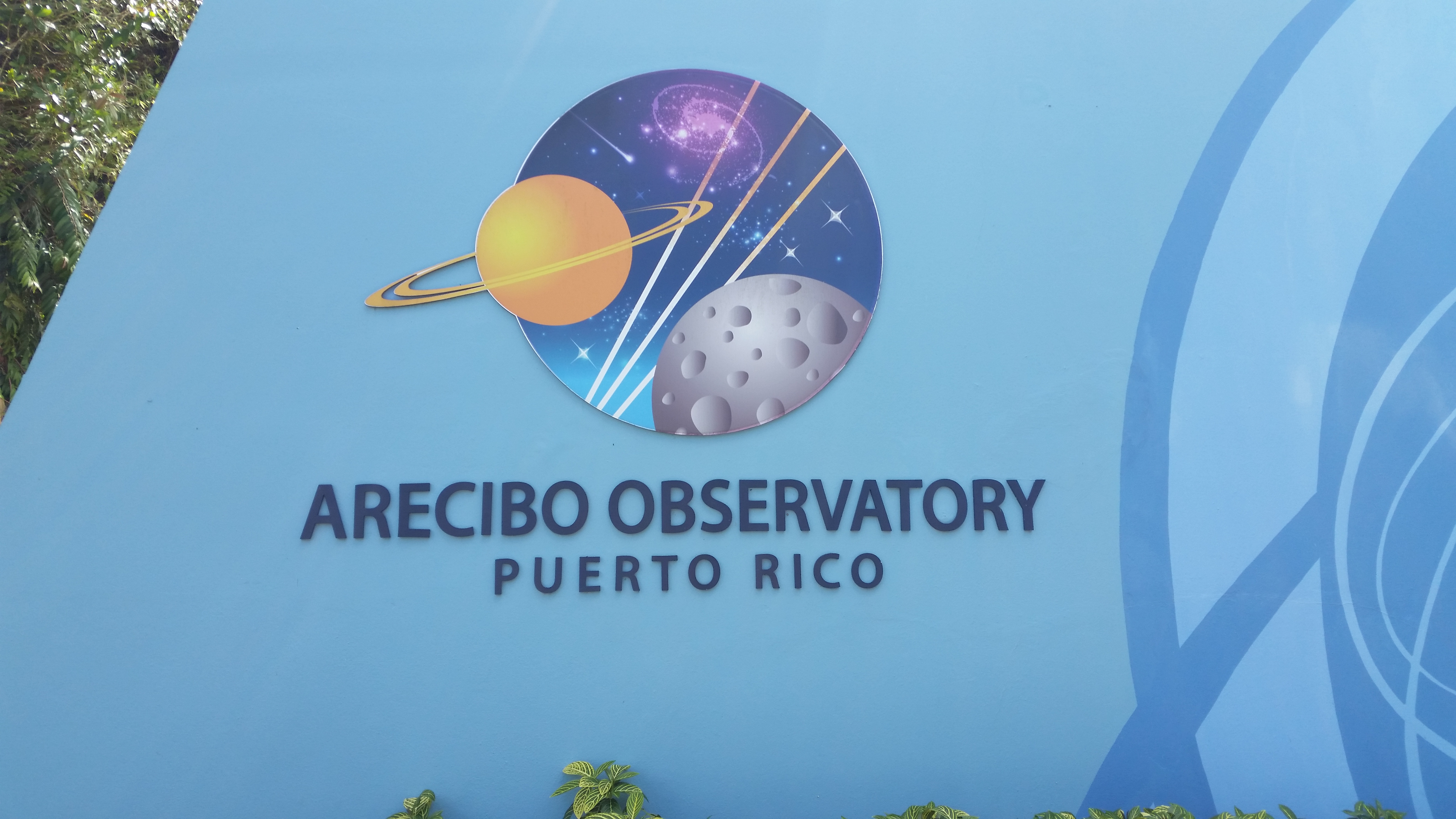
Logo of the observatory at the entrance gate

Opened in 1997, the Ángel Ramos Foundation Visitor Center features interactive exhibits and displays about the operations of the radio telescope, astronomy and atmospheric sciences. The center is named after the financial foundation that honors Ángel Ramos, owner of the El Mundo newspaper and founder of Telemundo. The Foundation provided half of the funds to build the Visitor Center, with the remainder received from private donations and Cornell University.

The center, in collaboration with the Caribbean Astronomical Society, hosts a series of Astronomical Nights throughout the year, which feature diverse discussions regarding exoplanets, astronomical phenomena, and discoveries (such as Comet ISON). The purposes of the center are to increase public interest in astronomy, the observatory's research successes, and space endeavors.

== List of directors ==
- 1960–1965: William E. Gordon
- 1965–1966: John W. Findlay
- 1966–1968: Frank Drake
- 1968–1971: Gordon Pettengill
- 1971–1973: Tor Hagfors
- 1973–1982: Harold D. Craft Jr.
- 1982–1987: Donald B. Campbell
- 1987–1988: Riccardo Giovanelli
- 1988–1992: Michael M. Davis
- 1992–2003: Daniel R. Altschuler
- 2003–2006: Sixto A. González
- 2006–2007: Timothy H. Hankins
- 2007–2008: Robert B. Kerr
- 2008–2011: Michael C. Nolan
- 2011–2015: Robert B. Kerr
- 2016–2022: Francisco Córdova
- 2022–2023: Olga Figueroa
- Arecibo C3, A STEM Education Center : 2023–present: Wanda Liz Díaz Merced

== See also ==
- Air Force Research Laboratory (US)
- Atacama Large Millimeter Array (Chile)
- Five-hundred-meter Aperture Spherical Telescope (China)
- List of radio telescopes
- RATAN-600 (Russia)
- UPRM Planetarium, projection room in the University of Puerto Rico
