= Harold "Tuffy" Stratton =

American football player and coach (1920–1994)

Harold Stratton
Biographical details
- Born: December 21, 1920; Tulsa, Oklahoma, U.S.
- Died: August 17, 1994 (aged 73); San Diego, California, U.S.

Playing career
- 1941: Northeastern State
- 1946–1947: Tulsa
- Position: Halfback

Coaching career (HC unless noted)
- 1949: Northeastern State (assistant)
- 1950–1953: Bacone
- 1954: Arkansas Tech (assistant)
- 1955: Southwest Missouri State
- 1956–1961: Northeastern State

Head coaching record
- Overall: 35–31–1 (college); 28–9–1 (junior college)
- Bowls: 0–1 (college); 0–0–1 (junior college)
- Tournaments: 2–0 (NAIA playoffs)

Accomplishments and honors

Championships
- 1 NAIA (1958); 1 OJCC (1952); 2 OCAC (1956, 1958)

Harold Lavern "Tuffy" Stratton (December 21, 1920 – August 17, 1994) was an American college football coach. He served as the head football coach at Southwest Missouri State University—now known as Missouri State University–1955 and at Northeastern Oklahoma State University from 1956 to 1961, where he led his team to the NAIA Football National Championship in 1958.

== Head coaching record ==
=== College ===
Year	Team	Overall	Conference	Standing	Bowl/playoffs
Southwest Missouri State Bears (Missouri Intercollegiate Athletics Association) (1955)
1955	Southwest Missouri State	2–6–1	1–4	T–5th	
Southwest Missouri State:		2–6–1	1–4		
Northeastern State Redmen (Oklahoma Collegiate Conference) (1956–1961)
1956	Northeastern State	8–2	4–1	T–1st	L Mineral Water Bowl
1957	Northeastern State	7–3	3–2	T–2nd	
1958	Northeastern State	11–0	6–0	1st	W NAIA Championship
1959	Northeastern State	3–6	2–4	5th	
1960	Northeastern State	1–8	0–6	7th	
1961	Northeastern State	3–6	2–4	T–5th	
Northeastern State:		33–25	17–17		
Total:		35–31–1			
National championship Conference title Conference division title or championship game berth

=== Junior college ===
Year	Team	Overall	Conference	Standing	Bowl/playoffs
Bacone Warriors () (1950)
1950	Bacone	5–5			
Bacone Warriors (Oklahoma Junior College Conference) (1951–1953)
1951	Bacone	8–1	4–1	2nd	
1952	Bacone	9–0–1	6–0	1st	T Junior Rose Bowl
1953	Bacone	6–3	4–2	3rd	
Bacone:		28–9–1			
Total:		28–9–1			
National championship Conference title Conference division title or championship game berth
