= 1956 San Diego Pioneers football team =

American college football season

1956 San Diego Pioneers football
- Conference: Independent
- Record: 2–3
- Head coach: Gil Kuhn (1st season)
- Home stadium: Balboa Stadium

The 1956 San Diego Pioneers football team represented the University of San Diego as an independent during the 1956 college football season, in the program's first season of competition. Led by Gil Kuhn in his first and only season as head coach, the Pioneers compiled a record of 2–3. Kuhn, who was captain of the 1936 USC Trojans football team and a United States Army Air Forces pilot during World War II, volunteered to coach the team.

== Schedule ==
Date	Opponent	Site	Result	Source
September 29	Air Force	San Diego, CA	L 0–46	
October 6	San Diego NTS	San Diego, CA	L 0–39	
October 13	Edwards Air Force Base		W 47–0	
November 3	New Mexico Military		W 14–12	
November 17	Arizona State–Flagstaff	Balboa Stadium; San Diego, CA	L 7–20	
