= 1962 Eastern Illinois Panthers football team =

American college football season

1962 Eastern Illinois Panthers football
- Conference: Interstate Intercollegiate Athletic Conference
- Record: 1–7 (0–4 IIAC)
- Head coach: Ralph Kohl (6th season)
- Home stadium: Lincoln Field

1962 Interstate Intercollegiate Athletic Conference football standings
	Conf.					Overall
Team	W		L		T	W		L		T
Central Michigan $	4	–	0	–	0	6	–	4	–	0
No. 9 Northern Illinois	3	–	1	–	0	8	–	2	–	0
Western Illinois	2	–	2	–	0	5	–	3	–	0
Illinois State Normal	1	–	3	–	0	5	–	4	–	0
Eastern Illinois	0	–	4	–	0	1	–	7	–	0
$ – Conference champion; Rankings from NAIA poll

The 1962 Eastern Illinois Panthers football team represented Eastern Illinois University as a member of the Interstate Intercollegiate Athletic Conference (IIAC) during the 1962 NCAA College Division football season. The team was led by sixth-year head coach Ralph Kohl and played their home games at Lincoln Field in Charleston, Illinois. The Panthers finished the season with a 1–7 record overall and an 0–4 record in conference play.

== Schedule ==
Date	Opponent	Site	Result	Attendance	Source
September 22	Indiana State*	Lincoln Field; Charleston, IL	W 13–0		
September 29	Illinois State Normal	Lincoln Field; Charleston, IL (rivalry)	L 0–18		
October 6	at Bradley*	Peoria Stadium; Peoria, IL	L 0–28		
October 13	at Northern Illinois	Glidden Field; DeKalb, IL	L 0–21		
October 20	Hope*	Lincoln Field; Charleston, IL	L 7–28	5,000	
October 27	at Eastern Michigan*	Briggs Field; Ypsilanti, MI	L 0–14		
November 3	at Western Illinois	Hanson Field; Macomb, IL	L 8–44		
November 10	Central Michigan	Lincoln Field; Charleston, IL	L 23–35	2,000	
*Non-conference game
