= 1962 Northern Illinois Huskies football team =

American college football season

1962 Northern Illinois Huskies football

Mineral Water Bowl, L 20–23 vs. Adams State
- Conference: Interstate Intercollegiate Athletic Conference
- Record: 8–2 (3–1 IIAC)
- Head coach: Howard Fletcher (7th season)
- MVP: George Bork
- Captain: Michael Henigan
- Home stadium: Glidden Field

1962 Interstate Intercollegiate Athletic Conference football standings
	Conf.					Overall
Team	W		L		T	W		L		T
Central Michigan $	4	–	0	–	0	6	–	4	–	0
No. 9 Northern Illinois	3	–	1	–	0	8	–	2	–	0
Western Illinois	2	–	2	–	0	5	–	3	–	0
Illinois State Normal	1	–	3	–	0	5	–	4	–	0
Eastern Illinois	0	–	4	–	0	1	–	7	–	0
$ – Conference champion; Rankings from NAIA poll

The 1962 Northern Illinois Huskies football team represented Northern Illinois University as a member of the Interstate Intercollegiate Athletic Conference (IIAC) during the 1962 NCAA College Division football season. Led by seventh-year head coach Howard Fletcher, the Huskies compiled an overall record of 8–2 with a mark of 3–1 in conference play, plaching second in the IIAC. Northern Illinois was invited to the Mineral Water Bowl, where they lost to Adams State. The team played home games at the 5,500-seat Glidden Field, located on the east end of campus, in DeKalb, Illinois.

== Schedule ==
Date	Opponent	Rank	Site	Result	Attendance	Source
September 15	Whitewater State*		Whitewater, WI	W 17–0		
September 22	Winona State*		Glidden Field; DeKalb, IL	W 27–0		
September 29	Northeast Missouri State*		Glidden Field; DeKalb, IL	W 37–8		
October 6	at Omaha*		Al F. Caniglia Field; Omaha, NE	W 13–7		
October 13	Eastern Illinois^{†}		Glidden Field; DeKalb, IL	W 21–0		
October 20	at Western Illinois	No. 3	Hanson Field; Macomb, IL	W 14–0		
October 27	Central Michigan	No. 2	Glidden Field; DeKalb, IL	L 27–35	9,000	
November 3	at Illinois State Normal	No. 7	McCormick Field; Normal, IL	W 48–7		
November 10	La Crosse State*	No. 4	Glidden Field; DeKalb, IL	W 50–7		
November 24	vs. Adams State*	No. 6	Roosevelt Field; Excelsior Springs, MO (Mineral Water Bowl)	L 20–23		
*Non-conference game; ^{†}Homecoming; Rankings from AP Poll released prior to the game
