= Thomas Christian Kavanagh =

American civil engineer and educator

- Born: August 17, 1912; New York City, U.S.
- Died: May 23, 1978 (aged 65); Florida, U.S.
- Education: City College of New York (BS, MS); New York University (MBA, PhD)
- Spouse: Kerstin Evelina Berglund (m. 1937)
- Children: 3
- Engineering career
- Projects: Arecibo Radio Telescope

Thomas Christian Kavanagh (August 17, 1912 – May 23, 1978) was a noted American civil engineer and educator, and a founding member of the National Academy of Engineering, serving as its first treasurer from 1964–1974.

== Biography ==
Kavanagh was born in New York City on August 17, 1912. His father, Patrick F. Kavanagh, was an Irish immigrant and laborer and electrical worker for a New York city streetcar company; his mother, Anna C. Unger, came from Germany. He attended the Technische Hochschule in Charlottenburg (now Technische Universität Berlin) for one year, received him B.S. and Master of Civil Engineering degrees from the City College of New York, and his Master of Business Administration degree in finance and science doctorate from New York University. He then started work as a structural designer for engineering firms in New York and Pennsylvania on railway and highway bridges, sanitary plants, power plants, electrical transmission towers, waterfront structures, floating docks, and refineries, and during World War II was an aircraft engineer.

After the war, he became assistant professor of civil engineering at New York University (NYU) for several years, then full professor at Pennsylvania State University and in 1948 head of its Structures Department. In 1952 he returned to NYU as chairman of its Department of Civil Engineering. In 1953 he began consulting for Praeger & Maguire, which was renamed Praeger-Kavanagh when he became partner, and later Praeger-Kavanagh-Waterbury. While consulting, he continued as adjunct professor at NYU until 1956, and at Columbia University thereafter. In 1975 Kavanagh joined Louis Berger International as vice president, and in 1976 he founded another consulting firm, Iffland Kavanagh Waterbury, remaining a partner until his death.

Kavanagh was responsible for several major engineering projects, including the Arecibo radio telescope in Puerto Rico, the Hawkins Point Floating Bridge on the St. Lawrence River, plans for the subway system of Caracas, and the Long Island Sound bridge crossing. He was a member of twenty professional societies, and chaired twenty different professional working groups. Among his many honors he received the Ernest E. Howard Award from the American Society of Civil Engineers; the David Steinman Medal for Structural Engineering from the City College of New York; the Gold Medal of the Architectural League of New York; and an Honorary Life Membership in the New York Academy of Sciences.

He married Kerstin Evelina Berglund in 1937. The couple had three children.

Kavanagh died in Florida on May 23, 1978.
