= 1962 Central Michigan Chippewas football team =

American college football season

1962 Central Michigan Chippewas football

IIAC champion
- Conference: Interstate Intercollegiate Athletic Conference
- Record: 6–4 (4–0 IIAC)
- Head coach: Kenneth Kelly (12th season)
- MVPs: Ralph Sofferdine; Larry Moore
- Home stadium: Alumni Field

1962 Interstate Intercollegiate Athletic Conference football standings
	Conf.					Overall
Team	W		L		T	W		L		T
Central Michigan $	4	–	0	–	0	6	–	4	–	0
No. 9 Northern Illinois	3	–	1	–	0	8	–	2	–	0
Western Illinois	2	–	2	–	0	5	–	3	–	0
Illinois State Normal	1	–	3	–	0	5	–	4	–	0
Eastern Illinois	0	–	4	–	0	1	–	7	–	0
$ – Conference champion; Rankings from NAIA poll

The 1962 Central Michigan Chippewas football team represented Central Michigan University in the Interstate Intercollegiate Athletic Conference (IIAC) during the 1962 NCAA College Division football season. In their 12th season under head coach Kenneth Kelly, the Chippewas compiled a 6–4 record (4–0 against IIAC opponents), won the IIAC championship, and outscored their opponents by a combined total of 209 to 195.

The team's statistical leaders included quarterback Dick Moffit with 1,109 passing yards, Bill Shuple with 640 rushing yards, and halfback Gary Finnin with 361 receiving yards. Offensive guard Ralph Sofferdine and halfback Larry Moore received the team's most valuable player award. Five Central Michigan players (Moffit, Sofferdine, Moore, and defensive tackles George Alward and Uwe Wiese) received first-team honors on the All-IIAC team.

== Schedule ==
Date	Opponent	Site	Result	Attendance	Source
September 8	vs. Northern Michigan*	Memorial Field; Saginaw, MI	L 12–20	8,000	
September 15	at Western Michigan*	Waldo Stadium; Kalamazoo, MI (rivalry)	L 0–28	11,000	
September 22	Youngstown State*	Alumni Field; Mount Pleasant, MI	L 7–14	5,300	
September 29	Southern Illinois*	Alumni Field; Mount Pleasant, MI	L 6–43	4,800–5,000	
October 6	at Western Illinois	Hanson Field; Macomb, IL	W 17–8	6,000	
October 13	Illinois State Normal	Alumni Field; Mount Pleasant, MI	W 46–8	4,800	
October 20	Eastern Michigan*^{†}	Alumni Field; Mount Pleasant, MI (rivalry)	W 24–0	4,000	
October 27	at No. 2 Northern Illinois	Glidden Field; DeKalb, IL	W 35–27	9,000	
November 3	Hillsdale*	Alumni Field; Mount Pleasant, MI	W 9–0	4,025	
November 10	at Eastern Illinois	Lincoln Field; °Charleston, IL	W 35–23	2,000	
*Non-conference game; ^{†}Homecoming; Rankings from AP Poll released prior to the game

== See also ==
- 1962 in Michigan
