= 1958 Northeastern State Redmen football team =

American college football season

1958 Northeastern State Redmen football

NAIA national champion OCC champion

Holiday Bowl, W 19–13 Arizona State–Flagstaff
- Conference: Oklahoma Collegiate Conference
- Record: 11–0 (6–0 OCC)
- Head coach: Harold "Tuffy" Stratton (3rd season)
- Home stadium: Gable Field

1958 Oklahoma Collegiate Conference football standings
	Conf.					Overall
Team	W		L		T	W		L		T
Northeastern State $^	6	–	0	–	0	11	–	0	–	0
Central State (OK)	4	–	2	–	0	5	–	4	–	0
NW Oklahoma State	3	–	3	–	0	6	–	3	–	0
Langston	3	–	3	–	0	4	–	4	–	0
SE Oklahoma State	2	–	4	–	0	3	–	5	–	0
SW Oklahoma State	2	–	4	–	0	2	–	6	–	1
East Central	1	–	5	–	0	2	–	7	–	0
$ – Conference champion; ^ – NAIA playoff participant

The 1958 Northeastern State Redmen football team represented Northeastern State University as a member of the Oklahoma Collegiate Conference (OCC) during the 1958 NAIA football season. In their third season under head coach Harold "Tuffy" Stratton, the Redmen compiled a perfect 11–0 record (6–0 against OCC opponents) and won the OCC championship. In the post-season, they defeated St. Benedict's in the NAIA playoffs and Arizona State–Flagstaff in the Holiday Bowl to win the NAIA national championship.

Guard Claude Billingsley won NAIA All-America honors. He was also named the outstanding lineman of 1958 in the OCC. Halfback Dan Smith led the OCC in scoring and was named the OCC's outstanding back of 1958. Seven Northeastern State players received first-team honors on the 1958 All-Oklahoma Collegiate Conference teams selected by the seven conference coaches: Billingsley; Smith (unanimous choice); quarterback Frankie Phelps (unanimous choice); end Charles Moore; tackle Joe Kiger; center Lynn Burris; and fullback Deloyd Reed. Three others received second-team honors: end Fred Hood; tackle James Barrett; and guard Roger Wickersham.

The team played its home games at Gable Field in Tahlequah, Oklahoma.

== Schedule ==
Date	Opponent	Site	Result	Attendance	Source
September 13	at Missouri Mines*	Rolla, MO	W 20–3		
September 20	at Saint Joseph (IN)*	Rensselaer, IN	W 25–14		
September 26	at Northwestern Oklahoma State	Alva, OK	W 40–12		
October 4	Southeastern Oklahoma State	Gable Field; Tahlequah, OK	W 34–0	3,500	
October 11	at East Central	Ada, OK	W 33–7		
October 18	Southwestern Oklahoma State^{†}	Gable Field; Tahlequah, OK	W 34–14		
October 25	Langston	Gable Field; Tahlequah, OK	W 28–8		
October 31	at Central State (OK)	Central Field; Edmond, OK	W 28–8		
November 15	at Pittsburg State*	Brandenburg Stadium; Pittsburg, KS	W 40–3		
December 6	vs. St. Benedict's*	Skelly Field; Tulsa, OK (NAIA Semifinal)	W 19–14	8,000	
December 20	vs. Arizona State–Flagstaff*	Al Lang Field; St. Petersburg, FL (Holiday Bowl—NAIA Championship Game)	W 19–13	8,628	
*Non-conference game; ^{†}Homecoming
