= Lumberjack Stadium =

Multipurpose stadium in Arizona

- Interactive map of Lumberjack Stadium
- Full name: Max Spilsbury Field at Lumberjack Stadium
- Address: 175 E. Pine Knoll Drive
- Location: Northern Arizona University; Flagstaff, Arizona
- Coordinates: 35°11′22″N 111°39′2″W
- Elevation: 6,880 feet (2,100 m) AMSL
- Owner: Northern Arizona University
- Operator: Northern Arizona University
- Capacity: 1,000; 8,350 (1975); 3,000 (1957)
- Surface: Natural grass

Construction
- Built: 1957; 69 years ago
- Renovated: 2011

Tenants
- NAU Lumberjacks women's soccer (NCAA); NAU Lumberjacks cross country (NCAA)

Lumberjack Stadium is a 1,000-seat multi-purpose stadium in the southwestern United States, located on the campus of Northern Arizona University in Flagstaff, Arizona. It is home to the NAU Lumberjacks women's soccer, cross country, and outdoor track and field teams.

== History ==
Opened in 1957, the Lumberjacks football team played on the field from 1960 through the season opener in 1977, then moved to the new Walkup Skydome. The seating capacity in 1975 was approximately 8,350.

=== Renovation ===
In 2011, the stadium went through a major $106 million renovation that connected it to the school's new Health and Learning Center (HLC). The new modern facilities for the stadium included 1,000 covered seats, newly painted field, offices, locker rooms, concessions, and a resurfaced track. The field itself was renamed Max Spilsbury Field at Lumberjack Stadium.
