= Frontier Conference (1940–1962) =

Defunct US sports league

- Conference: NCAA; NAIA
- Founded: 1940
- Folded: 1962
- No. of teams: 9 (Football)
- Region: Southwest

Locations

The Frontier Conference, known as the New Mexico Conference and New Mexico Intercollegiate Conference from 1940 to 1955, was an intercollegiate athletic conference composed of member schools located in the states of Arizona, Colorado, New Mexico, Oklahoma, and Texas. The league existed from 1940 to 1962.

== Membership ==
=== Former members ===
- The following is an incomplete list of the membership of the Frontier Conference.

Institution	Location	Founded	Type	Nickname	Joined	Left	Colors	Current conference
Adams State College	Alamosa, Colorado	1921	Public	Grizzlies	1946	1955	Green & White	RMAC (Note: Currently an NCAA Division II athletic conference.)
Arizona State College	Flagstaff, Arizona	1899	Public	Lumberjacks	1953	1962	Blue & Gold	Big Sky (Note: Currently an NCAA Division I athletic conference.)
Eastern New Mexico University	Portales, New Mexico	1927	Public	Greyhounds	1940	1953	Green & Silver	Lone Star
New Mexico Highlands University	Las Vegas, New Mexico	1893	Public	Cowboys and Cowgirls	1940	1962	Purple & White	RMAC
New Mexico Military Institute	Roswell, New Mexico	1891	Public	Broncos	1940	1957	Red & Black	WJCAC (Note: Currently an NJCAA Division I athletic conference.), SWJCFC (Note: Currently an NJCAA Division I athletic football conference.)
New Mexico State Teachers' College	Silver City, New Mexico	1893	Public	Mustangs	1940	1962	Royal Purple & Golden Yellow	Lone Star
Panhandle Agricultural and Mechanical College	Goodwell, Oklahoma	1909	Public	Aggies	1940	1950	Crimson & Blue	Sooner (Note: Currently an NAIA athletic conference.)
St. Michael's College	Santa Fe, New Mexico	1859	Roman Catholic	Horsemen	1948	1950	Light Navy & White	Defunct
Sul Ross State College	Alpine, Texas	1917	Public	Lobos	1946	1949	Scarlet & Grey	Lone Star

=== Membership timeline ===
NMC members Frontier members

== Football championships and postseason appearances ==
New Mexico Intercollegiate Conference football championships
Season	Champion	Conference record	Overall record
1940	New Mexico State Teachers'	4–0	4–3
1941	New Mexico Military	4–0	6–1
1942	New Mexico State Teachers'	1–0	2–2
1943–1945	Competition suspended during World War II		
1946	Adams State	4–0	5–1
1947	Sul Ross	5–0	6–3
1948	Sul Ross	5–0	10–0–1
1949	Sul Ross	5–0	7–3
1950	Eastern New Mexico	5–1	5–5
1951	Eastern New Mexico	5–0	8–1
1952 (co-champions)	Eastern New Mexico	4–1	7–1–1
1952 (co-champions)	Panhandle A&M	4–1	7–3
1953	Panhandle A&M	6–0	8–1–1
1954	Panhandle A&M	5–0	6–3

Frontier Conference football championships
Season	Champion	Conference record	Overall record
1955 (co-champions)	Adams State	4–1	6–4
1955 (co-champions)	New Mexico Military	4–1	5–3
1956 (co-champions)	Arizona State–Flagstaff	3–0	8–2
1956 (co-champions)	New Mexico Military	3–0	6–3
1957	Arizona State–Flagstaff	3–0	8–1
1958	Arizona State–Flagstaff	3–0	11–1
1959	Arizona State–Flagstaff	3–0	6–2–1
1960 (co-champions)	Arizona State–Flagstaff	2–0–1	6–3–2
1960 (co-champions)	New Mexico Highlands	2–0–1	6–2–1
1961	Arizona State–Flagstaff	1–0–1	3–5–1
1962	Arizona State–Flagstaff	2–0	6–4

National playoff and bowl games
Conference team	Opponent	Result	Score	Location
1949 Tangerine Bowl
Sul Ross	Murray State	Tie	21–21	Orlando, Florida
1958 NAIA Semifinal
Arizona State–Flagstaff	Gustavus Adolphus	Win	41–12	Tucson, Arizona
1958 NAIA Championship (Holiday Bowl)
Arizona State–Flagstaff	Northeastern State	Loss	13–19	St. Petersburg, Florida

== See also ==
- List of defunct college football conferences
