= New Mexico Highlands Cowboys and Cowgirls =

Athletic teams representing New Mexico Highlands University

- University: New Mexico Highlands University
- Nickname: Cowboys and Cowgirls
- NCAA: Division II
- Conference: Rocky Mountain Athletic Conference
- Athletic director: Scott Noble
- Location: Las Vegas, New Mexico
- Varsity teams: 11
- Football stadium: Sanchez Family Stadium
- Basketball arena: John A. Wilson Complex
- Baseball stadium: Brandt Field
- Softball stadium: NMHU Softball Complex
- Soccer stadium: Off campus facility
- Colors: Purple and white
- Website: nmhuathletics.com

The New Mexico Highlands Cowboys and Cowgirls are the athletic teams that represent New Mexico Highlands University, located in Las Vegas, New Mexico, in NCAA Division II intercollegiate sports. The Cowboys and Cowgirls compete as members of the Rocky Mountain Athletic Conference for all 11 varsity sports.

== History ==
The Men's Cross-Country team placed 10th in the nation at the 1998 NCAA Division II National Championship. In the 2008–09 season, the NMHU men's basketball team broke the NCAA record for turnaround wins in all divisions. They went from 1–28 to 20–8 and winning the West Division Regular Season Championship of the RMAC. They were led by head coach Joe Harge and tri-captains Chris Dunn, Roman "Electric" Andrade, and Rashad Peterson. In 2010, NMHU wrestler Seth Wright won the NCAA Division II National Championship at 125 lbs.

== Varsity sports ==
Men's sports

- Baseball
- Basketball
- Cross Country
- Football
- Wrestling

Women's sports

- Basketball
- Cross Country
- Soccer
- Softball
- Track & Field
- Volleyball

== National championships ==
=== Team ===
Sport	Association	Division	Year	Runner-up	Score	Head Coach
Baseball (1)	NAIA (1)	Single (1)	1967	Glassboro State	6–1	Jim Marshall

== Notable Accomplishments ==
- 1968 Football perfect 9-0
- Hector Hernandez 1987 NAIA Heavy Weight National Champion

== Notable alumni ==
- Charlie Cowan, NFL – All Pro Tackle
- Bill Dinwiddie, NBA player
- Carl Garrett, AFL/NFL – 1969 AFL Rookie of the Year
- Len Garrett, NFL player
- Eddie Guerrero (1967–2005), WWE wrestler
- Lionel Taylor, AFL/NFL – Leading Pass Receiver
- Don Woods, NFL Player
- Kevon Williams, USA Rugby 7s
- Anthony Edwards, NFL player
