= Western New Mexico Mustangs =

- University: Western New Mexico University
- Conference: LSC (primary)
- NCAA: Division II
- Athletic director: Scott Noble
- Location: Silver City, New Mexico
- Varsity teams: 13 (6 men's, 7 women's)
- Football stadium: Ben Altamirano Field
- Basketball arena: Drag's Court
- Softball stadium: Mustang Softball Field
- Mascot: Rawhide
- Nickname: Mustangs
- Colors: Purple and gold
- Website: wnmumustangs.com
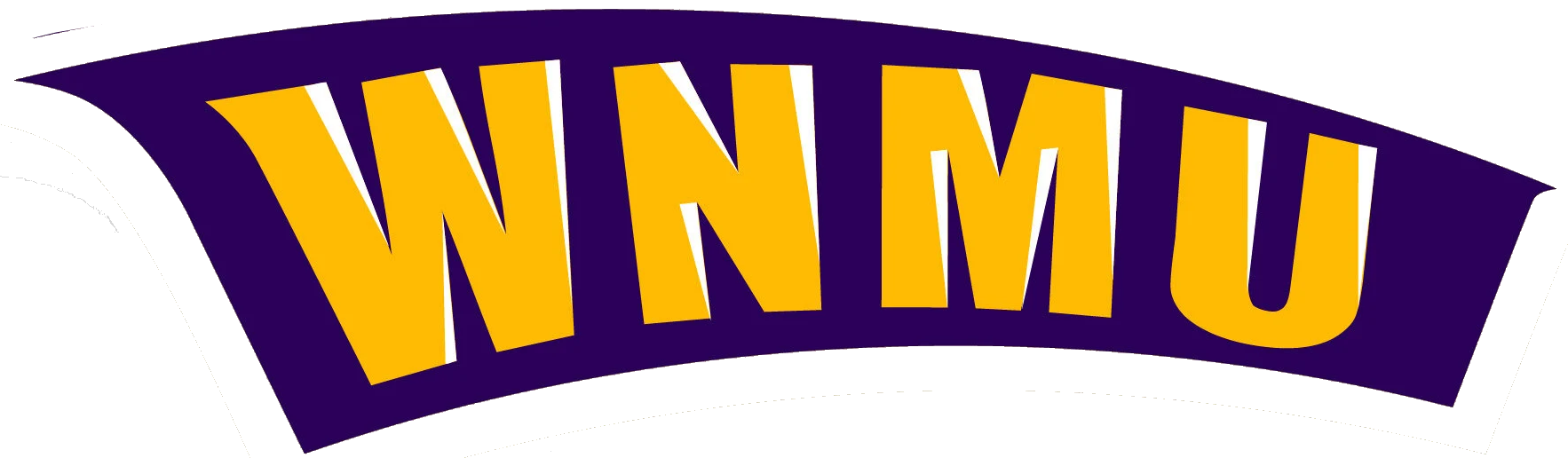

The Western New Mexico Mustangs are the athletic teams that represent Western New Mexico University, located in Silver City, New Mexico, in NCAA Division II intercollegiate sports. The Mustangs are members of the Lone Star Conference after previously being members of the Rocky Mountain Athletic Conference.

== Varsity sports ==
=== Teams ===
Men's sports
- Basketball
- Cross Country
- Football
- Golf
- Tennis
- Track & Field

Women's sports

- Basketball
- Cross Country
- Golf
- Softball
- Tennis
- Track & Field
- Volleyball

=== Golf ===
The WNMU Ladies Golf Team led the Rocky Mountain Athletic Conference (RMAC) in the 2007–2008 season. Senior Tina Bickford was named RMAC Player of the Year and the team finished the year as the regular season and tournament champions. In 2013, the Ladies were repeat champions.

=== Tennis ===
The men's tennis team has been the RMAC Champions each year since 2009. In 2013, the Lady Mustang tennis teams earned RMAC Champion honors.
