= List of passes of the Rocky Mountains =

The Rocky Mountains of North America include more than one thousand named mountain passes (topographic saddle points).

== Table ==
Selected mountain passes of the Rocky Mountains
| Pass | Region | Elevation | WGS84 | Access |
|---|---|---|---|---|
| Abbot Pass | Alberta; British Columbia | 2922 m 9,587 ft | 51°21′50″N 116°17′14″W | Foot trail between Banff National Park and Yoho National Park |
| Akamina Pass | Alberta; British Columbia | 1783 m 5,850 ft | 49°01′28″N 114°03′16″W | Foot trail in Waterton Lakes National Park |
| Allenby Pass | Alberta | 2454 m 8,051 ft | 50°57′53″N 115°34′10″W | Foot trail in Banff National Park |
| Amiskwi Pass | British Columbia | 1996 m 6,549 ft | 51°37′00″N 116°40′00″W | Foot trail in Yoho National Park |
| Apache Pass | New Mexico | 2832 m 9,291 ft | 36°23′07″N 105°19′34″W | Foot trail in Carson National Forest |
| Arapaho Pass | Colorado | 3629 m 11,906 ft | 40°00′52″N 105°40′41″W | Foot trail in Indian Peaks Wilderness |
| Arapaho Pass | Colorado | 2729 m 8,953 ft | 40°23′06″N 106°28′21″W | Primitive road |
| Argentine Pass | Colorado | 4025 m 13,205 ft | 39°37′31″N 105°46′57″W | Primitive road in Arapaho National Forest (Highest road over the Continental Divide in North America) |
| Assiniboine Pass | Alberta; British Columbia | 2179 m 7,149 ft | 50°55′35″N 115°36′32″W | Foot trail between Banff National Park and Mount Assiniboine Provincial Park |
| Astoria Pass | Alberta | 2362 m 7,749 ft | 52°42′27″N 118°08′33″W | Foot trail in Jasper National Park |
| Athabasca Pass | Alberta; British Columbia | 1753 m 5,751 ft | 52°22′56″N 118°11′24″W | Foot trail in Jasper National Park |
| Avalanche Pass | Colorado | 3687 m 12,096 ft | 39°06′41″N 107°08′38″W | Foot trail in White River National Forest |
| Avalanche Pass | Alberta; British Columbia | 1570 m 5,151 ft | 53°36′58″N 119°54′39″W | Foot trail |
| Aylmer Pass | Alberta | 2301 m 7,549 ft | 51°19′04″N 115°27′19″W | Foot trail in Banff National Park |
| Badger Pass | Montana | 2059 m 6,755 ft | 45°14′02″N 112°57′01″W | in Beaverhead National Forest |
| Badger Pass | Montana | 1924 m 6,312 ft | 48°07′50″N 113°02′15″W | Foot trail in Bob Marshall Wilderness |
| Badger Pass | Alberta | 2545 m 8,350 ft | 51°24′39″N 115°53′36″W | Foot trail in Banff National Park |
| Bald Mountain Pass | Utah | 3208 m 10,525 ft | 40°41′18″N 110°53′52″W | in Wasatch National Forest |
| Baldy Pass | Alberta | 1990 m 6,529 ft | 50°59′15″N 115°01′55″W | Foot trail in Kananaskis Country |
| Balfour Pass | Alberta; British Columbia | 2454 m 8,051 ft | 51°35′14″N 116°28′19″W | Foot trail between Banff National Park and Yoho National Park |
| Ball Pass | Alberta; British Columbia | 2210 m 7,251 ft | 51°07′35″N 115°59′19″W | Foot trail between Banff National Park and Kootenay National Park |
| Banner Summit | Idaho | 2144 m 7,034 ft | 44°18′23″N 115°13′54″W | between Boise National Forest and Challis National Forest |
| Bannock Pass | Idaho; Montana | 2342 m 7,684 ft | 44°48′52″N 113°16′19″W | between Salmon National Forest and Beaverhead National Forest (Gilmore and Pittsburgh Railroad 1910-1939) |
| Battle Pass | Wyoming | 2560 m 8,400 ft | 39°34′55″N 108°57′09″W | Wyoming Highway 70 |
| Baxter Pass | Colorado | 3021 m 9,911 ft | 39°34′55″N 108°57′09″W | Gravel road |
| Bear Lake Summit | Utah | 2383 m 7,818 ft | 41°55′33″N 111°28′24″W | U.S. Route 89 in Utah |
| Beartooth Pass | Wyoming | 3337 m 10,948 ft | 44°58′09″N 109°28′18″W | in Shoshone National Forest |
| Beaver Pass | British Columbia | 1844 m 6,050 ft | 53°07′00″N 121°54′00″W | Foot trail |
| Beaverdam Pass | Alberta; British Columbia | 1509 m 4,951 ft | 53°34′36″N 119°53′20″W | Foot trail |
| Berthoud Pass | Colorado | 3452 m 11,325 ft | 39°47′54″N 105°46′40″W | in Arapaho National Forest |
| Bess Pass | Alberta; British Columbia | 1620 m 5,315 ft | 53°19′48″N 119°21′02″W | Foot trail in Jasper National Park |
| Biddle Pass | British Columbia | 2575 m 8,448 ft | 51°20′00″N 116°20′00″W | Foot trail between Kootenay National Park and Yoho National Park |
| Big Hole Pass | Montana | 2151 m 7,057 ft | 45°32′59″N 113°49′13″W | Montana Secondary Highway 278 |
| Big Mountain Pass | Utah | 2264 m 7,428 ft | 40°49′43″N 111°39′14″W | in Wasatch National Forest |
| Bigelow Divide | Colorado | 2866 m 9,403 ft | 38°05′55″N 105°07′40″W | in San Isabel National Forest |
| Birdwood Pass | Alberta | 2454 m 8,051 ft | 50°46′40″N 115°22′35″W | Foot trail between Banff National Park and Kananaskis Country |
| Black Bear Pass | Colorado | 3914 m 12,840 ft | 37°53′58″N 107°44′32″W | San Juan National Forest Road 648 (primitive) |
| Black Powder Pass | Colorado | 3703 m 12,149 ft | 39°25′25″N 105°57′19″W | Foot trail between Arapaho National Forest and Pike National Forest |
| Black Sage Pass | Colorado | 2963 m 9,721 ft | 38°29′26″N 106°27′06″W | Primitive road |
| Blue Lake Pass | Colorado | 3953 m 12,969 ft | 37°59′52″N 107°47′43″W | Foot trail in Uncompahgre National Forest |
| Blue Mesa Summit | Colorado | 2653 m 8,704 ft | 38°23′10″N 107°26′01″W | (Lake Fork and Uncompahgre Toll Road 1878) |
| Bobcat Pass | New Mexico | 2998 m 9,836 ft | 36°42′00″N 105°20′23″W | in Carson National Forest |
| Boreas Pass | Colorado | 3505 m 11,499 ft | 39°24′40″N 105°58′10″W | Park County Road 33 in Pike National Forest to Summit County Road 10 in Arapaho National Forest (Denver, South Park and Pacific Railroad 1882) |
| Boulder Pass | Alberta | 2332 m 7,651 ft | 51°29′08″N 116°04′38″W | Foot trail in Banff National Park |
| Boulder-Grand Pass | Colorado | 3681 m 12,077 ft | 40°13′28″N 105°40′09″W | Foot trail in Rocky Mountain National Park |
| Bow Pass | Alberta | 2069 m 6,788 ft | 51°43′12″N 116°29′40″W | Icefields Parkway in Banff National Park |
| Bozeman Pass | Montana | 1738 m 5,702 ft | 45°40′02″N 110°48′28″W | Interstate 90 in Montana U.S. Route 191 Montana Rail Link |
| Bridger Pass | Wyoming | 2313 m 7,588 ft | 41°33′02″N 107°25′51″W | (Stansbury Expedition 1849, Cherokee Trail 1849, Overland Trail 1861) |
| Browns Pass | Colorado | 3657 m 11,998 ft | 38°51′14″N 106°21′34″W | Foot trail in Collegiate Peaks Wilderness |
| Buchanan Pass | Colorado | 3610 m 11,844 ft | 40°07′52″N 105°37′49″W | Foot trail in Indian Peaks Wilderness |
| Buckskin Pass | Colorado | 3778 m 12,395 ft | 39°06′07″N 106°59′31″W | Foot trail in Maroon Bells-Snowmass Wilderness |
| Buffalo Pass | Colorado | 3138 m 10,295 ft | 40°32′37″N 106°41′06″W | Jackson County Road 24 and Routt County Road 38 in Routt National Forest |
| Buller Pass | Alberta | 2454 m 8,051 ft | 50°52′50″N 115°16′25″W | Foot trail in Kananaskis Country |
| Burgess Pass | British Columbia | 2179 m 7,149 ft | 51°26′00″N 116°29′00″W | Foot trail in Yoho National Park |
| Burstall Pass | Alberta | 2362 m 7,749 ft | 50°45′42″N 115°22′32″W | Foot trail between Banff National Park and Kananaskis Country |
| Bush Pass | Alberta; British Columbia | 2393 m 7,851 ft | 51°47′54″N 116°58′08″W | Foot trail in Banff National Park |
| Byng Pass | Alberta | 2380 m 7,808 ft | 53°19′22″N 118°56′28″W | Foot trail in Jasper National Park |
| Cabin Pass | British Columbia | 1722 m 5,650 ft | 49°08′00″N 114°44′00″W | Foot trail |
| California Pass | Colorado | 3950 m 12,960 ft | 37°54′46″N 107°36′32″W | Primitive road |
| Cameron Pass | Colorado | 3124 m 10,249 ft | 40°31′15″N 105°53′33″W | between Roosevelt National Forest and State Forest State Park |
| Campus Pass | Alberta | 2240 m 7,349 ft | 52°37′56″N 118°08′18″W | Foot trail in Jasper National Park |
| Canoe Pass | Alberta; British Columbia | 2057 m 6,749 ft | 52°25′33″N 118°14′19″W | Foot trail in Jasper National Park |
| Carcajou Pass | Alberta; British Columbia | 1570 m 5,151 ft | 53°13′49″N 119°16′55″W | Foot trail between Jasper National Park and Mount Robson Provincial Park |
| Caribou Pass | Colorado | 3598 m 11,804 ft | 40°01′12″N 105°41′27″W | Foot trail in Indian Peaks Wilderness |
| Carnero Pass | Colorado | 3099 m 10,166 ft | 38°00′16″N 106°25′50″W | Gravel road in Rio Grande National Forest |
| Casket Pass | Alberta; British Columbia | 1631 m 5,351 ft | 53°46′35″N 119°55′49″W | Foot trail |
| Cataract Pass | Alberta | 2484 m 8,150 ft | 52°13′14″N 117°01′51″W | Foot trail between Jasper National Park and White Goat Wilderness Area |
| Centre Pass | Alberta; British Columbia | 1989 m 6,526 ft | 53°00′48″N 118°39′16″W | Foot trail |
| Cerro Summit | Colorado | 2426 m 7,958 ft | 38°26′38″N 107°38′29″W | (Denver & Rio Grande Railroad 1882) |
| Chalk Creek Pass | Colorado | 3700 m 12,139 ft | 38°36′23″N 106°21′02″W | Foot trail in San Isabel National Forest |
| Chief Joseph Pass | Idaho; Montana | 2210 m 7,251 ft | 45°41′05″N 113°55′59″W | in Salmon National Forest to in Beaverhead National Forest |
| Cinnamon Pass | Colorado | 3845 m 12,615 ft | 37°56′02″N 107°32′16″W | Primitive road |
| Citadel Pass | Alberta; British Columbia | 2362 m 7,749 ft | 51°01′13″N 115°42′37″W | Foot trail in Banff National Park |
| Clearwater Pass | Alberta | 2332 m 7,651 ft | 51°43′23″N 116°16′32″W | Foot trail in Banff National Park |
| Cline Pass | Alberta | 2380 m 7,808 ft | 52°14′31″N 117°00′03″W | Foot trail in White Goat Wilderness Area |
| Coal Bank Pass | Colorado | 3234 m 10,610 ft | 37°42′02″N 107°46′37″W | in San Juan National Forest |
| Cochetopa Pass | Colorado | 3109 m 10,200 ft | 38°09′46″N 106°36′00″W | Saguache County Road NN14 between Gunnison National Forest and Rio Grande National Forest |
| Coffeepot Pass | Colorado | 3879 m 12,726 ft | 38°59′32″N 106°54′11″W | Foot trail in Maroon Bells-Snowmass Wilderness |
| Colonel Pass | Alberta; British Columbia | 1874 m 6,148 ft | 53°04′20″N 118°46′10″W | Foot trail between Jasper National Park and Mount Robson Provincial Park |
| Colter Pass | Montana | 2453 m 8,048 ft | 45°01′36″N 109°53′27″W | Beartooth Highway |
| Columbine Pass | Colorado | 3863 m 12,674 ft | 37°35′56″N 107°36′12″W | Foot trail in San Juan National Forest |
| Consolation Pass | Alberta | 2453 m 8,048 ft | 51°17′00″N 116°07′00″W | Foot trail in Banff National Park |
| Conundrum Pass | Colorado | 3895 m 12,779 ft | 39°00′26″N 106°54′34″W | Foot trail in White River National Forest |
| Cony Pass | Colorado | 3785 m 12,418 ft | 40°10′41″N 105°39′58″W | Foot trail in Rocky Mountain National Park |
| Copper Pass | Colorado | 3813 m 12,510 ft | 38°59′58″N 106°54′55″W | Foot trail between Gunnison National Forest and White River National Forest |
| Copton Pass | Alberta | 2210 m 7,251 ft | 53°56′51″N 119°36′23″W | Foot trail |
| Coral Pass | British Columbia | 2515 m 8,251 ft | 50°29′58″N 115°08′25″W | Foot trail |
| Cordova Pass | Colorado | 3428 m 11,248 ft | 37°20′54″N 105°01′29″W | Gravel road |
| Cottonwood Pass | Colorado | 3694 m 12,119 ft | 38°49′40″N 106°24′33″W | Chaffee County Road 306 in San Isabel National Forest to Gunnison County Road 209 in Gunnison National Forest (Highest paved road over the Continental Divide in North America) |
| Craig Pass | Wyoming | 2537 m 8,323 ft | 44°26′30″N 110°43′11″W | Grand Loop Road in Yellowstone National Park |
| Crowfoot Pass | Alberta | 2362 m 7,749 ft | 51°37′30″N 116°23′55″W | Foot trail in Banff National Park |
| Crowsnest Pass | Alberta; British Columbia | 1358 m 4,455 ft | 49°37′41″N 114°40′31″W | (Canadian Pacific Railway 1898) |
| Cucharas Pass | Colorado | 3029 m 9,938 ft | 37°19′13″N 105°04′25″W | in San Isabel National Forest |
| Cumberland Pass | Colorado | 3668 m 12,034 ft | 38°41′21″N 106°29′03″W | Gravel road in Gunnison National Forest |
| Cumbres Pass | Colorado | 3054 m 10,020 ft | 37°01′14″N 106°27′00″W | (Denver & Rio Grande Railroad 1881) |
| Currant Creek Pass | Colorado | 2890 m 9,482 ft | 38°50′13″N 105°38′10″W | Colorado State Highway Route 9 |
| Dallas Divide | Colorado | 2738 m 8,983 ft | 38°05′40″N 107°53′18″W | (Rio Grande Southern Railroad 1890) |
| Daniels Pass | Utah | 2435 m 7,989 ft | 40°17′50″N 111°15′08″W | U.S. Route 40 in Utah |
| Dead Indian Pass | Wyoming | 2400 m 7,874 ft | 44°44′37″N 109°23′06″W | in Shoshone National Forest |
| Deadman Pass | Alberta; British Columbia | 1600 m 5,249 ft | 49°42′21″N 114°39′38″W | Foot trail |
| Deception Pass | Alberta | 2475 m 8,120 ft | 51°29′47″N 116°03′42″W | Foot trail in Banff National Park |
| Deer Lodge Pass | Montana | 1805 m 5,922 ft | 45°53′00″N 112°40′18″W | Interstate 15 Union Pacific Railroad |
| Dennis Pass | British Columbia | 2271 m 7,451 ft | 51°22′00″N 116°27′00″W | Foot trail in Yoho National Park |
| Denver Pass | Colorado | 3934 m 12,907 ft | 37°57′17″N 107°33′43″W | Trace |
| Devils Gap | Alberta | 1524 m 5,000 ft | 51°16′52″N 115°10′24″W | Foot trail in Banff National Park |
| Dolomite Pass | Alberta | 2484 m 8,150 ft | 51°41′47″N 116°23′02″W | Foot trail in Banff National Park |
| Dormer Pass | Alberta | 2420 m 7,940 ft | 51°26′35″N 115°34′10″W | Foot trail in Banff National Park |
| Douglas Pass | Colorado | 2501 m 8,205 ft | 39°35′51″N 108°48′11″W | Colorado State Highway 139 |
| Duchesnay Pass | British Columbia | 2667 m 8,750 ft | 51°22′31″N 116°25′54″W | Foot trail in Yoho National Park |
| Dunckley Pass | Colorado | 2976 m 9,763 ft | 40°12′06″N 107°09′31″W | Gravel road |
| Dunraven Pass | Wyoming | 2695 m 8,842 ft | 44°47′08″N 110°27′15″W | Grand Loop Road in Yellowstone National Park |
| Eagles Nest Pass | Alberta | 1860 m 6,102 ft | 53°28′41″N 118°34′12″W | Foot trail |
| Eccles Pass | Colorado | 3625 m 11,893 ft | 39°36′27″N 106°10′19″W | Foot trail in Arapaho National Forest |
| Edith Pass | Alberta | 1935 m 6,348 ft | 51°12′25″N 115°39′00″W | Foot trail in Banff National Park |
| Edith-Cory Pass | Alberta | 2362 m 7,749 ft | 51°12′15″N 115°40′40″W | Foot trail in Banff National Park |
| Elbow Pass | Alberta | 2088 m 6,850 ft | 50°38′00″N 115°00′40″W | Foot trail in Kananaskis Country |
| Electric Pass | Colorado | 4113 m 13,494 ft | 39°02′48″N 106°51′11″W | Foot trail in White River National Forest (Highest named pass in the Rocky Mountains |
| Elk Park Pass | Montana | 1936 m 6,352 ft | 46°02′11″N 112°27′33″W | (Great Northern Railway 1888-1972) |
| Elk Pass | Alberta; British Columbia | 1905 m 6,250 ft | 50°35′10″N 115°04′27″W | Foot trail in Peter Lougheed Provincial Park |
| Elkhead Pass | Colorado | 4037 m 13,245 ft | 38°57′06″N 106°22′02″W | Foot trail in San Isabel National Forest |
| Elysium Pass | Alberta | 2010 m 6,594 ft | 52°57′17″N 118°20′22″W | Foot trail in Jasper National Park |
| Emerald Pass | British Columbia | 2758 m 9,049 ft | 51°29′34″N 116°34′31″W | Foot trail in Yoho National Park |
| Engineer Pass | Colorado | 3900 m 12,795 ft | 37°58′32″N 107°35′04″W | Primitive road |
| Evan-Thomas Pass | Alberta | 2149 m 7,051 ft | 50°47′25″N 115°03′25″W | Foot trail in Kananaskis Country |
| Ewin Pass | British Columbia | 1996 m 6,549 ft | 50°00′36″N 114°44′00″W | Foot trail |
| Exshaw Pass | Alberta | 2210 m 7,251 ft | 51°09′40″N 115°13′00″W | Foot trail in Kananaskis Country |
| Fall Creek Pass | Colorado | 3916 m 12,848 ft | 39°26′32″N 106°28′38″W | Foot trail in White River National Forest |
| Fall River Pass | Colorado | 3585 m 11,762 ft | 40°26′29″N 105°45′11″W | Fall River Road in Rocky Mountain National Park |
| Fancy Pass | Colorado | 3779 m 12,398 ft | 39°24′38″N 106°30′23″W | Foot trail in White River National Forest |
| Fatigue Pass | Alberta; British Columbia | 2393 m 7,851 ft | 51°00′49″N 115°41′19″W | Foot trail in Banff National Park |
| Ferro Pass | British Columbia | 2271 m 7,451 ft | 50°56′00″N 115°43′00″W | Foot trail in Mount Assiniboine Provincial Park |
| Fetherstonhaugh Pass | Alberta; British Columbia | 1813 m 5,948 ft | 53°42′48″N 119°51′08″W | Foot trail |
| Fiddle Pass | Alberta | 2118 m 6,949 ft | 53°01′45″N 117°30′22″W | Foot trail in Jasper National Park |
| Firebrand Pass | Montana | 2119 m 6,952 ft | 48°23′28″N 113°20′20″W | Foot trail |
| Flathead Pass | British Columbia | 1753 m 5,751 ft | 49°27′00″N 114°40′00″W | Foot trail |
| Flesher Pass | Montana | 1871 m 6,138 ft | 46°58′31″N 112°21′30″W | Montana Secondary Highway 279 |
| Floyd Hill | Colorado | 2384 m 7,820 ft | 39°43′22″N 105°24′49″W | Interstate Highway Route 70 |
| Fording River Pass | British Columbia | 2362 m 7,749 ft | 50°19′00″N 114°47′00″W | Foot trail in Kananaskis Country |
| Forgetmenot Pass | Alberta; British Columbia | 1783 m 5,850 ft | 53°45′08″N 119°53′33″W | Foot trail |
| Fortress Pass | Alberta; British Columbia | 1356 m 4,449 ft | 52°21′41″N 117°42′20″W | Foot trail between Banff National Park and Hamber Provincial Park |
| Forty Mile Summit | Alberta | 2149 m 7,051 ft | 51°20′33″N 115°43′58″W | Foot trail in Banff National Park |
| Fourth of July Summit | Idaho | 939 m 3,081 ft | 47°37′16″N 116°31′24″W | in Coeur d'Alene National Forest |
| Fraser Pass | British Columbia | 2015 m 6,611 ft | 52°31′00″N 118°16′00″W | Trace |
| Fremont Pass | Colorado | 3450 m 11,318 ft | 39°21′59″N 106°11′12″W | in San Isabel National Forest to Arapaho National Forest (Denver, South Park and Pacific Railroad 1888) |
| Fremont Pass | Utah | 2295 m 7,529 ft | 38°05′00″N 112°27′27″W | Gravel road |
| French Pass | Colorado | 3673 m 12,050 ft | 39°26′22″N 105°57′05″W | Foot trail between Arapaho National Forest and Pike National Forest |
| Frigid Air Pass | Colorado | 3782 m 12,408 ft | 39°03′13″N 107°01′13″W | Foot trail in White River National Forest |
| Galena Summit | Idaho | 2652 m 8,701 ft | 43°52′14″N 114°42′48″W | in Sawtooth National Recreation Area |
| Galton Pass | British Columbia | 1905 m 6,250 ft | 49°01′00″N 114°55′00″W | Foot trail |
| Georgetown Summit | Idaho | 2040 m 6,693 ft | 42°31′30″N 111°24′55″W | U.S. Route 30 |
| Georgia Pass | Colorado | 3535 m 11,598 ft | 39°27′30″N 105°55′00″W | Gravel road between Arapaho National Forest and Pike National Forest |
| Gibbon Pass | Alberta | 2301 m 7,549 ft | 51°11′07″N 115°57′44″W | Foot trail in Banff National Park |
| Gibbons Pass | Montana | 2117 m 6,945 ft | 45°44′49″N 113°54′51″W | Beaverhead National Forest Road 106 (William Clark 1806) |
| Glacier Pass | Alberta | 2100 m 6,890 ft | 53°26′00″N 118°46′30″W | Foot trail in Jasper National Park |
| Glorieta Pass | New Mexico | 2304 m 7,559 ft | 35°35′29″N 105°46′40″W | in Santa Fe National Forest (Santa Fe Trail 1821, Battle of Glorieta Pass 1862, Atchison, Topeka and Santa Fe Railway 1879) |
| Golden Gate Pass | Colorado | 2363 m 7,754 ft | 39°48′57″N 105°23′49″W | Colorado State Highway Route 46 Jefferson County Road 70 |
| Goodsir Pass | British Columbia | 2210 m 7,251 ft | 51°13′00″N 116°19′00″W | Foot trail in Kootenay National Park |
| Gore Pass | Colorado | 2907 m 9,537 ft | 40°04′33″N 106°33′39″W | in Routt National Forest |
| Granite Pass | Colorado | 3683 m 12,083 ft | 40°16′28″N 105°36′20″W | Foot trail in Rocky Mountain National Park |
| Granite Pass | Wyoming | 2754 m 9,035 ft | 44°38′24″N 107°30′12″W | in Bighorn National Forest |
| Grant Pass | Alberta; British Columbia | 1935 m 6,348 ft | 53°02′52″N 118°45′20″W | Foot trail between Jasper National Park and Mount Robson Provincial Park |
| Grass Pass | Alberta | 1850 m 6,070 ft | 50°24′50″N 114°35′15″W | Foot trail in Kananaskis Country |
| Gray Pass | British Columbia | 1387 m 4,551 ft | 54°08′00″N 120°29′00″W | Foot trail |
| Grizzly Pass | Alberta | 2606 m 8,550 ft | 50°34′55″N 115°00′40″W | Foot trail in Kananaskis Country |
| Guanella Pass | Colorado | 3554 m 11,660 ft | 39°35′42″N 105°42′40″W | Clear Creek County Road 381 in Arapaho National Forest to Park County Road 62 in Pike National Forest |
| Guardsman Pass | Utah | 2955 m 9,695 ft | 40°36′23″N 111°33′18″W | Gravel road |
| Guinns Pass | Alberta | 2423 m 7,949 ft | 50°52′30″N 115°15′10″W | Foot trail in Kananaskis Country |
| Gunnery Pass | Alberta | 1874 m 6,148 ft | 50°25′09″N 114°36′04″W | Foot trail in Kananaskis Country |
| Gunsight Pass | Colorado | 3719 m 12,201 ft | 37°15′43″N 106°41′11″W | Foot trail between Rio Grande National Forest and San Juan National Forest |
| Gunsight Pass | Colorado | 3714 m 12,185 ft | 38°41′00″N 106°35′59″W | Foot trail in Gunnison National Forest |
| Gunsight Pass | Colorado | 3675 m 12,057 ft | 38°53′05″N 107°03′31″W | Primitive road to trail in Gunnison National Forest |
| Gunsight Pass | Colorado | 2545 m 8,350 ft | 40°12′33″N 106°19′54″W | Gravel road |
| Gunsight Pass | Montana | 2118 m 6,949 ft | 48°36′34″N 113°44′18″W | Foot trail in Glacier National Park |
| Gunsight Pass | Alberta; British Columbia | 2393 m 7,851 ft | 50°19′30″N 114°49′00″W | Foot trail in Kananaskis Country |
| Gypsum Gap | Colorado | 1859 m 6,100 ft | 38°01′20″N 108°42′33″W | Colorado State Highway Route 141 |
| Hagerman Pass | Colorado | 3639 m 11,939 ft | 39°15′54″N 106°29′02″W | Primitive road between San Isabel National Forest and White River National Forest (Colorado Midland Railway 1887) |
| Halfmoon Pass | Colorado | 3817 m 12,523 ft | 37°54′03″N 106°47′03″W | Foot trail in Rio Grande National Forest |
| Halstead Pass | Alberta | 2820 m 9,252 ft | 51°28′08″N 115°52′56″W | Foot trail in Banff National Park |
| Hancock Pass | Colorado | 3721 m 12,208 ft | 38°37′15″N 106°22′27″W | Primitive road between Gunnison National Forest and San Isabel National Forest |
| Hanington Pass | British Columbia | 1661 m 5,449 ft | 54°08′00″N 120°06′00″W | Foot trail |
| Hardscrabble Pass | Colorado | 2765 m 9,072 ft | 38°09′32″N 105°17′58″W | Colorado State Highway 96 |
| Hartley Pass | British Columbia | 1539 m 5,049 ft | 49°37′00″N 115°03′00″W | Foot trail |
| Hayden Pass | Colorado | 3254 m 10,676 ft | 38°17′35″N 105°51′02″W | Primitive road |
| Healy Pass | Alberta | 2332 m 7,651 ft | 51°05′32″N 115°52′03″W | Foot trail in Banff National Park |
| Heckert Pass | Colorado | 3703 m 12,149 ft | 39°07′25″N 107°02′31″W | Foot trail in White River National Forest |
| Hector Pass | Alberta | 2514 m 8,248 ft | 51°36′05″N 116°15′55″W | Foot trail in Banff National Park |
| Hermit Pass | Colorado | 3967 m 13,015 ft | 38°05′41″N 105°39′17″W | Primitive road in San Isabel National Forest to trail in Rio Grande National Forest |
| Highwood Pass | Alberta | 2206 m 7,238 ft | 50°35′58″N 114°59′16″W | in Kananaskis Country (Highest paved road in Canada) |
| Homestake Pass | Montana | 1940 m 6,365 ft | 45°55′20″N 112°24′58″W | in Deerlodge National Forest (Northern Pacific Railroad 1888-1983) |
| Hoosier Pass | Colorado | 3515 m 11,532 ft | 39°21′42″N 106°03′45″W | between Arapaho National Forest and Pike National Forest (John C. Fremont 1844) |
| Hornaday Pass | British Columbia | 1692 m 5,551 ft | 49°54′00″N 115°05′00″W | Foot trail |
| Howse Pass | Alberta; British Columbia | 1539 m 5,049 ft | 51°48′00″N 116°45′20″W | Foot trail in Banff National Park |
| Hunchback Pass | Colorado | 3810 m 12,500 ft | 37°42′17″N 107°31′12″W | Foot trail between Rio Grande National Forest and San Juan National Forest |
| Hurd Pass | British Columbia | 2636 m 8,648 ft | 51°17′00″N 116°32′00″W | Foot trail in Yoho National Park |
| Hurricane Pass | Colorado | 3880 m 12,730 ft | 37°55′03″N 107°37′01″W | Primitive road |
| Iceberg Pass | Colorado | 3605 m 11,827 ft | 40°25′03″N 105°44′46″W | in Rocky Mountain National Park |
| Imogene Pass | Colorado | 3998 m 13,117 ft | 37°55′56″N 107°44′10″W | Primitive road in Uncompahgre National Forest |
| Independence Pass | Colorado | 3689 m 12,103 ft | 39°06′32″N 106°33′50″W | between San Isabel National Forest and White River National Forest |
| Indian Pass | Alberta | 2430 m 7,972 ft | 52°48′21″N 118°10′49″W | Foot trail in Jasper National Park |
| Jackpine Pass | Alberta; British Columbia | 2020 m 6,627 ft | 53°21′31″N 119°25′51″W | Foot trail |
| Jacques Pass | Alberta | 1783 m 5,850 ft | 53°00′33″N 117°56′40″W | Foot trail in Jasper National Park |
| Jarvis Pass | British Columbia | 1473 m 4,833 ft | 54°05′27″N 120°09′30″W | Foot trail in Kakwa Provincial Park |
| Jewell Pass | Alberta | 1631 m 5,351 ft | 51°02′35″N 115°05′35″W | Foot trail in Kananaskis Country |
| Job Pass | Alberta | 2420 m 7,940 ft | 52°21′05″N 116°45′28″W | Foot trail |
| Jonas Pass | Alberta | 2301 m 7,549 ft | 52°20′08″N 117°10′16″W | Foot trail in Jasper National Park |
| Jones Pass | Colorado | 3796 m 12,454 ft | 39°46′25″N 105°53′21″W | Clear Creek County Road 202 to trail in Arapaho National Forest |
| Jones Pass | Wyoming | 2943 m 9,655 ft | 44°32′07″N 110°10′10″W | |
| Jones Pass | Alberta | 2210 m 7,251 ft | 51°31′15″N 116°03′55″W | Foot trail in Banff National Park |
| Jones Pass | Alberta | 1874 m 6,148 ft | 53°31′52″N 119°48′16″W | Foot trail in Willmore Wilderness Park |
| Juniper Pass | Colorado | 3365 m 11,040 ft | 39°40′20″N 105°33′54″W | in Arapaho National Forest |
| Kakwa Pass | British Columbia | 1570 m 5,151 ft | 53°58′00″N 120°09′00″W | Foot trail in Kakwa Provincial Park |
| Kebler Pass | Colorado | 3049 m 10,003 ft | 38°50′51″N 107°05′54″W | Gunnison County Road 12 in Gunnison National Forest |
| Kenosha Pass | Colorado | 3047 m 9,997 ft | 39°24′46″N 105°45′27″W | in Pike National Forest (Denver, South Park and Pacific Railroad 1879) |
| Kicking Horse Pass | Alberta; British Columbia | 1627 m 5,338 ft | 51°27′12″N 116°17′08″W | between Banff National Park and Yoho National Park |
| Kimpton Pass | British Columbia | 2179 m 7,149 ft | 50°36′00″N 115°54′00″W | Foot trail |
| Kingman Pass | Wyoming | 2170 m 7,119 ft | 44°56′06″N 110°43′24″W | Grand Loop Road in Yellowstone National Park |
| Kings Hill Pass | Montana | 2251 m 7,385 ft | 46°50′28″N 110°41′43″W | in Lewis and Clark National Forest |
| Kisoo Pass | British Columbia | 1692 m 5,551 ft | 49°15′00″N 114°40′00″W | Foot trail |
| Kiwetinok Pass | British Columbia | 2454 m 8,051 ft | 51°31′00″N 116°36′00″W | Foot trail in Yoho National Park |
| Kokomo Pass | Colorado | 3666 m 12,027 ft | 39°25′43″N 106°13′38″W | Foot trail between Arapaho National Forest and White River National Forest |
| Kootenai Pass | Montana | 1744 m 5,722 ft | 48°50′44″N 113°53′39″W | Foot trail |
| La Manga Pass | Colorado | 3121 m 10,239 ft | 37°04′39″N 106°23′10″W | in Rio Grande National Forest |
| La Poudre Pass | Colorado | 3104 m 10,184 ft | 40°28′36″N 105°49′24″W | Foot trail between Rocky Mountain National Park and Roosevelt National Forest |
| La Veta Pass | Colorado | 2817 m 9,242 ft | 37°35′35″N 105°12′12″W | (Denver & Rio Grande Railroad 1877) |
| Lake Pass | Colorado | 3724 m 12,218 ft | 38°59′49″N 106°33′43″W | Foot trail between Gunnison National Forest and San Isabel National Forest |
| Lemhi Pass | Idaho; Montana | 2246 m 7,369 ft | 44°58′28″N 113°26′43″W | Gravel road between Beaverhead National Forest and Salmon National Forest (Lewis and Clark Expedition 1805) |
| Lewis and Clark Pass | Montana | 1958 m 6,424 ft | 47°08′34″N 112°25′44″W | Foot trail between Helena National Forest and Lewis and Clark National Forest (Meriwether Lewis 1806) |
| Little Highwood Pass | Alberta | 2545 m 8,350 ft | 50°35′52″N 115°01′19″W | Foot trail in Kananaskis Country |
| Lizard Head Pass | Colorado | 3123 m 10,246 ft | 37°48′40″N 107°54′22″W | between San Juan National Forest and Uncompahgre National Forest Rio Grande Southern Railroad ) |
| Logan Pass | Montana | 2028 m 6,653 ft | 48°41′48″N 113°43′06″W | Going-to-the-Sun Road in Glacier National Park |
| Lolo Pass | Idaho; Montana | 1592 m 5,223 ft | 46°38′07″N 114°34′47″W | between Clearwater National Forest and Lolo National Forest |
| Lookout Pass | Idaho; Montana | 1431 m 4,695 ft | 47°27′16″N 115°41′40″W | between Coeur d'Alene National Forest and Lolo National Forest |
| Loren Pass | Alberta; British Columbia | 1539 m 5,049 ft | 53°29′59″N 119°48′37″W | Foot trail |
| Los Pinos Pass | Colorado | 3203 m 10,509 ft | 38°06′14″N 106°58′20″W | Gravel road in Gunnison National Forest |
| Lost Trail Pass | Idaho; Montana | 2140 m 7,021 ft | 45°41′38″N 113°56′53″W | between Beaverhead National Forest and Salmon National Forest |
| Loveland Pass | Colorado | 3656 m 11,995 ft | 39°39′49″N 105°52′45″W | in Arapaho National Forest |
| Lusk Pass | Alberta | 1740 m 5,709 ft | 50°59′35″N 114°58′25″W | Foot trail in Kananaskis Country |
| Luxor Pass | British Columbia | 1905 m 6,250 ft | 50°50′00″N 116°06′00″W | Foot trail |
| Maccarib Pass | Alberta | 2210 m 7,251 ft | 52°43′12″N 118°11′29″W | Foot trail in Jasper National Park |
| MacDonald Pass | Montana | 1924 m 6,312 ft | 46°33′41″N 112°18′31″W | in Helena National Forest |
| Malad Pass | Idaho | 1643 m 5,390 ft | 42°06′08″N 112°25′28″W | Interstate 15 in Idaho |
| Maligne Pass | Alberta | 2270 m 7,448 ft | 52°29′53″N 117°27′11″W | Foot trail in Jasper National Park |
| Marias Pass | Montana | 1596 m 5,236 ft | 48°19′00″N 113°21′17″W | between Flathead National Forest and Lewis and Clark National Forest (Great Northern Railway 1891) |
| Marmot Pass | Alberta | 2270 m 7,448 ft | 52°47′01″N 118°08′22″W | Foot trail in Jasper National Park |
| Marshall Pass | Colorado | 3317 m 10,882 ft | 38°23′29″N 106°14′50″W | Saguache County Road 32 between Gunnison National Forest and San Isabel National Forest (Denver & Rio Grande Railroad 1881-1955) |
| Marvel Pass | Alberta; British Columbia | 2118 m 6,949 ft | 50°50′28″N 115°34′44″W | Foot trail in Banff National Park |
| McArthur Pass | British Columbia | 2210 m 7,251 ft | 51°21′00″N 116°21′00″W | Foot trail in Yoho National Park |
| McClure Pass | Colorado | 2680 m 8,793 ft | 39°07′44″N 107°17′02″W | between Gunnison National Forest and White River National Forest |
| McGregor Pass | British Columbia | 1539 m 5,049 ft | 53°58′00″N 120°13′00″W | Foot trail |
| McHenrys Notch | Colorado | 3882 m 12,736 ft | 40°15′50″N 105°39′42″W | Foot trail |
| Medano Pass | Colorado | 3037 m 9,964 ft | 37°51′22″N 105°25′58″W | San Isabel National Forest Road 559 to Medano Pass Primitive Road in Great Sand Dunes National Park and Preserve |
| Merlin Pass | Alberta | 2060 m 6,759 ft | 52°58′34″N 117°51′05″W | Foot trail in Jasper National Park |
| Middle Kootenay Pass | Alberta; British Columbia | 1935 m 6,348 ft | 49°15′37″N 114°24′30″W | Foot trail |
| Miette Pass | Alberta; British Columbia | 2004 m 6,575 ft | 53°01′00″N 118°40′00″W | Foot trail |
| Miller Pass | British Columbia | 1682 m 5,518 ft | 50°40′00″N 115°35′00″W | Foot trail |
| Milner Pass | Colorado | 3279 m 10,758 ft | 40°25′11″N 105°48′41″W | Trail Ridge Road in Rocky Mountain National Park |
| Misko Pass | British Columbia | 2454 m 8,051 ft | 51°17′00″N 116°17′00″W | Foot trail in Kootenay National Park |
| Molar Pass | Alberta | 2484 m 8,150 ft | 51°38′33″N 116°15′30″W | Foot trail in Banff National Park |
| Molas Pass | Colorado | 3326 m 10,912 ft | 37°44′16″N 107°41′53″W | in San Juan National Forest |
| Monarch Pass | Colorado | 3446 m 11,306 ft | 38°29′48″N 106°19′32″W | between Gunnison National Forest and San Isabel National Forest |
| Monida Pass | Idaho; Montana | 2079 m 6,821 ft | 44°33′30″N 112°18′20″W | (Utah and Northern Railway 1880) |
| Monkman Pass | British Columbia | 1061 m 3,481 ft | 54°33′N 120°15′W | Monkman Pass Historical Trail |
| Monument Hill | Colorado | 2238 m 7,343 ft | 39°07′26″N 104°51′51″W | Interstate 25 in Colorado |
| Moonias Pass | British Columbia | 1698 m 5,571 ft | 54°07′00″N 120°18′00″W | Foot trail |
| Moose Pass | Alberta; British Columbia | 2027 m 6,650 ft | 53°13′50″N 119°01′05″W | Foot trail between Jasper National Park and Mount Robson Provincial Park |
| Mores Creek Summit | Idaho | 1865 m 6,118 ft | 43°55′55″N 115°40′04″W | in Boise National Forest |
| Mosca Pass | Colorado | 2968 m 9,737 ft | 37°43′58″N 105°27′16″W | Herfano County Road 583 to trail in Great Sand Dunes National Park and Preserve |
| Mosquito Pass | Colorado | 4017 m 13,179 ft | 39°16′53″N 106°11′10″W | Primitive road |
| Muddy Pass | Colorado | 2627 m 8,619 ft | 40°22′45″N 106°34′44″W | between Arapahoe National Forest and Routt National Forest |
| Mullan Pass | Montana | 1808 m 5,932 ft | 46°38′40″N 112°18′53″W | and gravel road in Helena National Forest (Northern Pacific Railway 1883) |
| Muncho Pass | British Columbia | 1095 m 3,593 ft | 58°49′57″N 125°43′49″W | Alaska Highway in Muncho Lake Provincial Park |
| Napoleon Pass | Colorado | 3668 m 12,034 ft | 38°41′56″N 106°27′37″W | Foot trail in Gunnison National Forest |
| Nez Perce Pass | Idaho; Montana | 1998 m 6,555 ft | 45°43′00″N 114°30′07″W | Gravel road |
| Nigel Pass | Alberta | 2149 m 7,051 ft | 52°14′39″N 117°06′30″W | Foot trail between Banff National Park and Jasper National Park |
| North Fork Pass | Alberta | 2423 m 7,949 ft | 51°28′40″N 115°48′40″W | Foot trail in Banff National Park |
| North Fork Pass | Alberta; British Columbia | 1996 m 6,549 ft | 49°55′20″N 114°41′22″W | Foot trail in Kananaskis Country |
| North Kananaskis Pass | Alberta; British Columbia | 2362 m 7,749 ft | 50°41′25″N 115°17′53″W | Foot trail in Kananaskis Country |
| North Kootenay Pass | Alberta; British Columbia | 2057 m 6,749 ft | 49°24′00″N 114°34′00″W | Foot trail |
| North La Veta Pass | Colorado | 2873 m 9,426 ft | 37°36′48″N 105°11′27″W | U.S. Route 160 |
| North Miette Pass | Alberta; British Columbia | 2179 m 7,149 ft | 53°02′00″N 118°39′15″W | Foot trail between Jasper National Park and Mount Robson Provincial Park |
| North Molar Pass | Alberta | 2667 m 8,750 ft | 51°39′23″N 116°13′30″W | Foot trail in Banff National Park |
| North Pass | Colorado | 3051 m 10,010 ft | 38°12′51″N 106°34′21″W | Colorado State Highway 114 |
| Numa Pass | British Columbia | 2362 m 7,749 ft | 51°04′25″N 116°08′40″W | Foot trail in Kootenay National Park |
| Odaray Pass | British Columbia | 2514 m 8,248 ft | 51°21′00″N 116°24′00″W | Foot trail in Yoho National Park |
| Og Pass | Alberta; British Columbia | 2301 m 7,549 ft | 50°56′58″N 115°36′48″W | Foot trail between Banff National Park and Mount Assiniboine Provincial Park |
| Ohio Pass | Colorado | 3068 m 10,065 ft | 38°50′05″N 107°05′30″W | Gunnison County Road 703 |
| Old Monarch Pass | Colorado | 3467 m 11,375 ft | 38°29′48″N 106°20′17″W | Gravel road |
| Old Rabbit Ears Pass | Colorado | 2918 m 9,573 ft | 40°23′59″N 106°37′03″W | Grand County Road 199 |
| Opabin Pass | British Columbia | 2606 m 8,550 ft | 51°20′00″N 116°18′00″W | Foot trail between Kootenay National Park and Yoho National Park |
| Ophir Pass | Colorado | 3606 m 11,831 ft | 37°51′02″N 107°46′46″W | Primitive road between San Juan National Forest and Uncompahgre National Forest |
| Original Monarch Pass | Colorado | 3515 m 11,532 ft | 38°30′41″N 106°20′49″W | Foot trail in Gunnison National Forest |
| Ottertail Pass | British Columbia | 2012 m 6,601 ft | 51°13′00″N 116°16′00″W | Foot trail in Kootenay National Park |
| Otto Pass | British Columbia | 2106 m 6,909 ft | 51°31′00″N 116°45′00″W | Foot trail in Yoho National Park |
| Packer Pass | Alberta | 2484 m 8,150 ft | 51°29′35″N 116°04′20″W | Foot trail in Banff National Park |
| Palliser Pass | Alberta; British Columbia | 2088 m 6,850 ft | 50°42′29″N 115°23′15″W | Foot trail in Banff National Park |
| Palmer Saddle | Colorado | 2204 m 7,230 ft | 39°07′22″N 104°54′46″W | (Denver & Rio Grande Railroad 1871) |
| Palo Flechado Pass | New Mexico | 2777 m 9,111 ft | 36°24′52″N 105°20′11″W | U.S. Route 64 |
| Paradise Pass | Alberta | 2545 m 8,350 ft | 50°45′55″N 115°04′25″W | Foot trail in Kananaskis Country |
| Pass Creek Pass | Colorado | 2865 m 9,400 ft | 37°37′14″N 105°13′46″W | Gravel road |
| Pass in the Clouds | British Columbia | 2545 m 8,350 ft | 50°27′10″N 115°08′15″W | Foot trail |
| Pawnee Pass | Colorado | 3823 m 12,542 ft | 40°04′33″N 105°38′06″W | Foot trail between Arapaho National Forest and Roosevelt National Forest |
| Pearl Pass | Colorado | 3875 m 12,713 ft | 38°58′46″N 106°49′24″W | Primitive road between Gunnison National Forest and White River National Forest |
| Phillips Pass | Alberta; British Columbia | 1570 m 5,151 ft | 49°38′45″N 114°39′45″W | Foot trail |
| Pine Creek Pass | Idaho | 2066 m 6,778 ft | 43°34′18″N 111°12′55″W | Idaho State Highway 31 |
| Pine Pass | British Columbia | 875 m 2,871 ft | 55°24′00″N 122°38′00″W | British Columbia Highway 97 Canadian National Railway |
| Piper Pass | Alberta | 2575 m 8,448 ft | 50°41′45″N 115°01′50″W | Foot trail in Kananaskis Country |
| Pipestone Pass | Montana | 1974 m 6,476 ft | 45°51′24″N 112°26′22″W | in Deerlodge National Forest (Chicago, Milwaukee, St. Paul and Pacific Railroad 1909-1980) |
| Pipestone Pass | Alberta | 2420 m 7,940 ft | 51°41′41″N 116°15′49″W | Foot trail in Banff National Park |
| Poboktan Pass | Alberta | 2454 m 8,051 ft | 52°23′07″N 117°10′08″W | Foot trail in Jasper National Park |
| Poncha Pass | Colorado | 2746 m 9,009 ft | 38°25′20″N 106°05′13″W | U.S. Route 285 |
| Powder River Pass | Wyoming | 2945 m 9,662 ft | 44°08′59″N 107°04′46″W | in Bighorn National Forest |
| President Pass | British Columbia | 2972 m 9,751 ft | 51°30′00″N 116°33′00″W | Foot trail in Yoho National Park |
| Providence Pass | British Columbia | 1722 m 5,650 ft | 53°57′00″N 120°04′00″W | Foot trail |
| Ptarmigan Pass | Colorado | 3709 m 12,168 ft | 40°18′38″N 105°42′04″W | Foot trail in Rocky Mountain National Park |
| Ptarmigan Pass | Colorado | 3591 m 11,781 ft | 39°41′11″N 106°00′12″W | Foot trail in Arapaho National Forest |
| Ptarmigan Pass | Colorado | 3588 m 11,772 ft | 39°29′35″N 106°15′12″W | Primitive road between Arapahoe National Forest and White River National Forest |
| Ptolemy Pass | Alberta; British Columbia | 1722 m 5,650 ft | 49°33′19″N 114°41′15″W | Foot trail |
| Pulsatilla Pass | Alberta | 2362 m 7,749 ft | 51°24′48″N 115°57′39″W | Foot trail in Banff National Park |
| Rabbit Ears Pass | Colorado | 2874 m 9,429 ft | 40°23′05″N 106°36′42″W | U.S. Route 40 in Colorado |
| Racehorse Pass | Alberta; British Columbia | 2118 m 6,949 ft | 49°46′17″N 114°38′48″W | Foot trail |
| Raton Pass | New Mexico | 2377 m 7,798 ft | 36°59′26″N 104°28′54″W | (Santa Fe Trail 1821, Atchison, Topeka and Santa Fe Railway 1878) |
| Raynolds Pass | Idaho; Montana | 2082 m 6,831 ft | 44°42′40″N 111°28′11″W | Idaho State Highway 87 Montana State Highway 87 |
| Red Hill Pass | Colorado | 3045 m 9,990 ft | 39°16′03″N 105°57′40″W | U.S. Route 285 |
| Red Man Pass | Alberta; British Columbia | 2332 m 7,651 ft | 50°48′10″N 115°33′10″W | Foot trail in Banff National Park |
| Red Mountain Pass | Colorado | 3920 m 12,860 ft | 39°00′48″N 106°35′40″W | Foot trail in Collegiate Peaks Wilderness |
| Red Mountain Pass | Colorado | 3383 m 11,099 ft | 37°53′56″N 107°42′43″W | in Uncompahgre National Forest |
| Red Mountain Pass | Colorado | 2513 m 8,245 ft | 40°58′59″N 105°56′12″W | Primitive road |
| Red Pass | British Columbia | 2027 m 6,650 ft | 53°02′00″N 119°00′00″W | Foot trail in Mount Robson Provincial Park |
| Red River Pass | New Mexico | 3003 m 9,852 ft | 36°41′12″N 105°23′03″W | Gravel road in Carson National Forest |
| Red Rock Pass | Idaho | 1465 m 4,806 ft | 42°21′23″N 112°02′36″W | (Lake Bonneville Flood circa 12,500 BCE) |
| Redearth Pass | Alberta; British Columbia | 2088 m 6,850 ft | 51°05′10″N 115°52′57″W | Foot trail in Banff National Park |
| Richmond Pass | Colorado | 3861 m 12,667 ft | 37°56′50″N 107°42′09″W | Foot trail in Uncompahgre National Forest |
| Rickerts Pass | Alberta | 2332 m 7,651 ft | 50°35′30″N 114°52′50″W | Foot trail in Kananaskis Country |
| Ripple Creek Pass | Colorado | 3153 m 10,343 ft | 40°06′43″N 107°17′44″W | Gravel road |
| Robson Pass | Alberta; British Columbia | 1597 m 5,240 ft | 53°10′01″N 119°07′43″W | Foot trail between Jasper National Park and Mount Robson Provincial Park |
| Rockwall Pass | British Columbia | 2210 m 7,251 ft | 51°09′00″N 116°15′00″W | Foot trail in Kootenay National Park |
| Rogers Pass | Colorado | 3623 m 11,886 ft | 39°52′13″N 105°41′47″W | Foot trail |
| Rogers Pass | Montana | 1716 m 5,630 ft | 47°04′35″N 112°22′14″W | Montana State Highway 200 |
| Rollins Pass | Colorado | 3559 m 11,676 ft | 39°56′03″N 105°40′58″W | Primitive road in Arapahoe National Forest to trail in Roosevelt National Forest (Denver, Northwestern and Pacific Railway 1903) |
| Rummel Pass | Alberta | 2393 m 7,851 ft | 50°50′50″N 115°16′45″W | Foot trail in Kananaskis Country |
| Sage Pass | Alberta; British Columbia | 2149 m 7,051 ft | 49°08′19″N 114°09′39″W | Foot trail in Waterton Lakes National Park |
| Salter Pass | Alberta | 1935 m 6,348 ft | 50°15′55″N 114°30′01″W | Foot trail in Kananaskis Country |
| Sangre de Cristo Pass | Colorado | 2886 m 9,468 ft | 37°37′10″N 105°11′42″W | Primitive road |
| Schofield Pass | Colorado | 3268 m 10,722 ft | 39°00′54″N 107°02′48″W | Primitive road |
| Searle Pass | Colorado | 3668 m 12,034 ft | 39°27′31″N 106°13′40″W | Foot trail in Arapaho National Forest |
| Sentinel Pass | Alberta | 2606 m 8,550 ft | 51°20′23″N 116°13′16″W | Foot trail in Banff National Park |
| Sentinel Pass | Alberta | 2118 m 6,949 ft | 50°15′16″N 114°29′32″W | Foot trail in Kananaskis Country |
| Shale Pass | Alberta; British Columbia | 1905 m 6,250 ft | 53°36′22″N 119°43′37″W | Foot trail |
| Sheep Pass | British Columbia | 1631 m 5,351 ft | 53°49′00″N 120°02′00″W | Foot trail |
| Shovel Pass | Alberta | 2320 m 7,612 ft | 52°47′00″N 117°50′00″W | Foot trail in Jasper National Park |
| Shrine Pass | Colorado | 3379 m 11,086 ft | 39°32′46″N 106°14′27″W | Gravel road between Arapaho National Forest and White River National Forest |
| Sifton Pass | British Columbia | 1012 m 3,320 ft | 57°56′00″N 126°11′00″W | |
| Simpson Pass | Alberta; British Columbia | 2118 m 6,949 ft | 51°04′45″N 115°49′40″W | Foot trail between Banff National Park and Kootenay National Park |
| Sinclair Pass | British Columbia | 1486 m 4,875 ft | 50°40′00″N 115°56′00″W | in Kootenay National Park |
| Skogan Pass | Alberta | 2027 m 6,650 ft | 50°59′05″N 115°11′00″W | Foot trail in Kananaskis Country |
| Slumgullion Summit | Colorado | 3514 m 11,530 ft | 37°59′15″N 107°12′48″W | in Gunnison National Forest |
| Smuts Pass | Alberta | 2332 m 7,651 ft | 50°47′50″N 115°23′05″W | Foot trail between Banff National Park and Kananaskis Country |
| Snake Indian Pass | Alberta | 2020 m 6,627 ft | 53°19′00″N 118°58′00″W | Foot trail in Jasper National Park |
| Snowbird Pass | Alberta; British Columbia | 2423 m 7,949 ft | 53°08′44″N 119°02′58″W | Foot trail between Jasper National Park and Mount Robson Provincial Park |
| Snowy Range Pass | Wyoming | 3315 m 10,876 ft | 41°20′39″N 106°18′07″W | Wyoming Highway 130 |
| Soldier Summit | Utah | 2291 m 7,516 ft | 38°19′21″N 112°50′52″W | U.S. Route 6 in Utah |
| South Kananaskis Pass | Alberta; British Columbia | 2301 m 7,549 ft | 50°38′20″N 115°17′12″W | Foot trail in Kananaskis Country |
| South Kootenay Pass | Alberta; British Columbia | 2088 m 6,850 ft | 49°06′33″N 114°08′58″W | Foot trail in Waterton Lakes National Park |
| South Miette Pass | Alberta; British Columbia | 2119 m 6,952 ft | 52°59′10″N 118°39′45″W | Foot trail between Jasper National Park and Mount Robson Provincial Park |
| South Pass | Wyoming | 2304 m 7,559 ft | 42°22′12″N 108°54′48″W | (Oregon Trail 1812, Mormon Trail 1847, California Trail 1848, Pony Express 1860-1861) |
| South Pass | Alberta; British Columbia | 2141 m 7,024 ft | 52°59′11″N 118°39′39″W | Foot trail |
| Southesk Pass | Alberta | 2270 m 7,448 ft | 52°43′27″N 117°08′06″W | Foot trail in Jasper National Park |
| Spray Pass | Alberta; British Columbia | 1935 m 6,348 ft | 50°44′48″N 115°25′45″W | Foot trail in Banff National Park |
| Spring Creek Pass | Colorado | 3319 m 10,889 ft | 37°56′27″N 107°09′33″W | Colorado State Highway 149 |
| Spring Valley Summit | Idaho | 1294 m 4,247 ft | 43°50′14″N 116°14′41″W | Idaho State Highway 55 |
| Mestaa'ėhehe Pass | Colorado | 2990 m 9,810 ft | 39°40′45″N 105°28′25″W | in Arapaho National Forest |
| Straight Creek (Eisenhower Tunnel Approach) | Colorado | 3401 m 11,158 ft | 39°40′43″N 105°55′12″W | Highest point on the Interstate System |
| Stone Man Pass | Colorado | 3812 m 12,506 ft | 40°15′34″N 105°39′10″W | Foot trail in Rocky Mountain National Park |
| Stoney Pass | Alberta | 2332 m 7,651 ft | 51°25′40″N 115°30′35″W | Foot trail in Banff National Park |
| Stony Pass | Colorado | 3838 m 12,592 ft | 37°47′43″N 107°32′58″W | Primitive road between Rio Grande National Forest and San Juan National Forest |
| Storm Pass | Colorado | 3766 m 12,355 ft | 38°42′44″N 107°10′37″W | Foot trail in Gunnison National Forest |
| Summit Pass | British Columbia | 1267 m 4,157 ft | 58°39′00″N 124°41′00″W | Alaska Highway |
| Sundance Pass | Alberta | 1753 m 5,751 ft | 51°06′08″N 115°33′41″W | Foot trail in Banff National Park |
| Sunnyside Saddle | Colorado | 3864 m 12,677 ft | 37°54′26″N 107°37′08″W | Foot trail |
| Sunset Pass | Alberta | 2060 m 6,759 ft | 52°06′28″N 116°51′40″W | Foot trail in Banff National Park |
| Sunwapta Pass | Alberta | 2027 m 6,650 ft | 52°12′50″N 117°09′34″W | Icefields Parkway between Banff National Park and Jasper National Park |
| Surprise Pass | British Columbia | 2149 m 7,051 ft | 53°53′00″N 120°01′00″W | Foot trail |
| Swiftcurrent Pass | Montana | 2191 m 7,188 ft | 48°46′42″N 113°45′51″W | Foot trail in Glacier National Park |
| Sylvan Pass | Wyoming | 2598 m 8,524 ft | 44°27′56″N 110°07′49″W | in Yellowstone National Park |
| Sylvan Pass | British Columbia | 2332 m 7,651 ft | 50°31′00″N 115°13′00″W | Foot trail in Height of the Rockies Provincial Park |
| Targhee Pass | Idaho; Montana | 2158 m 7,080 ft | 44°40′29″N 111°16′33″W | U.S. Route 20 |
| Taylor Pass | Colorado | 3636 m 11,929 ft | 39°01′13″N 106°45′20″W | Primitive road between Gunnison National Forest and White River National Forest |
| Taylor Pass | Alberta | 2423 m 7,949 ft | 51°17′45″N 116°07′00″W | Foot trail in Banff National Park |
| Tennessee Pass | Colorado | 3131 m 10,272 ft | 39°21′44″N 106°18′38″W | Denver & Rio Grande Railroad 1881-1997 |
| Tent Mountain Pass | Alberta; British Columbia | 1478 m 4,849 ft | 49°34′22″N 114°43′18″W | Foot trail |
| Teton Pass | Wyoming | 2571 m 8,435 ft | 43°29′51″N 110°57′19″W | Wyoming Highway 22 |
| The Keyhole | Colorado | 4012 m 13,163 ft | 40°15′39″N 105°37′16″W | Foot trail in Rocky Mountain National Park |
| The Notch | Colorado | 3973 m 13,035 ft | 40°15′15″N 105°36′49″W | Foot trail in Rocky Mountain National Park |
| The Saddle | Colorado | 3775 m 12,385 ft | 40°28′45″N 105°39′25″W | Foot trail in Rocky Mountain National Park |
| The Saddleback | Alberta | 2330 m 7,644 ft | 51°23′35″N 116°12′45″W | Foot trail in Banff National Park |
| The Window | Colorado | 3925 m 12,877 ft | 37°40′08″N 107°23′34″W | Foot trail |
| Thompson Pass | Alberta; British Columbia | 1996 m 6,549 ft | 52°02′28″N 117°15′29″W | Foot trail in Banff National Park |
| Three Sisters Pass | Alberta | 2271 m 7,451 ft | 51°01′15″N 115°21′55″W | Foot trail in Kananaskis Country |
| Timberline Pass | Colorado | 3508 m 11,509 ft | 40°22′32″N 105°40′20″W | Foot trail in Rocky Mountain National Park |
| Tincup Pass | Colorado | 3643 m 11,952 ft | 38°42′33″N 106°26′03″W | Forest Road 267 (4WD needed) between Gunnison National Forest and San Isabel National Forest |
| Togwotee Pass | Wyoming | 2943 m 9,655 ft | 43°45′00″N 110°04′48″W | U.S. Route 26 U.S. Route 287 |
| Tomichi Pass | Colorado | 3646 m 11,962 ft | 38°36′13″N 106°23′00″W | Primitive road in Gunnison National Forest |
| Tonquin Pass | Alberta; British Columbia | 1935 m 6,348 ft | 52°43′42″N 118°20′22″W | Foot trail between Jasper National Park and Mount Robson Provincial Park |
| Tornado Pass | Alberta; British Columbia | 2149 m 7,051 ft | 49°58′03″N 114°40′23″W | Foot trail |
| Trail Rider Pass | Colorado | 2966 m 9,731 ft | 39°06′17″N 107°02′56″W | Foot trail between Gunnison National Forest and White River National Forest |
| Trail Ridge High Point | Colorado | 3713 m 12,183 ft | 40°25′42″N 105°45′32″W | in Rocky Mountain National Park |
| Triangle Pass | Colorado | 3934 m 12,907 ft | 38°59′40″N 106°54′28″W | Foot trail between Gunnison National Forest and White River National Forest |
| Trimble Pass | Colorado | 3924 m 12,874 ft | 37°34′47″N 107°35′51″W | Foot trail in San Juan National Forest |
| Trout Creek Pass | Colorado | 2895 m 9,498 ft | 38°54′36″N 105°58′30″W | Denver, South Park and Pacific Railroad 1880) |
| Tumbling Pass | British Columbia | 2179 m 7,149 ft | 51°07′30″N 116°13′50″W | Foot trail in Kootenay National Park |
| Two Ocean Pass | Wyoming | 2478 m 8,130 ft | 44°02′28″N 110°10′03″W | Foot trail |
| Unaweep Divide | Colorado | 2134 m 7,001 ft | 38°47′26″N 108°39′18″W | Colorado State Highway 141 |
| Uneva Pass | Colorado | 3634 m 11,922 ft | 39°32′46″N 106°11′00″W | Foot trail in Arapaho National Forest |
| Upright Pass | Alberta; British Columbia | 1996 m 6,549 ft | 53°08′05″N 118°46′50″W | Foot trail between Jasper National Park and Mount Robson Provincial Park |
| Ute Pass | Colorado | 2800 m 9,186 ft | 38°56′30″N 105°09′27″W | U.S. Route 24 in Colorado |
| Vail Pass | Colorado | 3236 m 10,617 ft | 39°31′50″N 106°13′02″W | Interstate 70 in Colorado |
| Vasquez Pass | Colorado | 3564 m 11,693 ft | 39°47′16″N 105°49′45″W | Foot trail in Arapaho National Forest |
| Venable Pass | Colorado | 3821 m 12,536 ft | 38°03′56″N 105°37′32″W | Foot trail between Rio Grande National Forest and San Isabel National Forest |
| Verdant Pass | Alberta | 2149 m 7,051 ft | 52°38′39″N 118°05′08″W | Foot trail in Jasper National Park |
| Vermilion Pass | Alberta; British Columbia | 1661 m 5,449 ft | 51°13′39″N 116°02′59″W | between Banff National Park and Kootenay National Park |
| Vista Pass | Alberta | 2088 m 6,850 ft | 52°45′17″N 118°19′55″W | Foot trail in Jasper National Park |
| Wapiti Pass | British Columbia | 1375 m 4,511 ft | 54°26′00″N 120°49′00″W | |
| Warner Pass | British Columbia | 1300 m 4,265 ft | 54°23′00″N 120°42′00″W | |
| Wastach Pass | Alberta | 2545 m 8,350 ft | 51°19′46″N 116°14′38″W | Foot trail in Banff National Park |
| Weary Creek Gap | Alberta; British Columbia | 2240 m 7,349 ft | 50°23′53″N 114°51′12″W | Foot trail in Kananaskis Country |
| Webster Pass (Colorado) | Colorado | 3689 m 12,103 ft | 39°31′52″N 105°49′58″W | Primitive road between Arapaho National Forest and Pike National Forest |
| Wenkchemna Pass | Alberta; British Columbia | 2606 m 8,550 ft | 51°19′01″N 116°16′17″W | Foot trail between Banff National Park and Yoho National Park |
| West Maroon Pass | Colorado | 3782 m 12,408 ft | 39°02′09″N 106°59′51″W | Foot trail in White River National Forest |
| West Wind Pass | Alberta | 2088 m 6,850 ft | 50°59′25″N 115°18′10″W | Foot trail in Kananaskis Country |
| Weston Pass | Colorado | 3821 m 12,536 ft | 39°07′53″N 106°10′56″W | Primitive road |
| Whirlpool Pass | Alberta; British Columbia | 1813 m 5,948 ft | 52°29′19″N 118°14′00″W | Foot trail in Jasper National Park |
| Whiskey Pass | Colorado | 3825 m 12,549 ft | 37°12′08″N 105°10′03″W | Gravel road on private property |
| Whistling Pass | Alberta | 2301 m 7,549 ft | 51°06′25″N 115°55′25″W | Foot trail in Banff National Park |
| White Bird Hill Summit | Idaho | 1294 m 4,245 ft | 45°50′43″N 116°14′15″W | U.S. Route 95 in Idaho |
| White Man Pass | Alberta; British Columbia | 2149 m 7,051 ft | 50°47′00″N 115°30′00″W | Foot trail in Banff National Park |
| Whiterabbit Pass | Alberta | 2301 m 7,549 ft | 51°54′30″N 116°05′55″W | Foot trail in Banff National Park |
| Wilcox Pass | Alberta | 2362 m 7,749 ft | 52°15′49″N 117°14′44″W | Foot trail in Banff National Park |
| Wilkerson Pass | Colorado | 2897 m 9,504 ft | 39°02′17″N 105°31′32″W | U.S. Route 24 in Colorado |
| Willow Creek Pass | Colorado | 2944 m 9,659 ft | 40°21′01″N 106°05′21″W | Colorado State Highway 125 Bikecentennial |
| Willow Creek Pass | Montana | 1130 m 3,707 ft | 39°06′33″N 106°59′08″W | Kaniksu National Forest Road 154 |
| Willow Pass | Colorado | 3827 m 12,556 ft | 39°06′33″N 106°59′08″W | Foot trail in White River National Forest |
| Wind River Pass | Colorado | 2789 m 9,150 ft | 40°17′45″N 105°32′38″W | Colorado State Highway 7 |
| Windy Pass | Colorado | 3035 m 9,957 ft | 37°25′36″N 106°51′14″W | Foot trail |
| Windy Pass | Utah | 2717 m 8,914 ft | 40°17′01″N 111°30′39″W | Foot trail in Uinta National Forest |
| Windy Pass | Alberta; British Columbia | 2408 m 7,900 ft | 50°03′50″N 114°40′30″W | Foot trail |
| Wolf Creek Pass | Colorado | 3299 m 10,823 ft | 37°28′59″N 106°48′07″W | U.S. Route 160 |
| Wolverine Pass | British Columbia | 2210 m 7,251 ft | 51°09′00″N 116°16′00″W | Foot trail in Kootenay National Park |
| Wonder Pass | Alberta; British Columbia | 2393 m 7,851 ft | 50°53′32″N 115°35′40″W | Foot trail between Banff National Park and Mount Assiniboine Provincial Park |
| Yellow Jacket Pass | Colorado | 2262 m 7,420 ft | 40°18′11″N 106°52′13″W | Routt County Road 114 |
| Yellowhead Pass | Alberta; British Columbia | 1131 m 3,711 ft | 52°53′29″N 118°27′52″W | between Jasper National Park and Mount Robson Provincial Park |
| Yellowjacket Pass | Colorado | 2372 m 7,783 ft | 37°15′45″N 107°26′55″W | U.S. Route 160 |
| Yoho Pass | British Columbia | 1844 m 6,050 ft | 51°28′00″N 116°29′00″W | Foot trail in Yoho National Park |

== See also ==
- List of mountain passes
- Rocky Mountains
  - Canadian Rockies
  - Central Rocky Mountains
  - Western Rocky Mountains
  - Southern Rocky Mountains
- Mountain pass
  - List of mountain passes in Colorado
  - List of mountain passes in Montana
  - List of mountain passes in Wyoming
  - List of railroad crossings of the Continental Divide of North America
  - List of Rocky Mountain passes on the Continental Divide of the Americas
