= List of mountain passes in Colorado =

Relief map of the U.S. State of Colorado.

This is a list of some important mountain passes in the Rocky Mountains of the U.S. State of Colorado.

== Mountain passes and highway summits traversed by improved roads ==
Pass (Note: Pass name from the United States Geographic Names Information System except as noted.)	Maximum elevation (Note: Maximum topographic elevation data from the Colorado Department of Transportation except as noted.)	Maximum grade (Note: Maximum grade data from the Colorado Department of Transportation except as noted.)	Road surface (Note: Road surface material information from the Colorado Department of Transportation except as noted.)	Route (Note: Route information from the Colorado Department of Transportation except as noted.)	Coordinates (Note: World Geodetic System 1984 location coordinates from the United States Geographic Names Information System except as noted.)
Trail Ridge High Point (Note: Trail Ridge Road (U.S. Highway Route 34) crosses the Continental Divide at Milner Pass but reaches its highest point several miles northeast of the pass. Trail Ridge Road is the highest paved through highway in North America. Trail Ridge Road is normally closed from about October 15 through about May 25.)	12,183 feet 3,713 m	5.4% WB	Asphalt	US Highway Route 34	40.42839°N 105.75898°W
Cottonwood Pass (Note: This pass crosses the Continental Divide of the Americas.)	12,126 feet 3,696 m (Note: Cottonwood Pass is normally closed from about November 7 through about May 25.)		Asphalt	Chaffee CR 306; Gunnison CR 209	38.8277726°N 106.4091921°W
Independence Pass (Note: Independence Pass is normally closed from about November 7 through about May 25.)	12,095 feet 3,687 m	6.0%	Asphalt	Colorado State Highway Route 82	39.1088793°N 106.5639194°W
Cumberland Pass	12,015 feet 3,662 m		Gravel	Forest Road 765	38.6891616°N 106.4841944°W
Loveland Pass	11,992 feet 3,655 m	6.0%	Asphalt	US Highway Route 6	39.6635979°N 105.8791783°W
Iceberg Pass	11,827 feet 3,605 m (Note: Topographic elevation data from United States Geological Survey 1:24000 topographic map.)		Asphalt	US Highway Route 34	40.4174840°N 105.7461187°W
Fall River Pass	11,796 feet 3,595 m		Asphalt west Gravel east	Fall River Road	40.44141°N 105.75309°W
Guanella Pass	11,669 feet 3,557 m		Asphalt	Guanella Pass Road	39.5949872°N 105.7111165°W
Hoosier Pass	11,541 feet 3,518 m	8.0% NB	Asphalt	Colorado State Highway Route 9	39.3616552°N 106.0625190°W
Slumgullion Summit	11,530 feet 3,514 m	9.4% NB; 7.9% SB	Asphalt	Colorado State Highway Route 149	37.98755°N 107.21342°W
Boreas Pass	11,481 feet 3,499 m		Gravel		39.4110990°N 105.9694607°W
Old Monarch Pass	11,375 feet 3,467 m		Gravel	former US 50	38.4966634°N 106.3380805°W
Fremont Pass	11,318 feet 3,450 m	5.7%	Asphalt	Colorado State Highway Route 91	39.3663772°N 106.1866890°W
Berthoud Pass	11,315 feet 3,449 m	6.1% NB; 6.0% SB	Asphalt	US Highway Route 40	39.7983203°N 105.7777849°W
Monarch Pass	11,312 feet 3,448 m	6.4%	Asphalt	US Highway Route 50	38.4966636°N 106.3255801°W
Cordova Pass	11,248 feet 3,428 m		Gravel		37.3483477°N 105.0247231°W
Eisenhower Tunnel (Note: The highest elevation in the Eisenhower Tunnel is a short distance inside the West Portal. The tunnel passes under the Continental Divide of the Americas a few miles west of Loveland Pass. The Eisenhower Tunnel is the highest elevation on the Interstate Highway System of the United States.)	11,158 feet 3,401 m	7.0% EB; 6.0% WB	Concrete	Interstate Highway Route 70	39.67897°N 105.92486°W
Shrine Pass	11,089 feet 3,380 m		Gravel	former SH 293	39.54614°N 106.24083°W
Juniper Pass	11,020 feet 3,359 m		Asphalt	Colorado State Highway Route 103	39.67196°N 105.56472°W
Red Mountain Pass	11,018 feet 3,358 m	7.2%	Asphalt	US Highway Route 550	37.8988840°N 107.7120057°W
Molas Pass	10,910 feet 3,325 m	7.0%	Asphalt	US Highway Route 550	37.7377751°N 107.6981179°W
Spring Creek Pass	10,901 feet 3,323 m	7.5%	Asphalt	Colorado State Highway Route 149	37.9408311°N 107.1592184°W
Wolf Creek Pass	10,857 feet 3,309 m	6.8%	Asphalt	US Highway Route 160	37.48318°N 106.80207°W
Marshall Pass	10,842 feet 3,305 m		Gravel	Forest Road 200; Forest Road 243	38.3913877°N 106.2472458°W
Grand Mesa Summit (Note: The Grand Mesa Summit is the highest point on State Highway 65, the Grand Mesa Scenic and Historic Byway. Conditions can be quite severe in winter, though the road generally remains open.)	10,839 feet 3,304 m	6.4% NB	Asphalt	Colorado State Highway Route 65	39.02744°N 108.03163°W
Milner Pass	10,759 feet 3,279 m	5.4% WB	Asphalt	US Highway Route 34	40.4197060°N 105.8113990°W
Vail Pass	10,666 feet 3,251 m	7.0%	Asphalt	Interstate Highway Route 70	39.5305420°N 106.2172469°W
Coal Bank Pass	10,640 feet 3,243 m	6.5% NB	Asphalt	US Highway Route 550	37.7005528°N 107.7770087°W
Los Pinos Pass	10,509 feet 3,203 m		Gravel	Forest Road 788	38.1038842°N 106.9722686°W
Tennessee Pass	10,424 feet 3,177 m	6.0%	Asphalt	US Highway Route 24	39.36210°N 106.31043°W
Ripple Creek Pass	10,343 feet 3,153 m		Gravel	former SH 132	40.1119248°N 107.2956115°W
Buffalo Pass	10,300 feet 3,139 m		Gravel		40.5435886°N 106.6850437°W
Cameron Pass	10,276 feet 3,132 m	3.8% EB; 3.1% WB	Asphalt	Colorado State Highway Route 14	40.5208158°N 105.8925128°W
La Manga Pass	10,230 feet 3,118 m	5.2%	Asphalt	Colorado State Highway Route 17	37.0775096°N 106.3861430°W
Lizard Head Pass	10,222 feet 3,116 m	4.1%	Asphalt	Colorado State Highway Route 145	37.8111060°N 107.9061783°W
Tenderfoot Pass	10,200 feet 3,109 m		Asphalt	Colorado State Highway Route 67	38.76284°N 105.156601°W
Carnero Pass	10,166 feet 3,099 m		Gravel	Saguache CR 41G	38.0044416°N 106.4305896°W
North Pass	10,149 feet 3,093 m	6.0%	Asphalt	Colorado State Highway Route 114	38.21425°N 106.57239°W
Ohio Pass	10,065 feet 3,068 m		Gravel	Gunnison CR 703	38.8347153°N 107.0917150°W
Red Hill Pass	10,051 feet 3,064 m	6.0%	Asphalt	US Highway Route 285	39.2674141°N 105.9612036°W
Cochetopa Pass	10,022 feet 3,055 m	6.0%	Gravel	former SH 114	38.1627°N 106.59996°W
Cumbres Pass	10,022 feet 3,055 m	6.3%	Asphalt	Colorado State Highway Route 17	37.0205662°N 106.4500328°W
Kebler Pass (Note: Kebler Pass is normally closed from about November 7 through about May 25.)	10,007 feet 3,050 m		Gravel except asphalt over pass	former SH 135	38.84759°N 107.09837°W
Kenosha Pass	10,001 feet 3,048 m	5.3% EB	Asphalt	US Highway Route 285	39.4127556°N 105.7574844°W
Cucharas Pass	9,941 feet 3,030 m	5.9% NB; 5.4% SB	Asphalt	Colorado State Highway Route 12	37.3202922°N 105.0736148°W
Dunckley Pass	9,763 feet 2,976 m		Gravel	former SH 132	40.2016473°N 107.1586644°W
Willow Creek Pass	9,621 feet 2,932 m	6.3%	Asphalt	Colorado State Highway Route 125	40.35021°N 106.08927°W
Old Rabbit Ears Pass	9,573 feet 2,918 m		Asphalt	former US 40	40.39971°N 106.61749°W
Gore Pass	9,527 feet 2,904 m	6.3%	Asphalt	Colorado State Highway Route 134	40.0758190°N 106.5608697°W
Wilkerson Pass	9,507 feet 2,898 m	5.8%	Asphalt	US Highway Route 24	39.0380473°N 105.5255561°W
Currant Creek Pass	9,482 feet 2,890 m		Asphalt	Colorado State Highway Route 9	38.8369378°N 105.6361114°W
Rabbit Ears Pass	9,426 feet 2,873 m	6.8%	Asphalt	US Highway Route 40	40.38470°N 106.61171°W
North La Veta Pass	9,413 feet 2,869 m	6.0%	Asphalt	US Highway Route 160	37.6133412°N 105.1908351°W
Bigelow Divide	9,403 feet 2,866 m		Asphalt	Colorado State Highway Route 96	38.0986154°N 105.1277701°W
Pass Creek Pass	9,400 feet 2,865 m		Gravel	former SH 305	37.6205628°N 105.2294475°W
La Veta Pass	9,380 feet 2,859 m		Gravel	former US 160	37.59306°N 105.20334°W
Trout Creek Pass	9,346 feet 2,849 m	5.2%	Asphalt	US Highway Route 24 US Highway Route 285	38.9099949°N 105.9750131°W
Battle Mountain Summit	9,267 feet 2,825 m		Asphalt	US Highway Route 24	39.52302°N 106.38966°W
Ute Pass	9,165 feet 2,793 m	5.6%	Asphalt	US Highway Route 24	38.9416578°N 105.1574868°W
Wind River Pass	9,130 feet 2,783 m		Asphalt	Colorado State Highway Route 7	40.2958176°N 105.5438888°W
Black Mesa Summit	9,121 feet 2,780 m		Asphalt	Colorado State Highway Route 92	38.47575°N 107.54780°W
Hardscrabble Pass	9,085 feet 2,769 m		Asphalt	Colorado State Highway Route 96	38.15897°N 105.29943°W
Poncha Pass	9,010 feet 2,746 m	2.9%	Asphalt	US Highway Route 285	38.4222204°N 106.0869615°W
Dallas Divide	8,970 feet 2,734 m	6.4% EB; 5.0% WB	Asphalt	Colorado State Highway Route 62	38.0944357°N 107.8883971°W
McClure Pass	8,755 feet 2,669 m	8.0%	Asphalt	Colorado State Highway Route 133	39.1288754°N 107.2839398°W
Muddy Pass	8,710 feet 2,655 m	5.6%	Asphalt	US Highway Route 40	40.37904°N 106.57901°W
Blue Mesa Summit	8,704 feet 2,653 m		Asphalt	US Highway Route 50	38.38604°N 107.43284°W
Wondervu Hill	8,660 feet 2,640 m		Asphalt	Colorado State Highway Route 72	39.92435°N 105.39677°W
Promontory Divide	8,579 feet 2,615 m		Asphalt	Colorado State Highway Route 69	37.93785°N 105.327015°W
Baxter Pass	8,400 feet 2,560 m		Gravel		39.5819192°N 108.9526058°W
Gunsight Pass	8,332 feet 2,540 m		Gravel	former SH 289	40.2091512°N 106.3316971°W
Douglas Pass	8,268 feet 2,520 m	7.0%	Asphalt	Colorado State Highway Route 139	39.5974761°N 108.8031572°W
Cerro Summit	7,958 feet 2,426 m		Asphalt	US Highway Route 50	38.44400°N 107.64144°W
Raton Pass (Note: Raton Pass is the highest point on Interstate Highway Route 25. The pass is located 1,132 feet (345 m) south of the Colorado state line in the New Mexico. I-25 has an elevation of approximately 7,820 feet (2,384 m) at the state line.)	7,834 feet 2,388 m		Asphalt	Interstate Highway Route 25	36.99064°N 104.48180°W
Floyd Hill	7,820 feet 2,384 m		Asphalt	Interstate Highway Route 70	39.72269°N 105.41372°W
Yellowjacket Pass	7,783 feet 2,372 m		Asphalt	US Highway Route 160	37.2625034°N 107.4486630°W
Golden Gate Pass	7,754 feet 2,363 m		Asphalt	Colorado State Highway Route 46 Jefferson County Road 70	39.81579°N 105.39697°W
Yellow Jacket Pass	7,420 feet 2,262 m		Asphalt	Routt CR 14	40.3030364°N 106.8703255°W
Monument Hill	7,352 feet 2,241 m		Asphalt	Interstate Highway Route 25	39.12398°N 104.86428°W
Palmer Saddle	7,230 feet 2,204 m		Asphalt	Colorado State Highway Route 105	39.12289°N 104.91290°W
Unaweep Divide	7,048 feet 2,148 m		Asphalt	Colorado State Highway Route 141	38.7905393°N 108.6550963°W
Gypsum Gap	6,100 feet 1,859 m		Asphalt	Colorado State Highway Route 141	38.0222144°N 108.7092640°W

== Mountain summit highways ==
Highway (Note: Highway name from the Colorado Department of Transportation.)	Maximum elevation	Maximum grade	Road surface	Route	Coordinates
Mount Blue Sky Scenic Byway (Note: The Mount Blue Sky Scenic Byway, Colorado State Highway 5, ends about one quarter mile (400 m) from the summit of Mount Blue Sky. The highway is the highest paved road in North America. The highway is normally closed from about September 10 through about May 25, although access to Summit Lake at 12,836 feet (3,912 m) normally remains open until about September 30.)	14,140 feet 4,310 m	15%	Asphalt	Colorado State Highway Route 5	39.58793°N 105.64245°W
Pikes Peak Highway (Note: The Pikes Peak Highway ends on the summit of Pikes Peak. Pikes Peak is the most visited mountain summit in North America. The highway remains open all year weather permitting.)	14,115 feet 4,302 m	8%	Asphalt	Pikes Peak Toll Road	38.84054°N 105.04442°W

== Mountain passes traversed by unimproved roads ==
Pass	Elevation (Note: Topographic elevation data from the United States Geographic Names Information System except as noted.)	Road	Coordinates
Argentine Pass (Note: Argentine Pass is the highest road over the Continental Divide in North America.)	13,207 feet 4,025 m		39.6252648°N 105.7825078°W
Mosquito Pass	13,186 feet 4,019 m	former SH 300	39.2813783°N 106.1861328°W
Imogene Pass	13,117 feet 3,998 m		37.9322167°N 107.7361723°W
California Pass	12,960 feet 3,950 m		37.91273°N 107.60884°W
Black Bear Pass	12,840 feet 3,914 m	FSR 648	37.89951°N 107.74233°W
Engineer Pass	12,800 feet 3,901 m		37.9755509°N 107.5845038°W
Hurricane Pass	12,730 feet 3,880 m		37.91754°N 107.61702°W
Pearl Pass	12,713 feet 3,875 m		38.9794358°N 106.8233723°W
Stony Pass	12,650 feet 3,856 m		37.7952754°N 107.5495039°W
Cinnamon Pass	12,640 feet 3,853 m		37.9338850°N 107.5378368°W
Jones Pass	12,454 feet 3,796 m		39.7735978°N 105.8891785°W
Hancock Pass	12,208 feet 3,721 m	Forest Trail 266 (west); Forest Trail 299 (east)	38.6208293°N 106.3741919°W
Tincup Pass	12,154 feet 3,705 m	Forest Trail 267	38.70922°N 106.43426°W
Webster Pass	12,140 feet 3,700 m		39.5310980°N 105.8327881°W
Gunsight Pass	12,057 feet 3,675 m		38.8847145°N 107.0586584°W
Napoleon Pass	12,034 feet 3,668 m	Forest Trail 540	38.6988840°N 106.4603048°W
Tomichi Pass	11,962 feet 3,646 m	Forest Trail 888	38.6036070°N 106.3833589°W
Hagerman Pass	11,925 feet 3,635 m	former SH 104 (Carlton Tunnel)	39.2649883°N 106.4839177°W
Weston Pass	11,921 feet 3,634 m		39.1313809°N 106.1822427°W
Ophir Pass	11,789 feet 3,593 m		37.8505508°N 107.7795075°W
Ptarmigan Pass	11,777 feet 3,590 m		39.4930421°N 106.2533590°W
Rollins Pass	11,676 feet 3,559 m	former SH 138	39.9341537°N 105.6827817°W
Georgia Pass	11,585 feet 3,531 m		39.4583206°N 105.9166807°W
Paradise Divide	11,288 feet	FS734 & Paradise Basin Rd Gunnison Nat Forrest	39.98830N 107.06522 W
Hayden Pass	10,712 feet 3,265 m		38.2930541°N 105.8505653°W
Schofield Pass	10,707 feet 3,263 m	former SH 327	39.0149903°N 107.0467130°W
Medano Pass	9,931 feet 3,027 m		37.8561128°N 105.4327844°W
Mestaa'ėhehe Pass	9,790 feet 2,984 m	immediately south of SH 103	39.6791550°N 105.4736076°W
Black Sage Pass	9,721 feet 2,963 m	Forest Road 887	38.4905509°N 106.4516948°W
Sangre de Cristo Pass	9,472 feet 2,887 m		37.6194521°N 105.1950018°W
Arapaho Pass	8,953 feet 2,729 m		40.3849824°N 106.4725345°W
Red Mountain Pass	8,245 feet 2,513 m		40.9830325°N 105.9366729°W

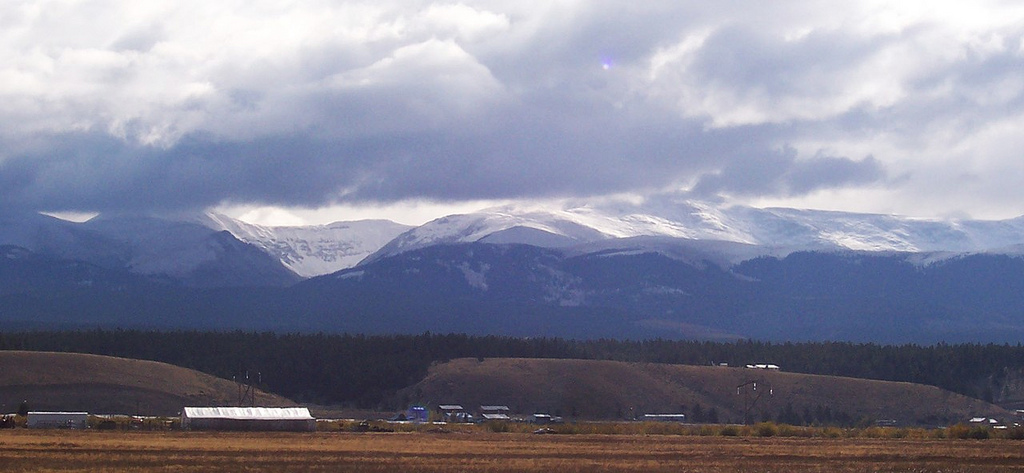
Weston Pass and the southern Mosquito Range.

== Mountain passes traversed by foot trails ==
Pass	Elevation	Trail	Coordinates
Electric Pass (Note: Electric Pass is the highest named pass in the Rocky Mountains of North America.)	13,494 feet 4,113 m		39.0466569°N 106.8530957°W
Elkhead Pass	13,245 feet 4,037 m		38.9516607°N 106.3672468°W
The Keyhole	13,163 feet 4,012 m		40.2608180°N 105.6211145°W
The Notch	13,035 feet 3,973 m		40.25415°N 105.61350°W
Hermit Pass	13,015 feet 3,967 m		38.09471°N 105.65477°W
Blue Lake Pass	12,969 feet 3,953 m		37.9977711°N 107.7953395°W
Denver Pass	12,907 feet 3,934 m		37.9547179°N 107.5620037°W
Triangle Pass	12,907 feet 3,934 m		38.9944355°N 106.9078200°W
The Window	12,877 feet 3,925 m		37.6688887°N 107.3928336°W
Trimble Pass	12,874 feet 3,924 m		37.5797220°N 107.5975598°W
Red Mountain Pass	12,860 feet 3,920 m		39.01331°N 106.59444°W
Fall Creek Pass	12,848 feet 3,916 m		39.44215°N 106.47719°W
Conundrum Pass	12,779 feet 3,895 m		39.0072131°N 106.9094867°W
McHenrys Notch	12,736 feet 3,882 m		40.2638737°N 105.6616716°W
Coffeepot Pass	12,726 feet 3,879 m		38.9922133°N 106.9030976°W
Sunnyside Saddle	12,677 feet 3,864 m		37.90720°N 107.61901°W
Columbine Pass	12,674 feet 3,863 m		37.5988885°N 107.6033934°W
Richmond Pass	12,667 feet 3,861 m		37.9472168°N 107.7025606°W
Willow Pass	12,556 feet 3,827 m		39.1091550°N 106.9856004°W
Whiskey Pass	12,549 feet 3,825 m	former SH 152	37.2022387°N 105.1675085°W
Heckert Pass	12,546 feet 3,824 m		39.12371°N 107.04183°W
Pawnee Pass	12,542 feet 3,823 m		40.0758195°N 105.6350029°W
Venable Pass	12,539 feet 3,822 m		38.0655549°N 105.6255632°W
Halfmoon Pass	12,523 feet 3,817 m		37.9008321°N 106.7842089°W
Copper Pass	12,510 feet 3,813 m		38.9994354°N 106.9153202°W
Stone Man Pass	12,506 feet 3,812 m		40.2594292°N 105.6527824°W
Hunchback Pass	12,500 feet 3,810 m	Continental Divide Trail	37.7047210°N 107.5200586°W
Buckskin Pass	12,462 feet 3,798 m		39.1019329°N 106.9919896°W
Trail Rider Pass	12,421 feet 3,786 m		39.1046886°N 107.0489359°W
Cony Pass	12,418 feet 3,785 m		40.1780410°N 105.6661159°W
Frigid Air Pass	12,408 feet 3,782 m		39.0536006°N 107.0203237°W
West Maroon Pass	12,408 feet 3,782 m		39.0358232°N 106.9975454°W
The Saddle	12,398 feet 3,779 m		40.4791501°N 105.6569479°W
Fancy Pass	12,398 feet 3,779 m		39.4105423°N 106.5064192°W
Storm Pass	12,355 feet 3,766 m		38.7122167°N 107.1769962°W
Lake Pass	12,218 feet 3,724 m		38.9969368°N 106.5619746°W
Gunsight Pass	12,201 feet 3,719 m		37.2619515°N 106.6864236°W
Gunsight Pass	12,185 feet 3,714 m	Forest Trail 428	38.6833273°N 106.5997532°W
Ptarmigan Pass	12,168 feet 3,709 m		40.3105402°N 105.7011174°W
Black Powder Pass	12,159 feet 3,706 m		39.4235988°N 105.9552934°W
Chalk Creek Pass	12,139 feet 3,700 m	Continental Divide Trail	38.6063852°N 106.3505802°W
Avalanche Pass	12,100 feet 3,688 m		39.1113766°N 107.1439370°W
Granite Pass	12,083 feet 3,683 m		40.2744290°N 105.6055582°W
Boulder-Grand Pass	12,077 feet 3,681 m		40.2244295°N 105.6691718°W
French Pass	12,046 feet 3,672 m		39.4394319°N 105.9514043°W
Searle Pass	12,034 feet 3,668 m	Continental Divide Trail; Colorado Trail	39.4585981°N 106.2278022°W
Kokomo Pass	12,027 feet 3,666 m	Continental Divide Trail; Colorado Trail	39.4285985°N 106.2272464°W
Browns Pass	11,998 feet 3,657 m		38.8538838°N 106.3594687°W
Taylor Pass	11,929 feet 3,636 m		39.0202688°N 106.7555921°W
Uneva Pass	11,922 feet 3,634 m		39.5460975°N 106.1833568°W
Arapaho Pass	11,905 feet 3,629 m		40.0144312°N 105.6780597°W
Eccles Pass	11,893 feet 3,625 m		39.6074862°N 106.1719677°W
Rogers Pass	11,886 feet 3,623 m		39.87021°N 105.69643°W
Buchanan Pass	11,837 feet 3,608 m		40.1310969°N 105.6302808°W
Caribou Pass	11,804 feet 3,598 m		40.0199868°N 105.6908380°W
Ptarmigan Pass	11,777 feet 3,590 m		39.68645°N 106.00321°W
Vasquez Pass	11,693 feet 3,564 m		39.7877647°N 105.8291760°W
Original Monarch Pass	11,532 feet 3,515 m	former Monarch Pass Toll Road	38.5113855°N 106.3469695°W
Timberline Pass	11,484 feet 3,500 m		40.3755397°N 105.6722269°W
Juniper Pass	11,040 feet 3,365 m	immediately south of SH 103	39.6722102°N 105.5649996°W
Weminuche Pass	10,567 feet 3,221 m		37.686346°N 107.323799°W
La Poudre Pass	10,175 feet 3,101 m		40.4766500°N 105.8233437°W
Windy Pass	9,957 feet 3,035 m		37.4266741°N 106.8539299°W
Mosca Pass	9,750 feet 2,972 m	former SH 150	37.7327799°N 105.4544542°W

== See also ==
- Bibliography of Colorado
- Geography of Colorado
- History of Colorado
- Index of Colorado-related articles
- List of Colorado-related lists
- Outline of Colorado
