= Jones Pass (disambiguation) =

Jones Pass is a pass between Clear Creek County and Grand County, Colorado, United States.

Jones Pass may also refer to:

- Jones Pass (Banff National Park), a pass in Banff National Park, Alberta, Canada
- Jones Pass (Willmore Wilderness Park), a pass in Willmore Wilderness Park, Alberta, Canada
- Jones Pass (Wyoming), a pass in Yellowstone National Park, Wyoming, United States

== See also ==
- Jones (disambiguation)
- List of mountain passes
