= Red Mountain Pass (disambiguation) =

Red Mountain Pass is a pass between Ouray County and San Juan County, Colorado, United States.

Red Mountain Pass may also refer to:

- Red Mountain Pass (Larimer County, Colorado), a pass in Larimer County, Colorado, United States
- Red Mountain Pass (Sawatch Range), a pass between Chaffee County and Gunnison County, Colorado, United States

== See also ==
- Red Mountain (disambiguation)
- List of mountain passes
