= Kokomo Pass =

Mountain pass in Colorado, USA

- Interactive map of Kokomo Pass
- Elevation: 12,027 ft (3,666 m)
- Traversed by: Colorado Trail

Third Approach
- Location: Eagle / Summit counties, Colorado, U.S.
- Range: Gore Range
- Coordinates: 39°25′43″N 106°13′38″W
- Topo map: USGS Copper Mountain

Kokomo Pass, elevation 12,027 ft (3,666 m), is a mountain pass in the Gore Range of the Rocky Mountains of Colorado in the United States.

== See also ==
- Southern Rocky Mountains
  - Gore Range
- Colorado mountain passes
