= Tenderfoot Pass =

Mountain pass in Colorado, USA

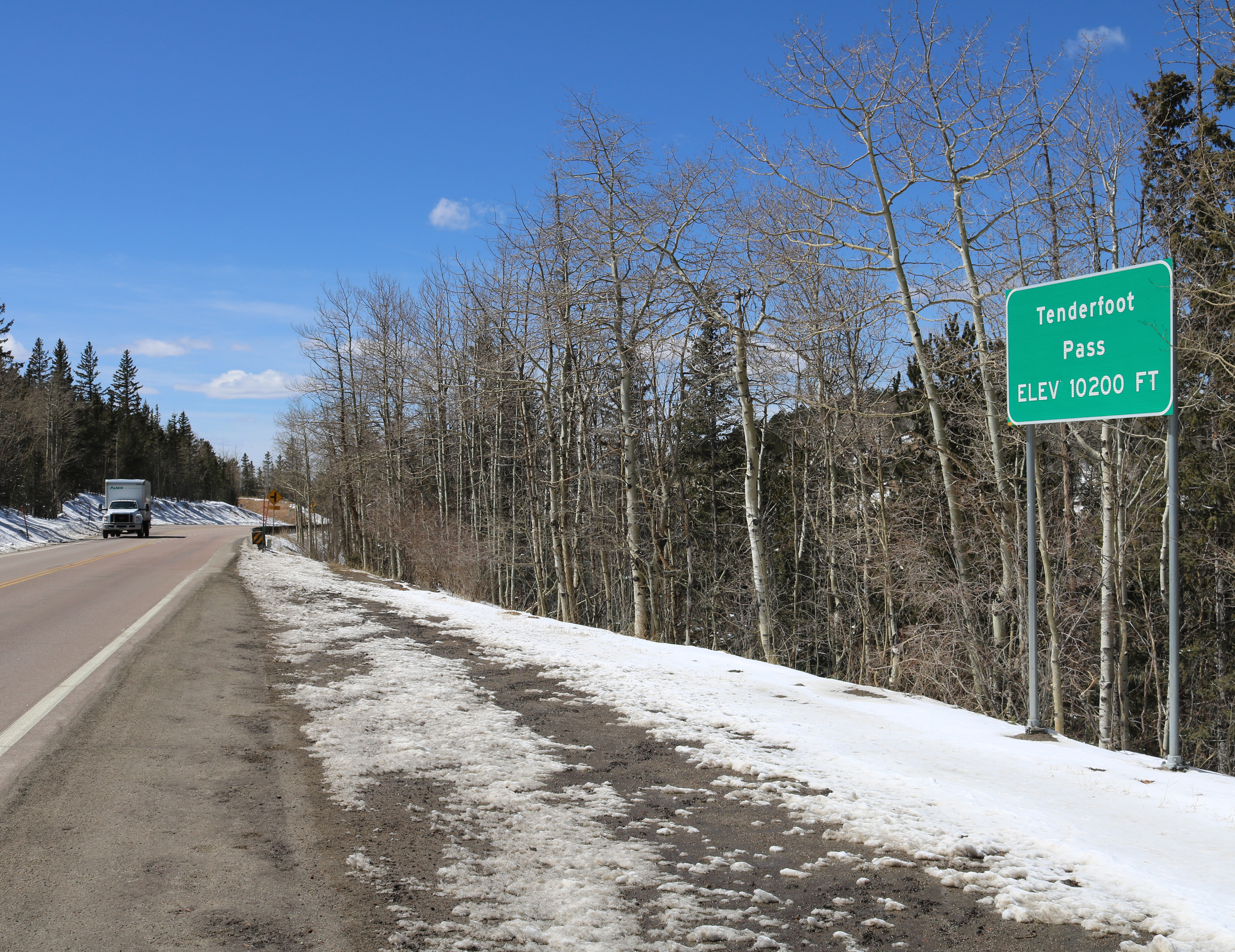
- The pass and Highway 67

- Location within Colorado
- Elevation: 10,200 ft (3,100 m)
- Traversed by: SH 67

Third Approach
- Location: Teller County, Colorado; United States
- Range: Front Range
- Coordinates: 38°45′46″N 105°09′23″W

Tenderfoot Pass is a mountain pass northeast of Cripple Creek that reaches a peak elevation of 10,200 feet (3,100 m).

== See also ==
- Colorado mountain passes
