= Georgia Pass =

Mountain pass in Colorado, USA

- Interactive map of Georgia Pass
- Elevation: 11,598 ft (3,535 m)
- Traversed by: Unimproved road, Colorado Trail

Third Approach
- Location: Park / Summit counties, Colorado, U.S.
- Range: Front Range
- Coordinates: 39°27′30″N 105°55′00″W
- Topo map: USGS Boreas Pass

Georgia Pass, elevation 11,598 ft (3,535 m), is a mountain pass that crosses the Continental Divide in the Front Range of the Rocky Mountains of Colorado in the United States.

== See also ==
- Southern Rocky Mountains
- Rocky Mountain Front
- Colorado mountain passes
