= Searle Pass =

Mountain pass in Colorado, USA

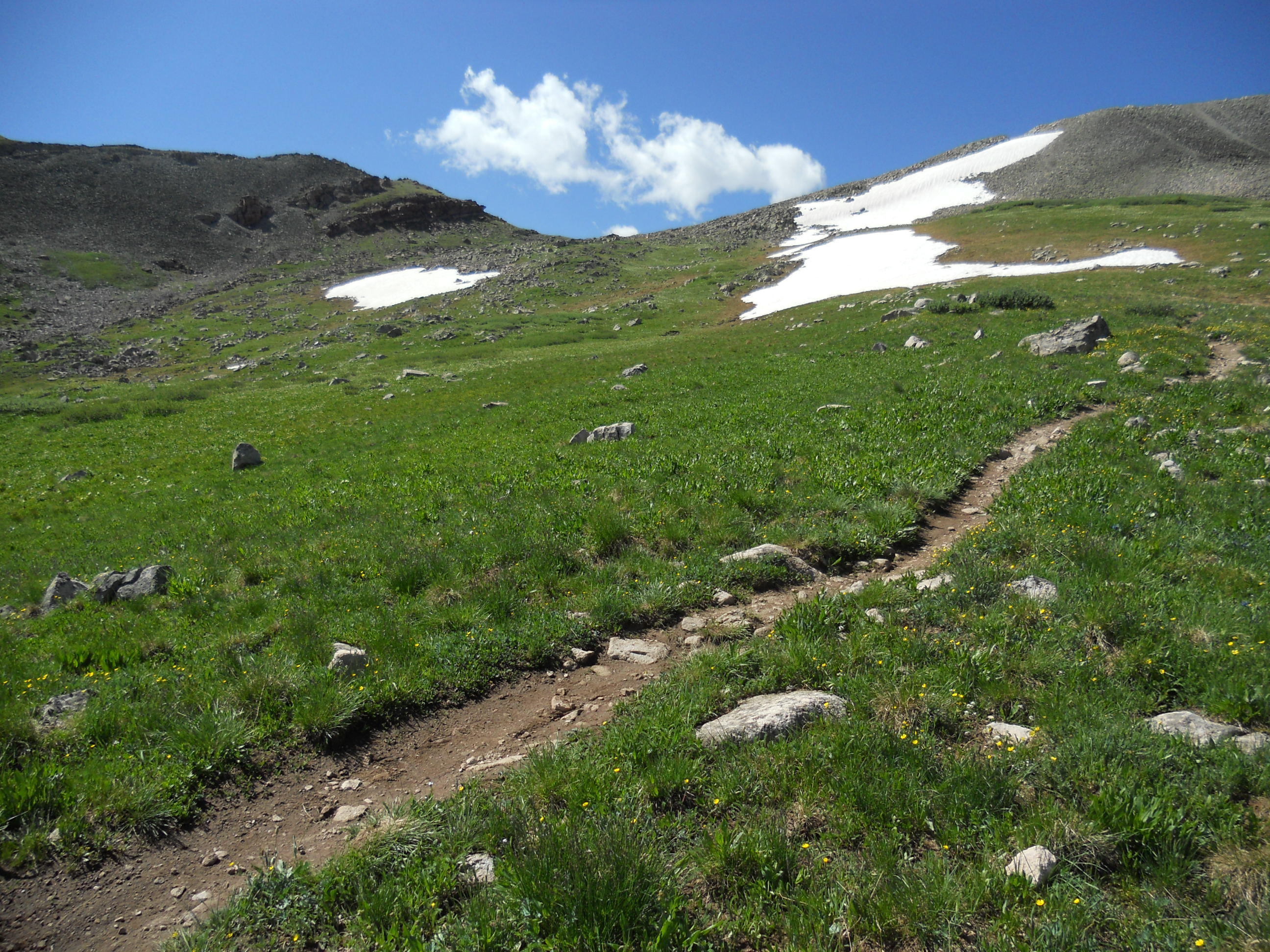
- Searle Pass viewed from the north.

- Location within Colorado
- Elevation: 12,034 feet (3,668 m)
- Traversed by: Continental Divide Trail and Colorado Trail

Third Approach
- Location: Summit County, Colorado, U.S.
- Range: Gore Range
- Coordinates: 39°27′31″N 106°13′40″W
- Topo map: USGS Copper Mountain

Searle Pass, elevation 12,034 ft (3,668 m), is a mountain pass in the Gore Range of the Rocky Mountains of Colorado. The pass is traversed by a path shared by the Continental Divide National Scenic Trail and the Colorado Trail.

== See also ==
- Colorado mountain passes
