= Whitepine, Colorado =

Ghost town in Gunnison County, Colorado, United States

Whitepine
- Ghost town
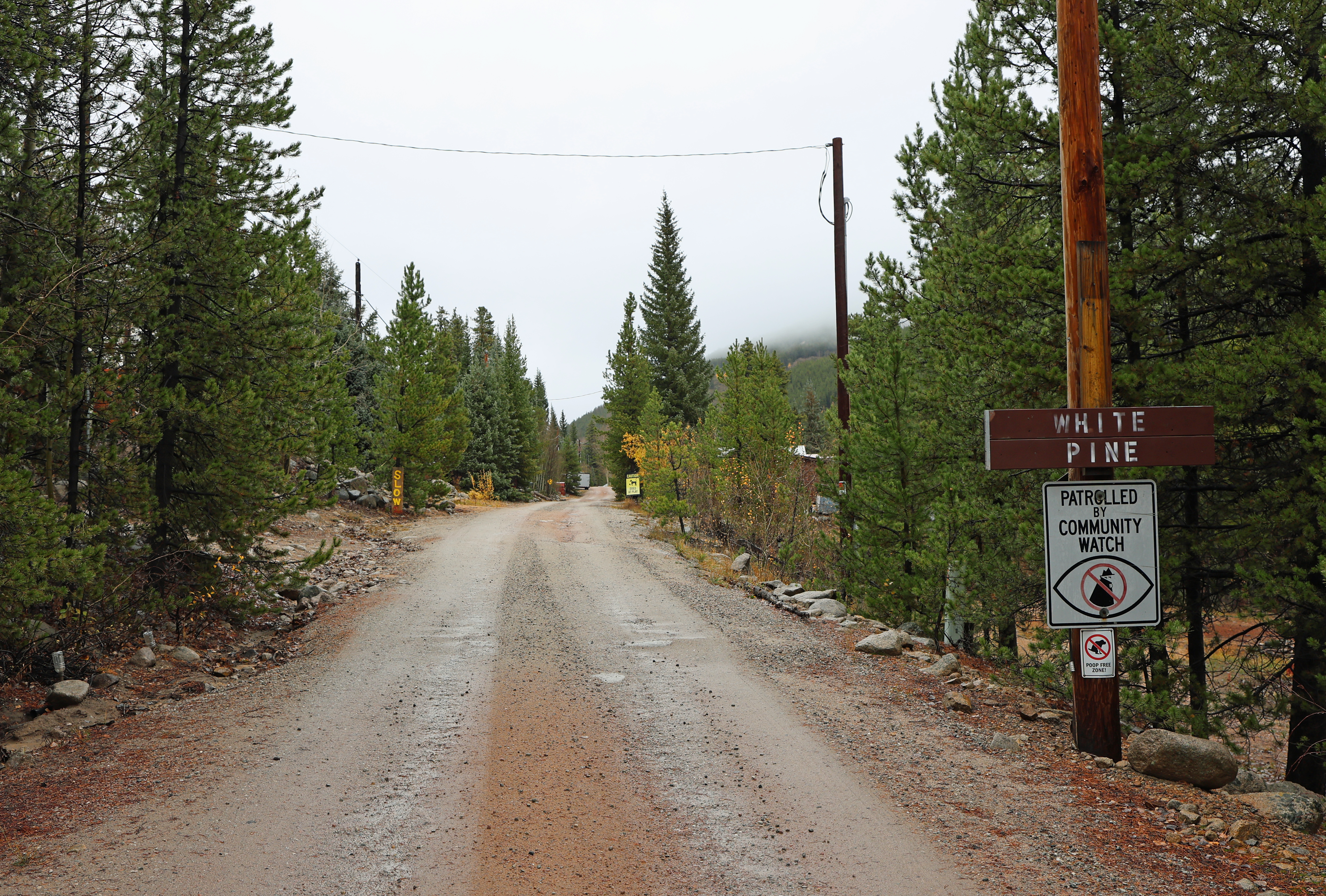
- Entering on Road 888

- Location within the state of Colorado Whitepine (the United States)
- Coordinates: 38°32′29.99″N 106°23′37.09″W
- Country: United States
- State: Colorado
- County: Gunnison
- Elevation: 9,712 ft (2,960 m)
- ZIP codes: 81248

Whitepine, also spelled White Pine, is a ghost town in Gunnison County, Colorado, United States. Whitepine was a mining camp established in 1880 along the headwaters of Tomichi Creek. The town lies south of Tomichi Pass along Gunnison County Road 888 about ten miles (16 kilometers) north of Sargents, Colorado.

== History ==
The town was first established as a mining camp in 1880. Within three years, the town had a newspaper, a post office, and regular stage service. Over 1,000 miners lived in the town and the surrounding area. A saloon was popular among the miners when they weren't working the mines. By 1885, the town began to decline, mostly because the mines were not very profitable. Then in 1893, the silver panic occurred, and the town was all but deserted.

In 1902, the Akron Mining Company purchased most of the mines and began extracting zinc and coal. The company prospered as World War I increased the demand for zinc. Later, in 1930, the Callahan Lead-Zinc Company bought the mine from Akron and began mining lead, zinc, and copper for the federal government. During World War II, the company re-built the town which again prospered. This boom, the final one, lasted until 1953.

== Whitepine today ==
As of 2025, the town has no year-round residents, but several families live there during the summer. Heavy snow on unplowed roads discourages winter occupancy.

== See also ==
- List of ghost towns in Colorado
