= Lake Pass =

Mountain pass in Colorado, USA

- Interactive map of Lake Pass
- Elevation: 12,218 ft (3,724 m)
- Traversed by: trail

Third Approach
- Location: Chaffee / Gunnison counties, Colorado, U.S.
- Range: Collegiate Peaks
- Coordinates: 38°59′49″N 106°33′43″W
- Topo map: USGS Pieplant

Lake Pass, elevation 12,218 ft (3,724 m), is a mountain pass that crosses the Continental Divide in the Collegiate Peaks of the Rocky Mountains of Colorado in the United States.

== See also ==
- Southern Rocky Mountains
  - Sawatch Range
    - Collegiate Peaks
- Colorado mountain passes
