= Boulder-Grand Pass =

Mountain pass in Colorado, USA

- Interactive map of Boulder-Grand Pass
- Elevation: 12,077 ft (3,681 m)
- Traversed by: trail

Third Approach
- Location: Boulder / Grand counties, Colorado, U.S.
- Range: Front Range
- Coordinates: 40°13′28″N 105°40′09″W
- Topo map: USGS Isolation Peak

Boulder-Grand Pass, elevation 12,077 ft (3,681 m), is a mountain pass that crosses the Continental Divide in Rocky Mountain National Park in Colorado in the United States.

== See also ==
- Southern Rocky Mountains
  - Front Range
- Colorado mountain passes
