= Stone Man Pass =

Mountain pass in Colorado, USA

- Location within Colorado
- Elevation: 12,506 ft (3,812 m)
- Traversed by: trail

Third Approach
- Location: Boulder / Grand counties, Colorado, U.S.
- Range: Front Range
- Coordinates: 40°15′34″N 105°39′10″W
- Topo map: USGS McHenrys Peak

Stone Man Pass, elevation 12,506 ft (3,812 m), is a mountain pass that crosses the Continental Divide in Rocky Mountain National Park in Colorado in the United States.

== See also ==
- Colorado mountain passes
