= Ptarmigan Pass (Front Range) =

Mountain pass in Colorado, USA

- Interactive map of Ptarmigan Pass
- Elevation: 12,168 ft (3,709 m)
- Traversed by: trail

Third Approach
- Location: Grand / Larimer counties, Colorado, U.S.
- Range: Front Range
- Coordinates: 40°18′38″N 105°42′04″W
- Topo map: USGS McHenrys Peak

Ptarmigan Pass, elevation 12,168 ft (3,709 m), is a mountain pass that crosses the Continental Divide in Rocky Mountain National Park in Colorado in the United States.

== See also ==
- Southern Rocky Mountains
- Southern Rocky Mountain Front
- Colorado mountain passes
