= Vasquez Pass =

Mountain pass in Colorado, USA

- Location within Colorado
- Elevation: 11,693 ft (3,564 m)
- Traversed by: trail

Third Approach
- Location: Clear Creek / Grand counties, Colorado, U.S.
- Range: Front Range
- Coordinates: 39°47′16″N 105°49′45″W
- Topo map: USGS Berthoud Pass

Vasquez Pass, elevation 11,693 ft (3,564 m), is a mountain pass that crosses the Continental Divide in the Front Range of the Rocky Mountains of Colorado in the United States.

== See also ==
- Southern Rocky Mountains
  - Front Range
- Colorado mountain passes
