= Wind River Pass =

- Location within Colorado
- Elevation: 9,150 feet (2,790 m)
- Traversed by: SH 7

Third Approach
- Location: Larimer County, Colorado, USA
- Range: Front Range
- Coordinates: 40°17′45″N 105°32′38″W
- Topo map: USGS Longs Peak

Wind River Pass elevation 9,150 ft (2,790 m) is a mountain pass in Larimer County, Colorado near the Twin Sisters Peaks.

== See also ==
- Colorado mountain passes
