= Windy Pass (Mineral County, Colorado) =

Mountain pass in Colorado, USA

- Location within Colorado
- Elevation: 9,957 feet (3,035 m)
- Traversed by: trail

Third Approach
- Location: Mineral County, Colorado, U.S.
- Range: San Juan Mountains
- Coordinates: 37°25′36″N 106°51′14″W
- Topo map: USGS Wolf Creek Pass

Windy Pass, elevation 9,957 ft (3,035 m), is a mountain pass in the San Juan Mountains of Colorado. The pass is in the San Juan National Forest southwest of Wolf Creek Pass.

== See also ==
- Colorado mountain passes
