= Yellowjacket Pass =

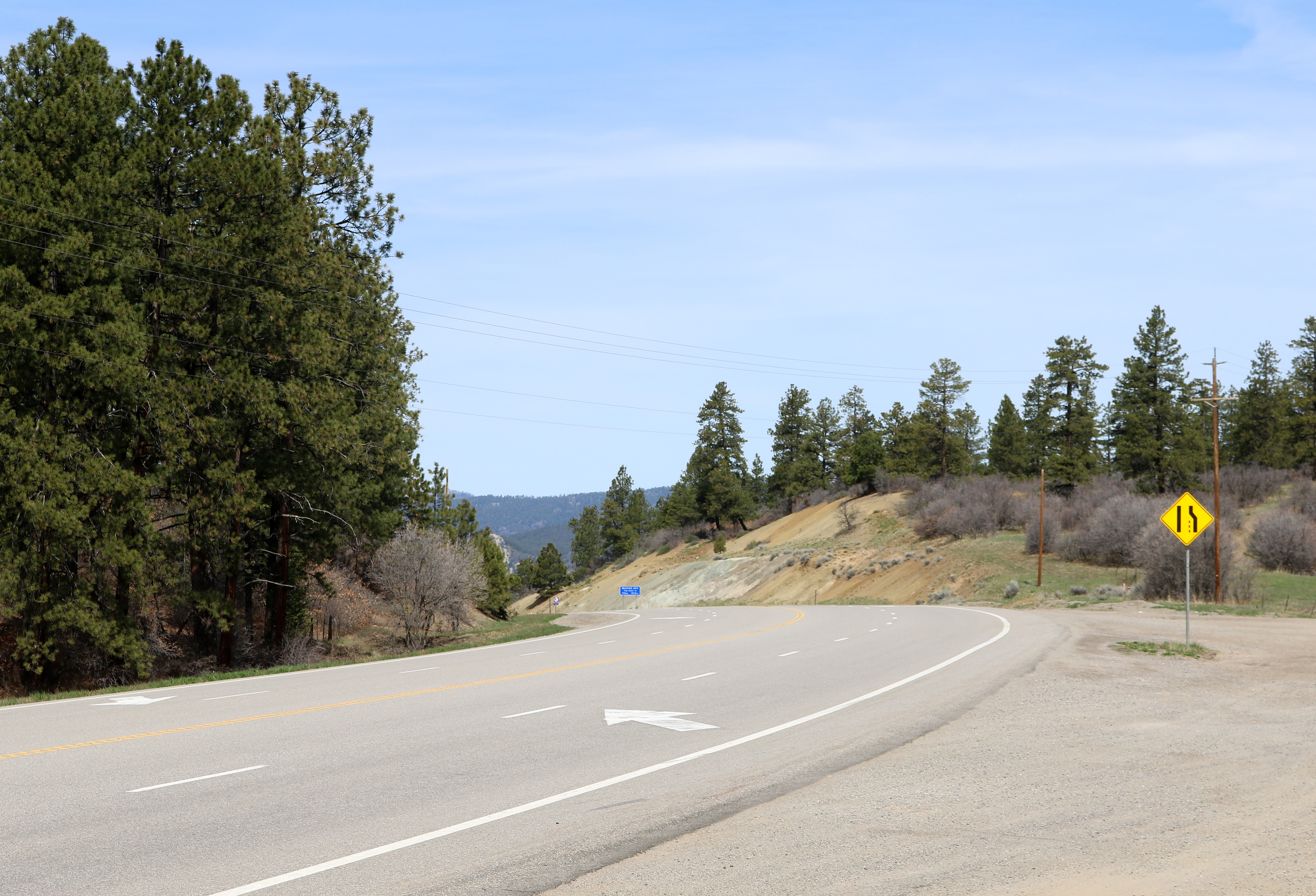
- Looking westbound from the summit

- Location within Colorado
- Elevation: 7,785 ft (2,373 m)
- Traversed by: US 160

Third Approach
- Location: Archuleta County, Colorado, USA
- Coordinates: 37°15′45″N 107°26′55″W
- Topo map: USGS Baldy Mountain

Yellowjacket Pass is a 7,785 ft (2,373 m) elevation mountain pass in Archuleta County, Colorado in the United States.

== See also ==
- Colorado mountain passes
