= Black Sage Pass =

Mountain pass in Colorado, USA

- Blacksage Pass
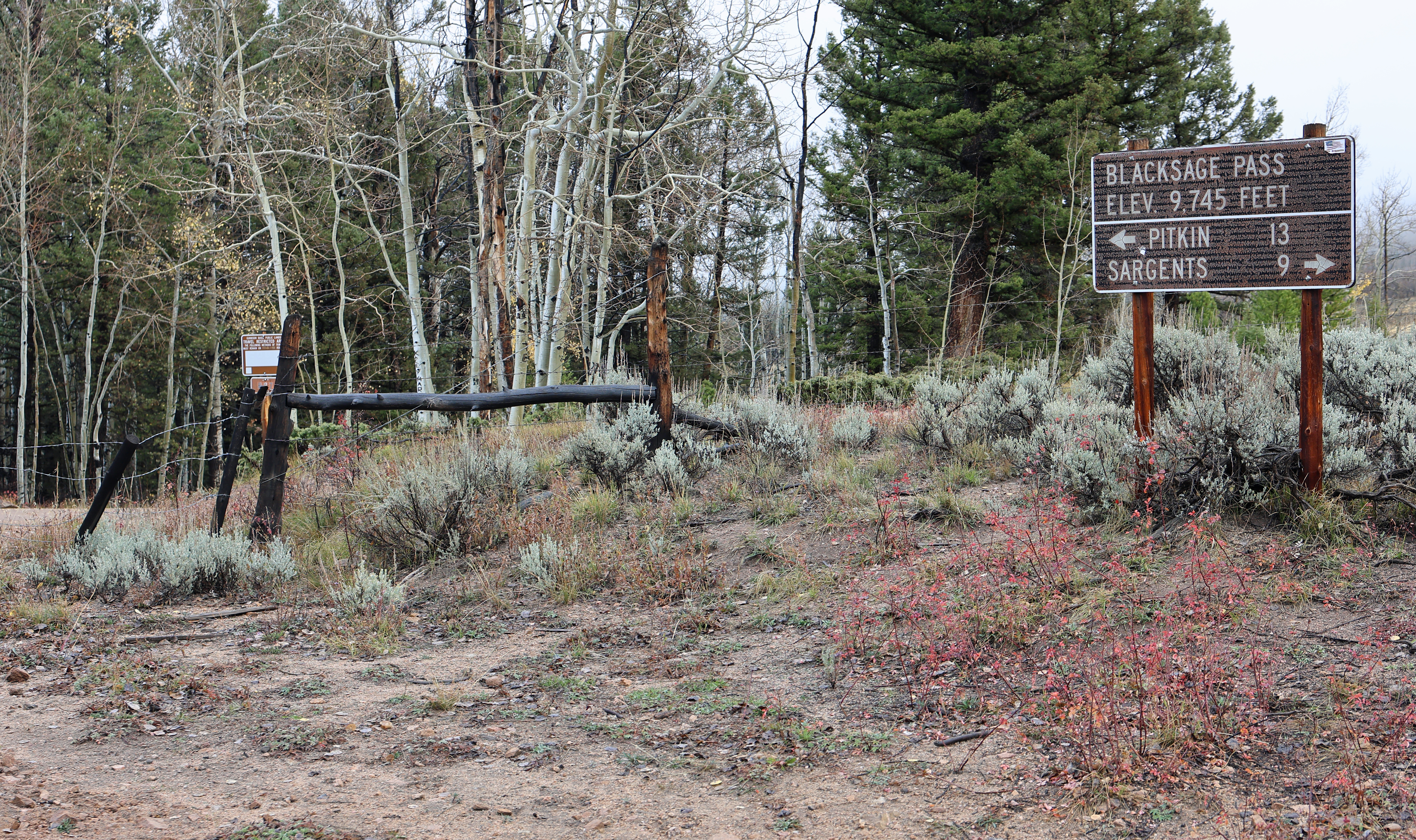

- Location within Colorado
- Interactive map of Black Sage Pass
- Elevation: 9,722 feet (2,963 m)
- Traversed by: Forest Road 887

Third Approach
- Location: Gunnison County, Colorado, U.S.
- Range: Sawatch Range
- Coordinates: 38°29′25.98″N 106°27′6.1″W
- Topo map: Sargents

Black Sage Pass (elevation 9,722 feet (2,963 meters)) is a high mountain pass in the Sawatch Range of the Southern Rocky Mountains of Colorado. It is in Gunnison County and in the Gunnison National Forest. The pass divides the watersheds of Spring Creek to the west and Mountain Spring Creek to the east.

== History ==
The Hayden geological survey used the pass to cross from Whitepine to Pitkin. The pass takes its name from Black Sage Peak, which is about one mile (1.6 kilometers) north of the pass. It was built around 1880, when miners needed a shorter path to the existing mines and mining camps.

Waunita Park, a broad treeless area with hot springs, lies to the west of the pass. Stagecoaches brought visitors and supplies to Waunita Hot Springs, a resort in Waunita Park, over the pass as late as the 1890s.
