= Coffeepot Pass =

Mountain pass and footpath in Colorado, USA

Coordinates: 38°59′32″N 106°54′11″W

Coffeepot Pass, elevation 12,726 ft (3,879 m), is a mountain gap and footpath located in the Maroon Bells–Snowmass Wilderness of Colorado. The pass offers a traverse over the Elk Mountains and connects the two counties of Gunnison and Pitkin.

The pass was named by expedition surveyors working under the supervision of topographer Ferdinand Vandeveer Hayden in the Elk Mountains in 1873. One explanation of the name is that a crew had moved on from a campsite on the pass only to find that they had lost a tin coffee pot. There is no record that the exploration relic has ever been found.
