= Halfmoon Pass =

Mountain pass in Colorado, USA

- Interactive map of Halfmoon Pass
- Elevation: 12,523 feet (3,817 m)
- Traversed by: trail

Third Approach
- Location: Saguache / Mineral counties, Colorado, U.S.
- Range: La Garita Mountains
- Coordinates: 37°54′03″N 106°47′03″W
- Topo map: USGS Halfmoon Pass

Halfmoon Pass, elevation 12,523 ft (3,817 m), is a mountain pass at the East end of the La Garita Mountain Range that forms the boundary between Mineral and Saguache counties. The pass separates the Saquache Creek and West Bellows Creek watersheds in the La Garita Mountains of Colorado. Both creeks are part of the Rio Grande watershed.
