= Currant Creek Pass =

Mountain pass in Colorado, USA

Current Creek Pass
- Location within Colorado
- Elevation: 9,485 ft (2,891 m)
- Traversed by: SH 9

Third Approach
- Location: Park County, Colorado, U.S.
- Range: Front Range
- Coordinates: 38°50′13″N 105°38′10″W
- Topo map: USGS Dicks Peak

Currant Creek Pass elevation 9,485 ft (2,891 m) is a mountain pass in the Front Range of central Colorado in the United States. The pass is a boundary between the Arkansas River basin and the Platte River basin.
