= Arapaho Pass (Rabbit Ears Range) =

Mountain pass in Colorado, USA

- Interactive map of Arapaho Pass
- Elevation: 8,953 ft (2,729 m)
- Traversed by: Unimproved road

Third Approach
- Location: Grand and Jackson counties, Colorado, United States
- Range: Rabbit Ears Range
- Coordinates: 40°23′06″N 106°28′21″W
- Topo map: USGS Spicer Peak

Arapaho Pass, elevation 8,953 feet (2,729 m), is a mountain pass that crosses the Continental Divide in the Rabbit Ears Range of the Rocky Mountains of northern Colorado in the United States.

== Climate ==
Climate data for Arapaho Ridge, Colorado, 2003–2020 normals: 10960ft (3341m)
Month	Jan	Feb	Mar	Apr	May	Jun	Jul	Aug	Sep	Oct	Nov	Dec	Year
Mean daily maximum °F (°C)	25.2 (−3.8)	25.5 (−3.6)	34.6 (1.4)	41.0 (5.0)	49.8 (9.9)	60.3 (15.7)	66.5 (19.2)	63.8 (17.7)	56.6 (13.7)	43.3 (6.3)	32.4 (0.2)	23.2 (−4.9)	43.5 (6.4)
Daily mean °F (°C)	17.3 (−8.2)	16.6 (−8.6)	24.5 (−4.2)	30.6 (−0.8)	39.3 (4.1)	49.2 (9.6)	55.5 (13.1)	53.3 (11.8)	46.6 (8.1)	34.4 (1.3)	24.2 (−4.3)	15.2 (−9.3)	33.9 (1.1)
Mean daily minimum °F (°C)	9.4 (−12.6)	7.8 (−13.4)	14.5 (−9.7)	20.1 (−6.6)	28.8 (−1.8)	38.1 (3.4)	44.6 (7.0)	42.8 (6.0)	36.6 (2.6)	25.6 (−3.6)	15.9 (−8.9)	7.3 (−13.7)	24.3 (−4.3)
Average precipitation inches (mm)	3.44 (87)	3.46 (88)	3.80 (97)	4.64 (118)	3.38 (86)	1.74 (44)	1.60 (41)	1.97 (50)	2.37 (60)	3.21 (82)	3.51 (89)	3.50 (89)	36.62 (931)
Source 1: XMACIS2
Source 2: NOAA (Precipitation)
