= Tomichi Pass =

Mountain pass in Colorado, USA

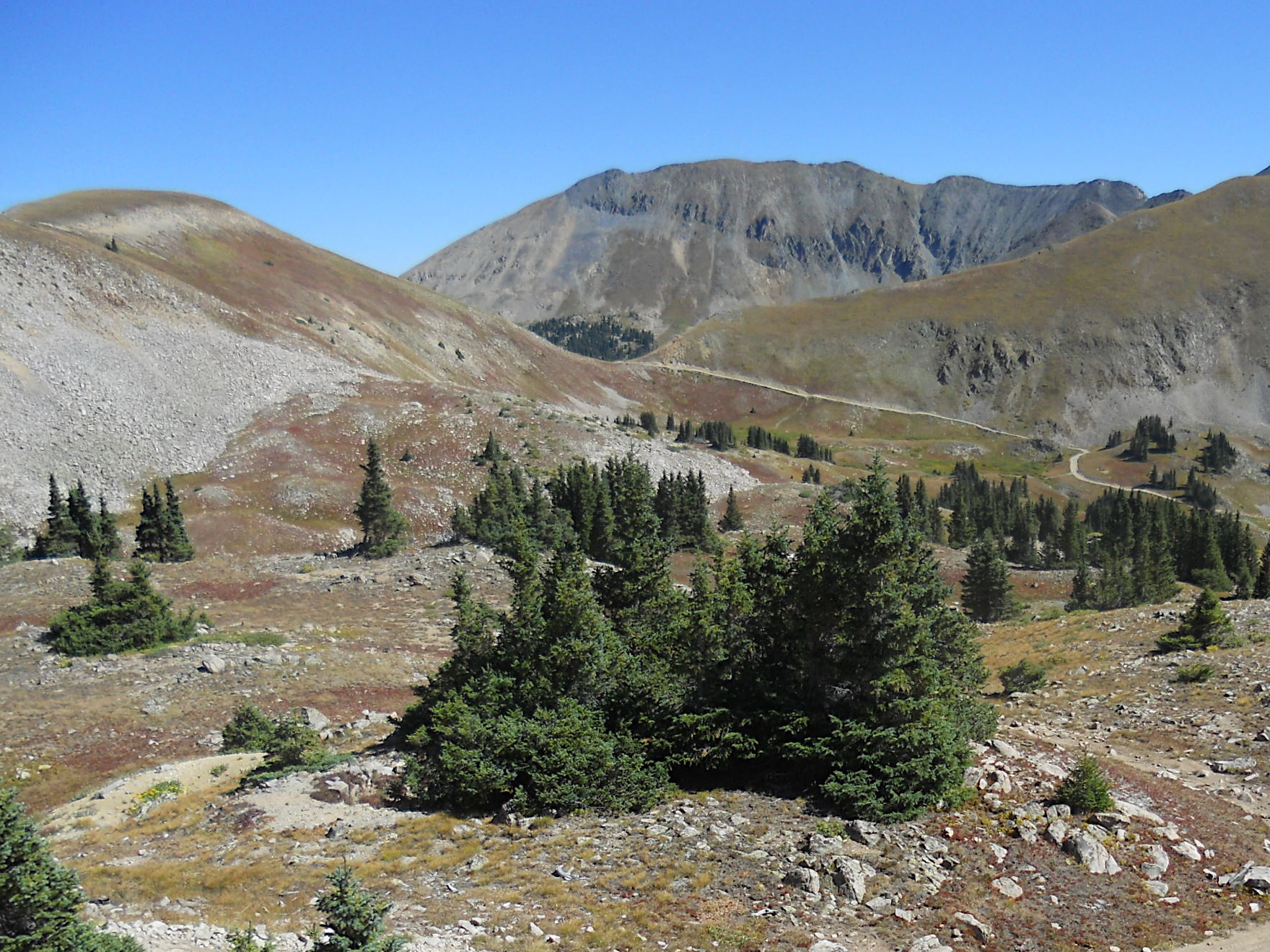
- Tomichi Pass
- Interactive map of Tomichi Pass
- Elevation: 11,962 feet (3,646 m)
- Traversed by: Forest Road 888

Third Approach
- Location: Gunnison County, Colorado, U.S.
- Range: Sawatch Range
- Coordinates: 38°36′13″N 106°23′00″W
- Topo map: Whitepine

Tomichi Pass (elevation 11,962 feet (3,646 m)) is a high mountain pass in the Sawatch Range of the Rocky Mountains of Colorado. It is located in Gunnison County and in the Gunnison National Forest. The pass divides the watersheds of Middle Quartz Creek to the north and Tomichi Creek to the south.

The pass is traversed by Forest Road 888, which is a four-wheel-drive path and is particularly narrow and exposed on the north side.

The pass was originally traversed by a pack trail connecting the mines and mining camps to the north with those to the south in the 1870s. Improvements eventually allowed the passage of wagons, but the road never saw significant traffic.

== Geology ==
Tomichi Pass lies on a ridge composed of Middle Tertiary intrusive rock. This stock of granitic rock was intruded into older Proterozoic granitic rock and Paleozoic sedimentary rock in the area. Also intruded were many igneous dikes and sills. In the 1800s, miners sought profitable veins of gold, silver, and lead along these intrusions. On either side of the pass is evidence of past mining activity. On the ridge to the east of the pass, seemingly out of place, are ash flow tuffs. These rocks originated from volcanic activity in the San Juan volcanic field to the southwest. Eruptions were occurring in the Middle Tertiary (23 to 34 million years ago), approximately the same period granites were being intruded below the surface.

Erosion has since removed most of the tuff and has exposed the intrusive rock that forms the pass today. Contributing to this erosion were Pleistocene glaciers. They sculpted the valleys on both sides of the pass and deposited moraines down valley.
