= Colorado Trail =

Long-distance trail in Colorado

- Length: 486 mi (782 km)
- Location: Colorado, United States
- Trailheads: terminus southwest of Denver 39°29′29″N 105°5′41″W; terminus near Durango 37°19′53″N 107°54′10″W; 27 others
- Use: Hiking, biking and horseback riding
- Highest point: 12 mi (19 km) south of Lake City, 13,271 ft (4,045 m)
- Lowest point: Mouth of Waterton Canyon (Denver terminus), 5,500 ft (1,700 m)
- Difficulty: Moderate to strenuous
- Season: Primarily July–September
- Sights: Rocky Mountains
- Hazards: Severe weather
- Website: http://www.coloradotrail.org

The Colorado Trail is a long-distance trail running for 486 miles (782 km) from the mouth of Waterton Canyon southwest of Denver to Durango in Colorado, United States. Its highest point is 13,271 feet (4,045 m) above sea level, and most of the trail is above 10,000 feet (3,000 m). Despite its high elevation, the trail often dips below the alpine timberline to provide refuge from the exposed, storm-prone regions above.

The Colorado Trail was built and is currently maintained by the non-profit Colorado Trail Foundation and the United States Forest Service, and was connected in 1987.

== Description ==
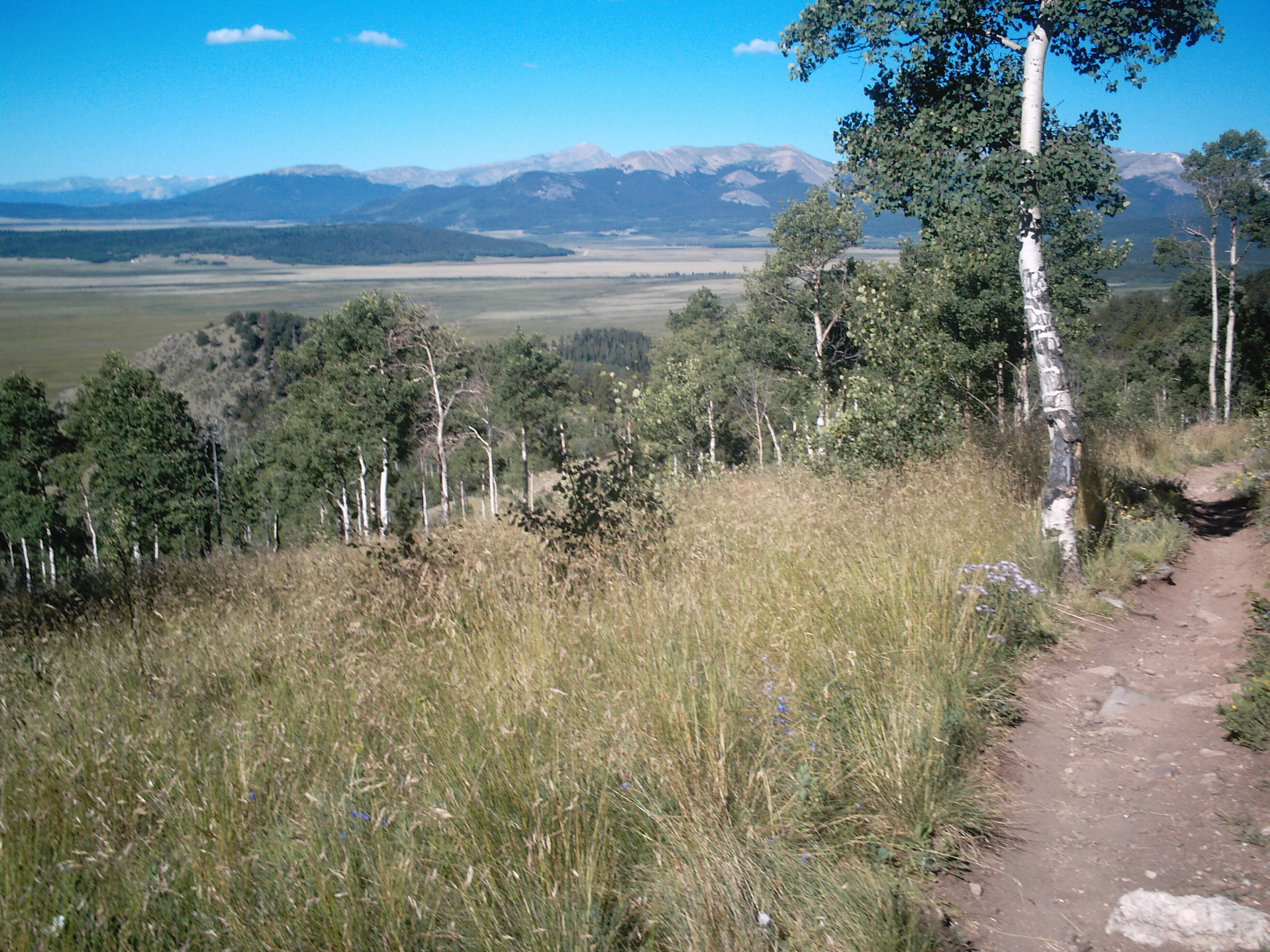
View from The Colorado Trail, overlooking South Park, near Kenosha Pass

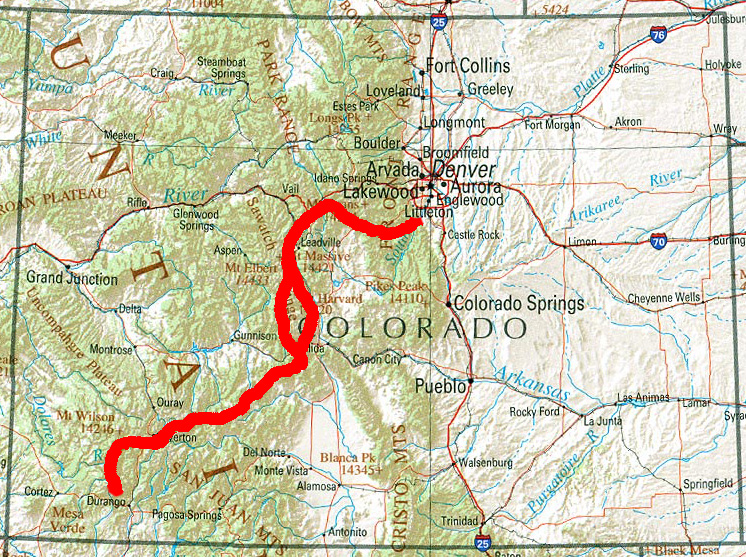
The trail's route, roughly, in red

The Colorado Trail is an established, marked, and mostly non-motorized trail open to hikers, horse riders, and bicyclists. From the eastern terminus at Waterton Canyon, southwest of Denver, the trail winds its way for 486 miles (782 km) through the state's most mountainous regions, ending about 3.5 miles (5.6 km) north of Durango. Along the way, it passes through eight mountain ranges, six National Forests, and six wilderness areas.

Trail elevations range from a low of about 5,500 feet (1,700 m) at the Denver end of the trail to a high of 13,271 feet (4,045 m) on the slopes of Coney in the San Juan Mountains. The trail rises and falls dramatically. A hiker traversing the entire length of the trail will gain (and lose) about 89,000 vertical feet. The trail passes through what is considered to be some of the state's most beautiful country. Wildlife abounds and wildflowers, in season, are abundant. While much of the trail passes through forests, a good portion of it reaches above timberline, where trees are unable to grow and views are breathtaking.

The trail passes through historic mining towns, along ancient Native American trails, and through a modern, world-class ski resort. Other sections appear much as they would have 500 years ago. The western half of The Colorado Trail, between Monarch Pass and Durango, has less human influence, grander vistas and a display of spectacular wildflowers.

For 235 miles (378 km), The Colorado Trail runs concurrent with the Continental Divide Trail along the Collegiate East route. On the Collegiate West route, the Colorado Trail follows the Continental Divide Trail for 80 miles (130 km) more.

== Weather ==
Summer days are warm with cool nights, but unpredictable mountain weather can threaten snow any month of the year. Violent thunder and lightning storms may ravage the afternoon sky, then quickly give way to warm sunshine and cloudless skies. The trail has a stretch of 35 miles between Spring Creek and the top of the Elk Creek drainage that is above tree line and unprotected from thunderstorms.

The practical season for the entire Colorado Trail is roughly July, August and September, though low elevation portions near Denver are often accessible April through June. In the winter, large parts of it are prohibitively difficult because of deep snow.

== Thru-hiking ==
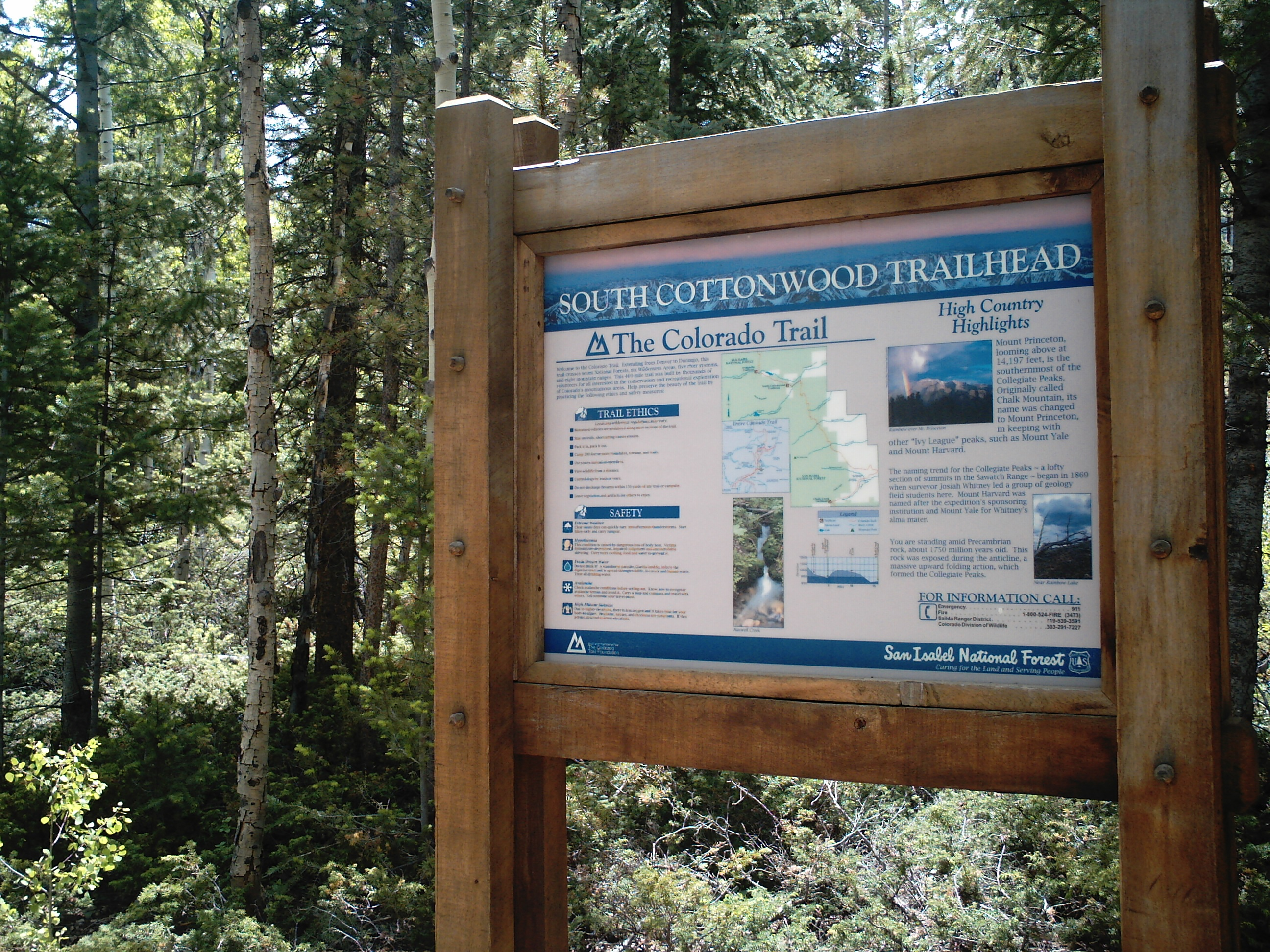
Kiosk for the South Cottonwood trailhead of the Colorado Trail, near Buena Vista, Colorado

The majority of thru-hikers (those who hike the entire trail in one trip) hike from east to west. This choice of direction is preferred partly because snow typically melts earlier in the year on the eastern portion of the trail than on the higher western portion. In addition, the east-to-west hike allows a thru-hiker to start with more gradual elevation gains and build up to the more rugged terrain of the western portion of the trail in the San Juan Mountains.

The time required for a thru-hiker to complete the Colorado Trail varies greatly. While some supported trail runners can finish it in less than 10 days (the unsupported fastest-known time is 9 days, 8 hours and 18 minutes by Jeff Garmire), most thru-hikers spend about 4 to 6 weeks (28 to 42 days) on the trail.

== Mountain biking ==
The Colorado Trail is one of the few major long trails that allow mountain biking. Mountain bikes are permitted along most of the trail, but there are six wilderness areas where it is against federal regulations even to possess a bicycle. As a whole, the trail is of interest to bicyclists from beginners on up. Top cyclists consider it to be a world-class long-distance trail.

== Colorado Trail Foundation ==
The Colorado Trail Foundation, based in Poncha Springs, Colorado, is a nonprofit organization that operates and maintains the Colorado Trail. Assisted by 600 volunteers and 3,000 donors each year, the CTF maintains over 500 miles of trail. Each summer, its trail crews work for about 12 weeks and six weekends clearing trees, working on erosion controls, and maintaining signage along the trail. The trail crews work on major projects that are beyond the scope of its sister "Adopt-A-Trail" program. That program lets interested volunteers "adopt" one of 78 maintenance sections along the trail, each averaging about eight miles long.

Every summer, the CTF offers week-long supported treks on the Trail, providing hikers with guides and the services of the trekking staff.

The Foundation maintains an extensive web site with information about the trail, and publishes a series of books and trail guides for hikers.

=== Governance ===
The CTF is governed by a twelve-person board. There is a full-time Executive Director and one administrative staff member. Its total revenues in 2013 were just over $400,000.

== History ==
The Colorado Trail was conceived in 1973 by the Roundup Riders of the Rockies, but not connected end-to-end until 1987. The Colorado Trail Foundation (CTF) evolved out of cooperative efforts by the United States Forest Service, the Colorado Mountain Trails Foundation, and individual volunteers from the Colorado Mountain Club and the Friends of the Colorado Trail. In 2005, a Memorandum of Understanding was signed by the CTF and Forest Service, detailing their respective roles in the future development of the trail.

== Location coordinates ==
Point	Coordinates (links to map & photo sources)	Notes
Eastern Terminus	39.491325°N 105.094594°W	Waterton Canyon, lowest point: 5,500 ft
Midpoint	38.317105°N 106.512189°W	
Highest Point	37.856781°N 107.345737°W	13,271 ft
Western Terminus	37.331389°N 107.902778°W	Near Durango
