= Ptarmigan (disambiguation) =

Ptarmigan is the common name of birds of the genus Lagopus

Ptarmigan may also refer to:

== Places ==
- Ptarmigan Peak (Alberta), a peak beside Pika Peak in Banff National Park, Alberta, Canada
- Ptarmigan Island, Qikiqtaaluk Region, Nunavut, Canada
- Ptarmigan Lake (Ontario), Canada
- Ptarmigan Peak (Alaska), a mountain in the Chugach Mountains near Anchorage, Alaska, U.S.
- Ptarmigan Pass (Front Range), a pass on the Continental Divide of the Americas in Rocky Mountain National Park, U.S.
- Ptarmigan Pass (Sawatch Range), a pass between Eagle County and Summit County, Colorado, U.S.
- Ptarmigan Peak Wilderness, Colorado, U.S.
- Ptarmigan Lake (Glacier County, Montana), U.S.
- Ptarmigan Tunnel, a tunnel in Glacier National park, Montana, U.S.
- Ptarmigan Traverse, a hiking trail in the North Cascades, Washington, U.S.

== Other uses ==
- USS Ptarmigan (AM-376)
- Ptarmigan (sternwheeler), a Canadian steamboat
- Ptarmigan Airways, a former Canadian airline now part of First Air
- Ptarmigan, part of the British Armed Forces communications and information systems

== See also ==
- Ptarmigan and Tom Mine, gold mines at Yellowknife, Northwest Territories, Canada
- Ptarmigan Creek Provincial Park and Protected Area, British Columbia, Canada
- Ptarmigan Cirque, Alberta, Canada
- Ptarmigan Lake (disambiguation)
- Ptarmigan Pass (disambiguation)
