= Ski lodge =

Ski resort building

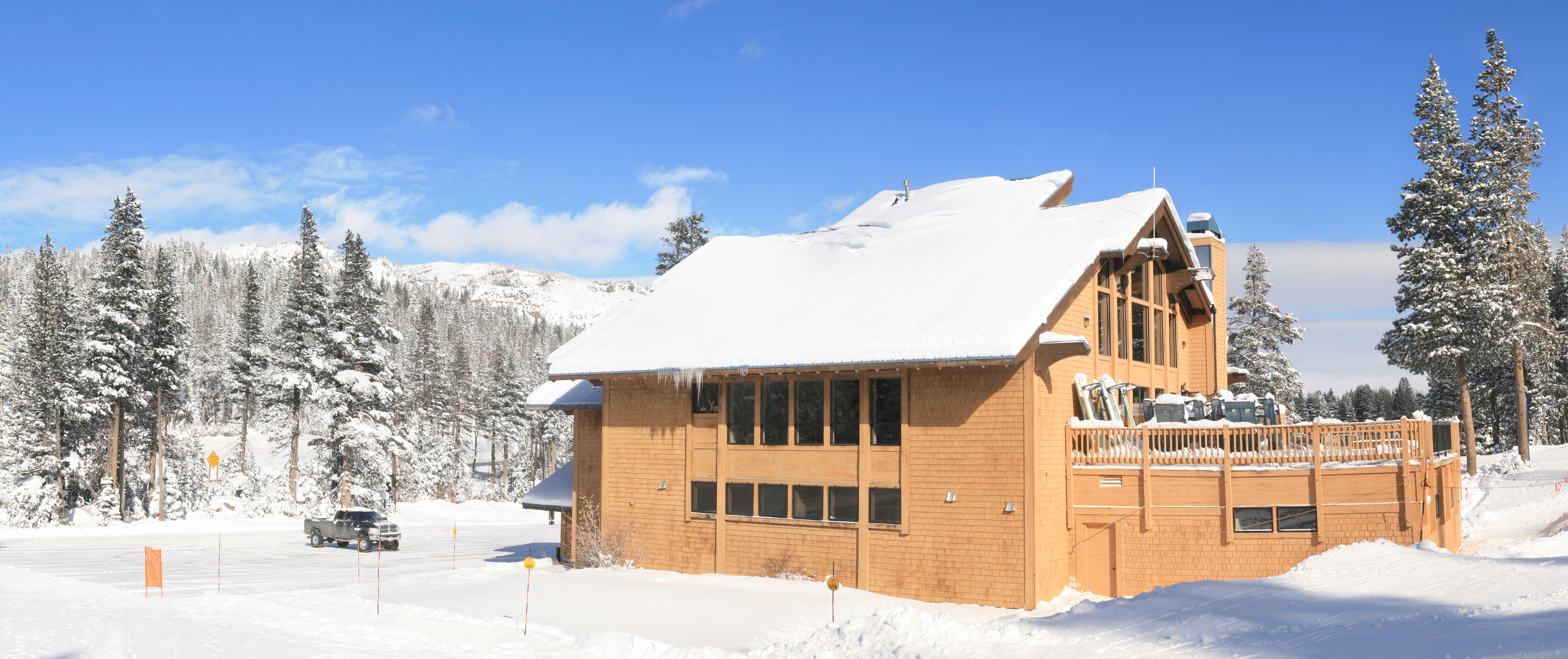
Boreal Mountain Resort ski lodge

A ski lodge or day lodge is a building located in a ski area that provides amenities such as food, beverages, seating area, restrooms, and locker rooms for skiers and snowboarders. Larger resorts have a day lodge at each base area and also at mid-mountain, summit, or remote locations within the ski area.

Ski lodge can also refer to a resort area hotel such as Timberline Lodge in Oregon, or a ski club owned building with meeting space and overnight accommodations for members.

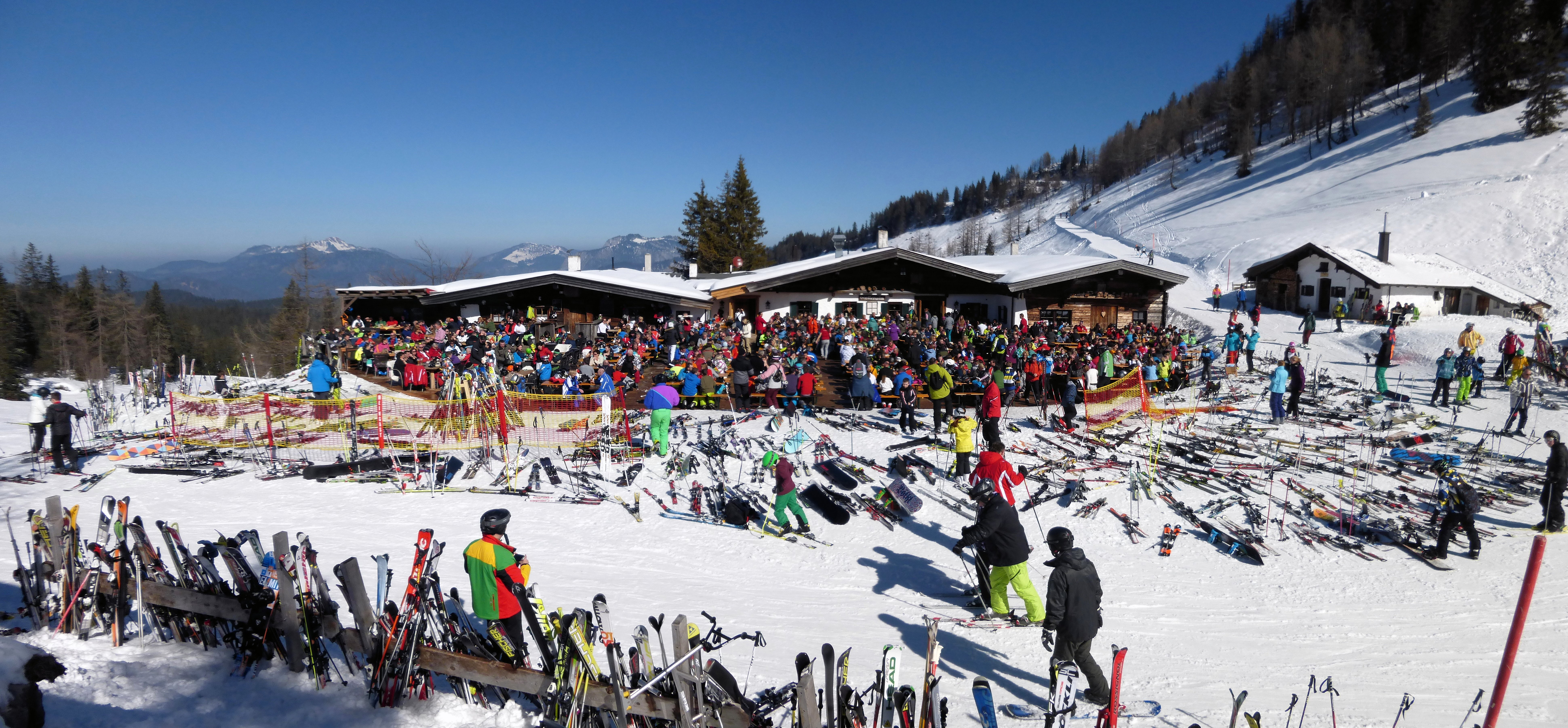
lunch in Tyrol

== Notable ski lodges ==
Notable ski lodges include Skoki Ski Lodge in the Skoki Valley of Alberta, Canada's Banff National Park which was designated a National historic site of Canada in 1992, Badger Pass Ski Lodge in U.S. Yosemite National Park and the Lake Albina Ski Lodge which overlooks Lake Albina in Kosciuszko National Park in Australia.

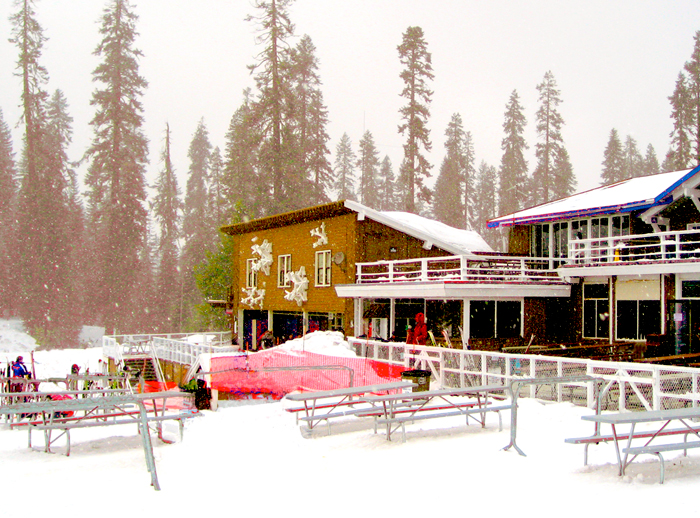
Badger Pass Ski Lodge

== See also ==
- Mountain hut
- Chalet
- Jagdschloss
