= Deception Pass (Alberta) =

Mountain pass in Alberta, Canada

Coordinates: 51.497°N 116.061°W

Deception Pass is a trail in Banff National Park Alberta, Canada. It is named so because it is deceiving in that it looks small but the end never seems to come into sight. It is used to access the Skoki Valley, The Red Deer Lakes, Skoki Mountain and many beautiful smaller alpine lakes. The pass is a challenge for the guests of the Skoki Ski Lodge. It is located between Fossil Mountain and Ptarmigan Peak.
