= Ptarmigan Peak =

Ptarmigan Peak may refer to:

- Ptarmigan Peak (Alaska)
- Ptarmigan Peak (Alberta)
- Ptarmigan Peak (Baranof Island), Alaska
- Ptarmigan Peak (Colorado)
- Ptarmigan Peak (Washington)
