= Ptarmigan Lake =

Ptarmigan Lake may refer to:

== Lakes ==
=== In Canada ===
- In Alberta:
  - Ptarmigan Lake (Alberta), an alpine lake at the foot of Ptarmigan Peak in Banff National Park
  - Ptarmigan Lake at 53° 32′ 13″ North 119° 36′ 29″ West
- In British Columbia:
  - Ptarmigan Lake in Cassiar Land District at 56° 29′ 04″ North 130° 12′ 10″ West
  - Ptarmigan Lake in Coast Land District at 52° 16′ 59″ North 125° 54′ 00″ West
  - Ptarmigan Lake in Kootenay Land District at 50° 10′ 59″ North 115° 31′ 59″ West
  - Ptarmigan Lake in Range 5 Coast Land District at 54° 03′ 00″ North 130° 01′ 59″ West
- Ptarmigan Lake (Manitoba), at 55° 06′ 38″ North 101° 03′ 51″ West
- Ptarmigan Lake (Newfoundland and Labrador), at 53° 48′ 00″ North 62° 04′ 56″ West
- Ptarmigan Lake (Northwest Territories), at 63° 36′ 00″ North 107° 26′ 03″ West
- Ptarmigan Lake (Nunavut), at 76° 22′ 59″ North 92° 55′ 59″ West
- Ptarmigan Lake (Ontario), in Cochrane District

Source for lakes in Canada: search on Atlas of Canada retrieved 2010-02-07.

=== In the United States ===
- Ptarmigan Lake (Glacier County, Montana) located in Glacier National Park, Montana

== See also ==
- Ptarmigan (disambiguation)
