= Ptarmigan Lake (Alberta) =

Lake in Alberta, Canada

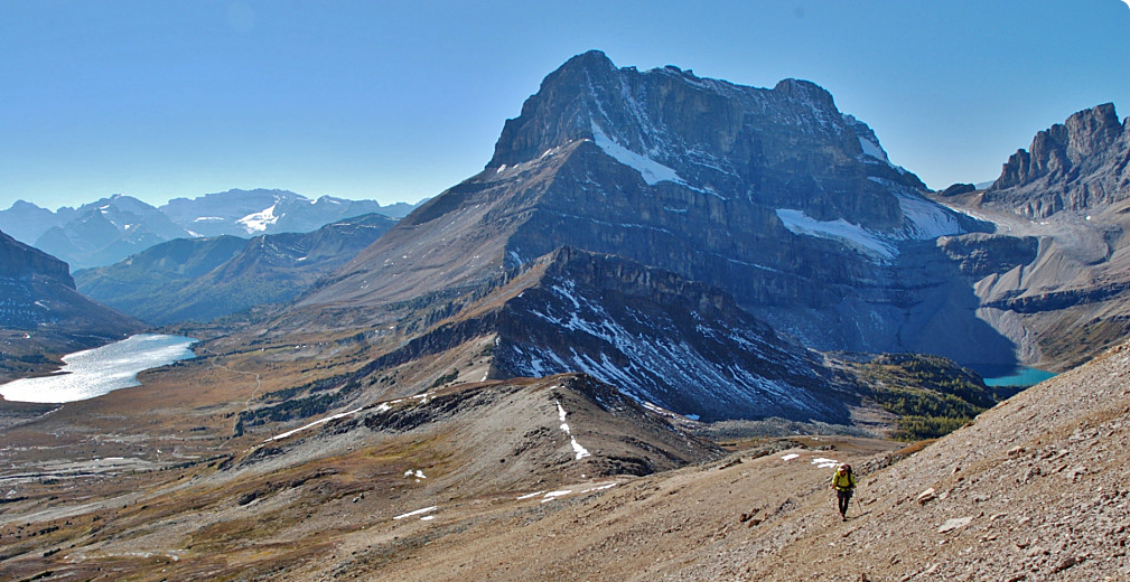
- Ptarmigan Lake to the left of Ptarmigan Peak

- Location within Alberta
- Location: Banff National Park, Alberta
- Coordinates: 51.484°N 116.077°W
- Type: Freshwater
- Part of: Baker Lake Drainage Basin
- Primary inflows: Surface runoff
- Primary outflows: Ptarmigan Creek
- Basin countries: Canada
- Surface area: 0.279 km^{2} (0.108 sq mi)
- Average depth: 7.0 m (23.0 ft)
- Max. depth: 21.3 m (70 ft)
- Water volume: 0.00195 km^{3} (0.00047 cu mi)
- Residence time: 156 days (summer)
- Surface elevation: 2,332 m (7,651 ft)

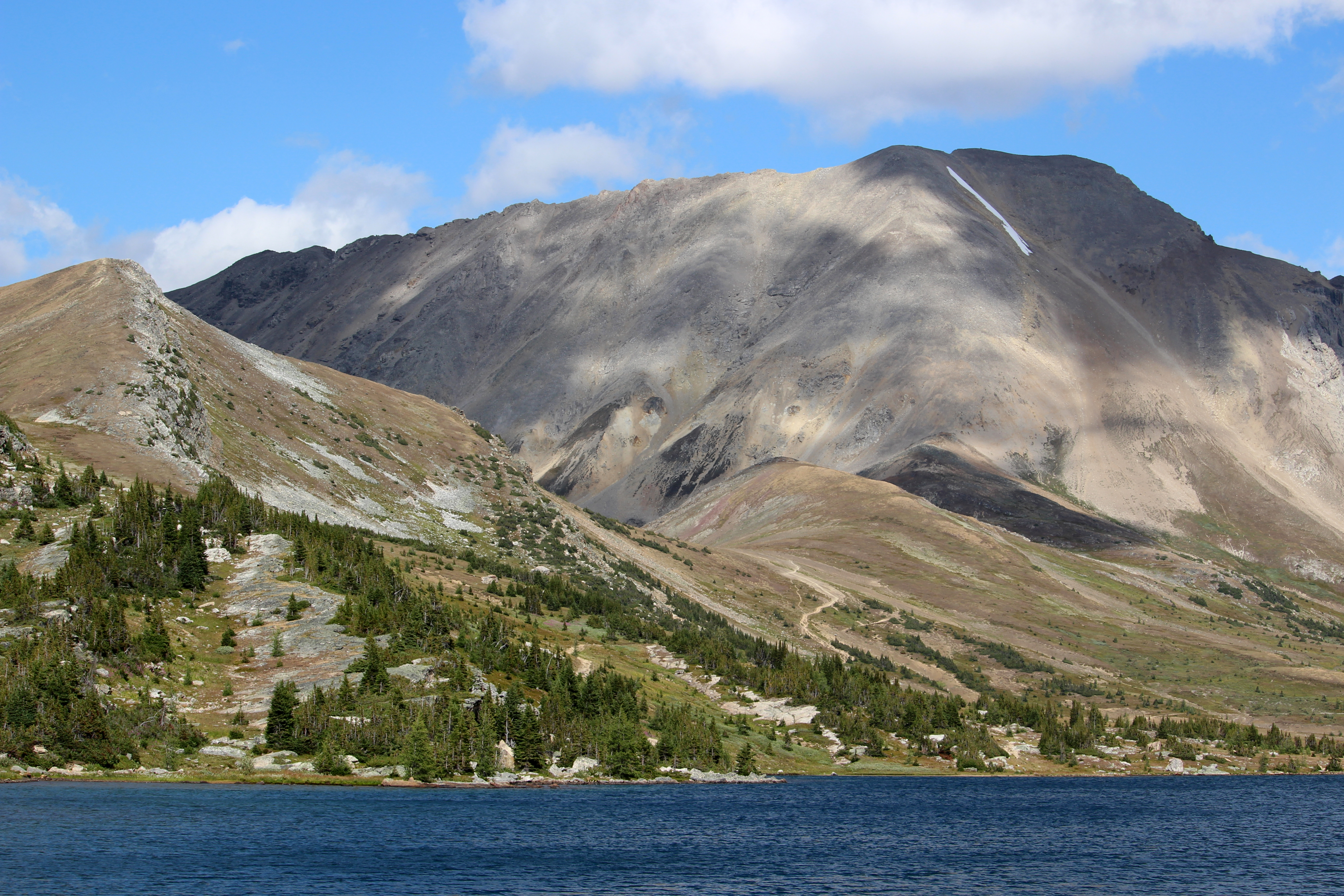
Fossil Mountain seen from Ptarmigan Lake

Ptarmigan Lake is an alpine lake at the foot of Ptarmigan Peak. The main access to the lake is a hiking and skiing trail which begins near the Lake Louise Mountain Resort. The lake drains eastward into Baker Lake and then into Baker Creek, which flows into the Bow River. The Skoki Ski Lodge is located beyond the lake and over Deception Pass.
