= Lipalian Mountain =

Mountain in Banff NP, Canada

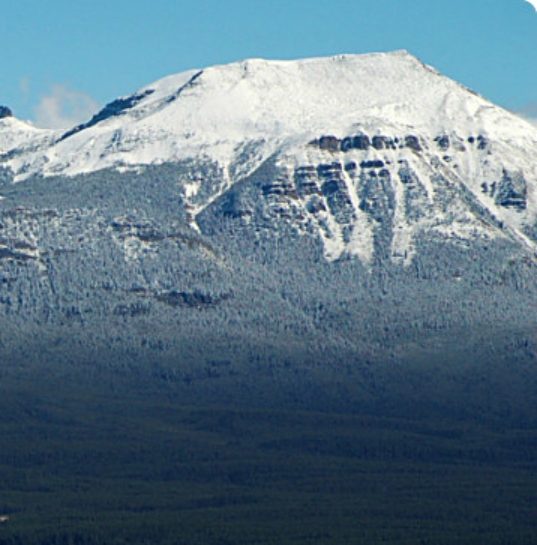

Highest point
- Elevation: 2,682 m (8,799 ft) (Note: Other sources state 2710 m.)
- Prominence: 182 m (597 ft) (Note: Based on a summit elevation of 2710 m.)
- Parent peak: Redoubt Mountain (2902 m)
- Listing: Mountains of Alberta
- Coordinates: 51°25′37″N 116°05′50″W

Geography
- Location within Alberta Location within Canada
- Country: Canada
- Province: Alberta
- Parent range: Slate Range; Canadian Rockies
- Topo map: NTS 82N8 Lake Louise

Climbing
- Easiest route: Easy Scramble

Lipalian Mountain is a 2,682-metre (8,799-foot) mountain summit located in Banff National Park, in the Slate Range of the Canadian Rockies of Alberta, Canada. It was named by William C. Gussow in 1958.

The Larch Area of the Lake Louise Ski Resort is located on its lower west slope, while the majority of the resort's skiable terrain is located on the slopes of Whitehorn Mountain, immediately west of Lipalian Mountain. The resort's Temple Lodge (dining only) is located in the valley between the two mountains and is only open during the ski season and is accessible on skis/snowboard only (no public road).

Lipalian was a geological era proposed by American paleontologist Charles Walcott for a time where there is no record of fossils during a period of the Cambrian explosion. The theory was later refuted.

== Geology ==
The mountains in Banff Park are composed of sedimentary rock laid down during the Precambrian to Jurassic periods. Formed in shallow seas, this sedimentary rock was pushed east and over the top of younger rock during the Laramide orogeny.

== Climate ==
Based on the Köppen climate classification, the mountain experiences a subarctic climate with cold, snowy winters, and mild summers. The Lake Louise Ski Resort is located to the immediate northwest of the peak. Temperatures can drop below −20 °C (−4 °F) with wind chill factors below −30 °C (−22 °F) in the winter.

== Gallery ==
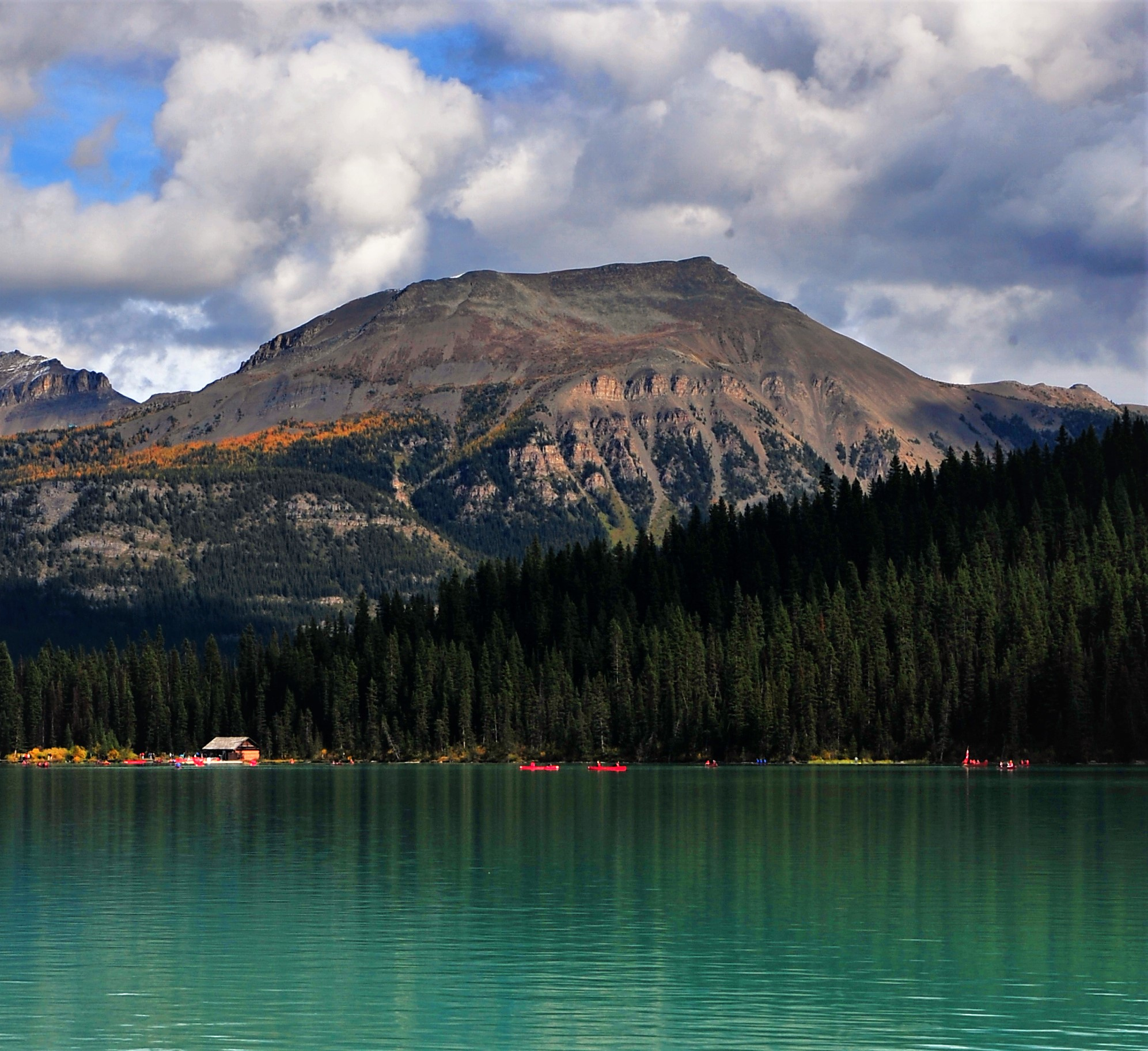
Lipalian Mountain from Lake Louise

== See also ==
- Geography of Alberta
