= Ptarmigan Pass =

Ptarmigan Pass may refer to:

- Ptarmigan Pass (Alaska), associated with Ptarmigan Peak in the Chugach Mountains, Alaska, United States
- Ptarmigan Pass (Front Range), a mountain pass on the Continental Divide of the Americas in Rocky Mountain National Park, United States
- Ptarmigan Pass (Sawatch Range), a mountain pass between Eagle County and Summit County, Colorado, United States
- Ptarmigan Pass (Williams Fork Mountains), a mountain pass between Grand County and Summit County, Colorado, United States

== See also ==
- Ptarmigan (disambiguation)
- List of mountain passes
