= Fossil Mountain (Alberta) =

Mountain in Alberta, Canada

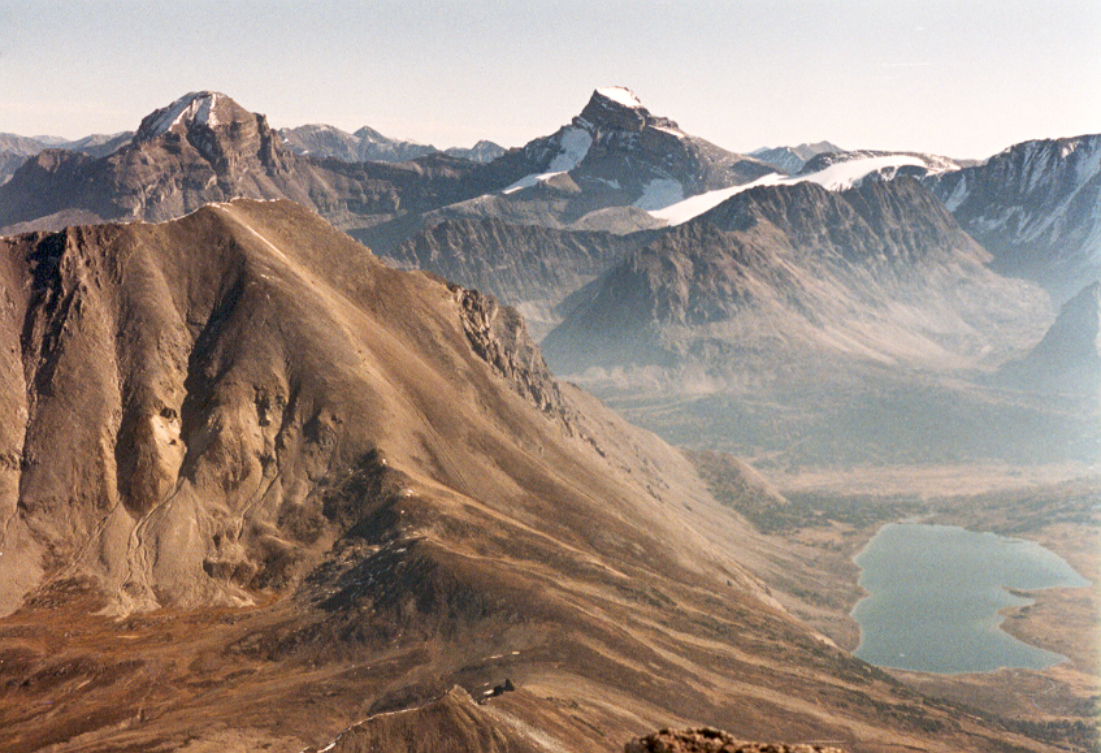
- Fossil Mountain to left in front

Highest point
- Elevation: 2,946 m (9,665 ft)
- Prominence: 471 m (1,545 ft)
- Parent peak: Mount Richardson
- Listing: Mountains of Alberta
- Coordinates: 51°30′11″N 116°02′46″W

Geography
- Location within Alberta
- Location: Alberta, Canada
- Parent range: Slate Range
- Topo map: NTS 82N9 Hector Lake

Climbing
- First ascent: 1906
- Easiest route: Easy scramble

Fossil Mountain is a mountain located south of Skoki Mountain in Banff National Park, Canada. The mountain was named in 1906 by M.P. Bridgland, of the first ascent party, after the numerous fossils that can be found on its slopes.

Fossil Mountain is the site of the first known skiing fatality in the Canadian Rockies. On April 7, 1933, Raymond Paley died in a slab avalanche when he attempted to ski down the mountain after skiing almost to the top.

In February 1988, cousins Dan and Wayne Hugo (29 and 27 respectively) were hiking and skiing on Fossil Mountain when an avalanche, which they may have triggered, occurred. They both died.

== Routes ==
The scrambling route ascends easy scree slopes from Deception Pass. Due to these easy slopes, the mountain is sometimes ascended in winter by skiers.

== Gallery ==
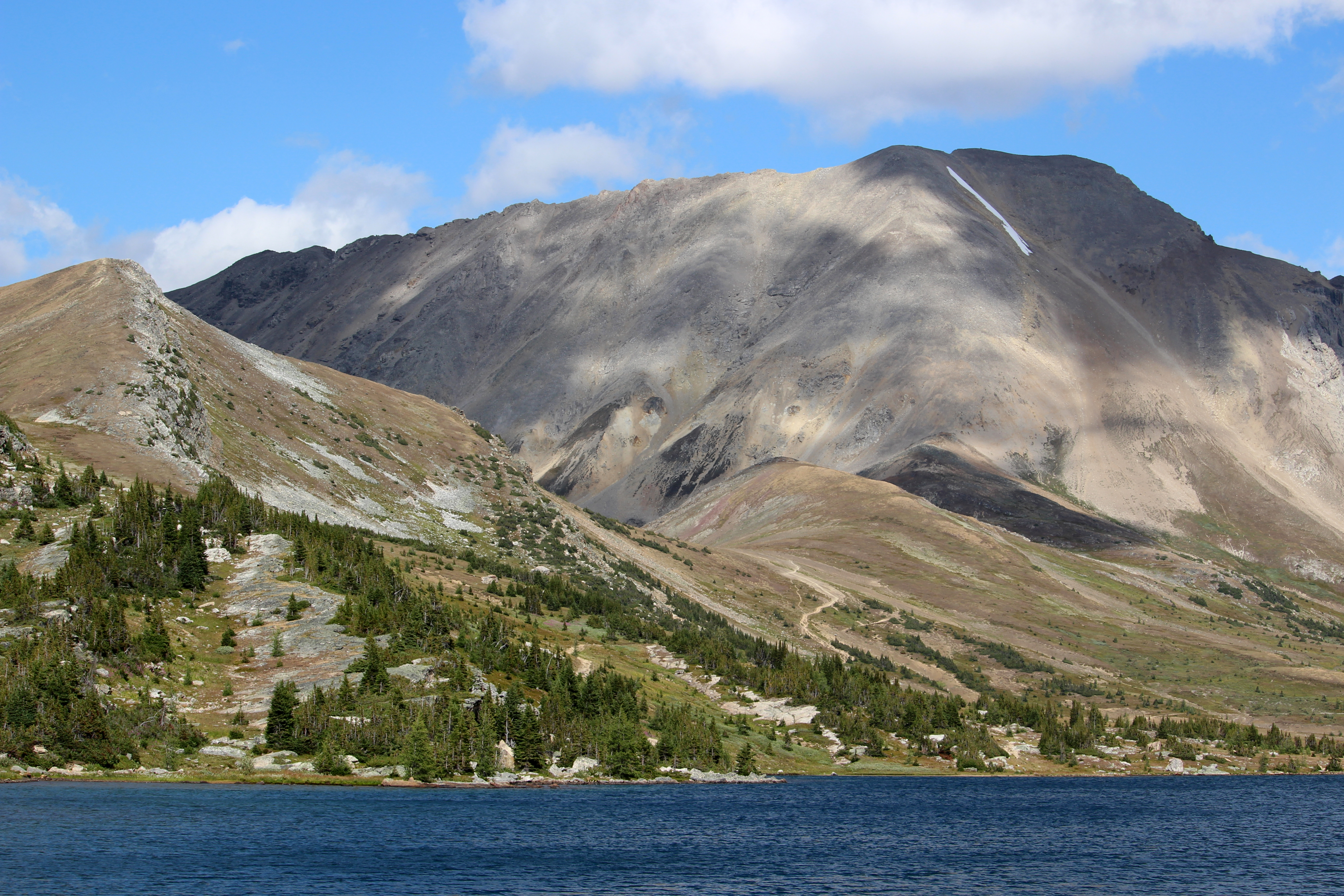
Fossil Mountain seen from Ptarmigan Lake
