= Hidden Lake (Alberta) =

Lake in Banff NP, Alberta, Canada

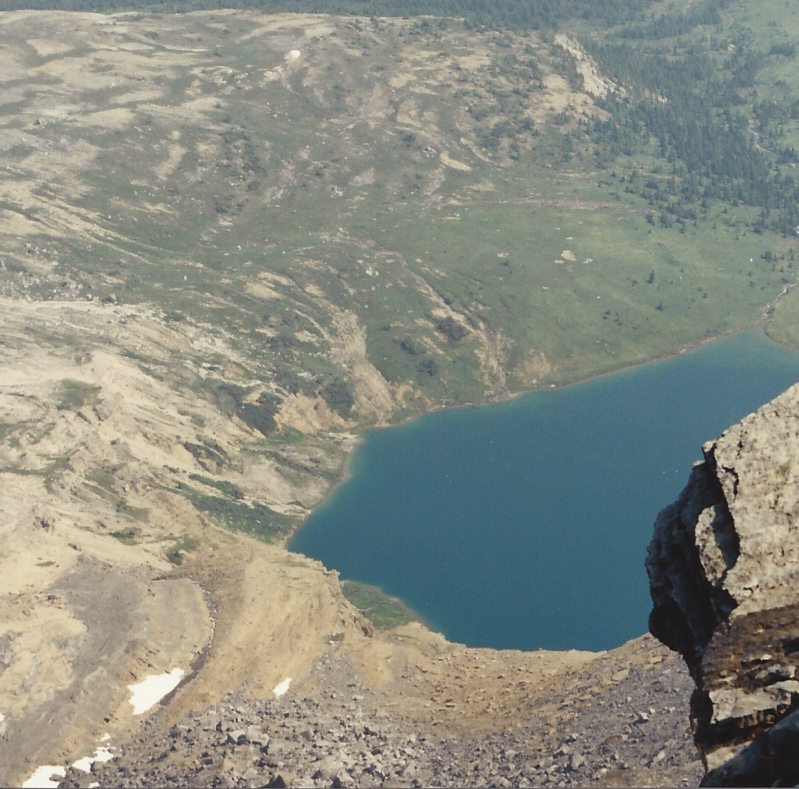
- Hidden Lake from Mount Richardson

- Location within Alberta
- Location: Slate Range, Banff National Park, Alberta
- Coordinates: 51°29′05″N 116°06′31″W
- Type: Glacial lake
- Primary outflows: Corral Creek
- Basin countries: Canada
- Max. length: 405 m (1,329 ft)
- Max. width: 380 m (1,250 ft)
- Surface area: 0.4 km^{2} (0.15 sq mi)
- Max. depth: Unknown
- Surface elevation: 2,300 m (7,500 ft)

Hidden Lake is a small glacial lake in the Skoki Valley of Banff National Park, Canada. It is located in the Slate Range of the Canadian Rockies.

The lake can be reached by following a hiking trail for 8.4 km (5.2 mi) starting at Fish Creek, at the base of the Lake Louise Ski Area, near Lake Louise. A backcountry campground is situated one km before reaching the lake. The lake is the starting point for possible ascents of Mount Richardson, Pika Peak and Ptarmigan Peak.

The glacial waters of the lake are drained by Corral Creek through the Sikoki Valley into the Bow River.

== See also ==
- List of lakes of Alberta
