= Whitehorn Mountain =

Whitehorn Mountain may refer to

- Whitehorn Mountain (Alberta) in Banff National Park, Alberta
- Whitehorn Mountain (British Columbia)
