= Anthozoan Mountain =

Mountain in Alberta, Canada

- Location within Alberta

Highest point
- Elevation: 2,695 m (8,842 ft)
- Prominence: 304 m (997 ft)
- Listing: Mountains of Alberta
- Coordinates: 51°27′46″N 116°01′39″W

Geography
- Country: Canada
- Province: Alberta
- Protected area: Banff National Park
- Parent range: Slate Range
- Topo map: NTS 82N8 Lake Louise

Climbing
- First ascent: 1911 J.F. Porter and party
- Easiest route: Scrambling on west slopes

Anthozoan Mountain is a mountain in the Slate Range of Alberta, Canada. Named in 1925, fossilized anthozoans (i.e. coral) are found in the Devonian limestone of the mountain.
