= Skoki Mountain =

Mountain in Alberta, Canada

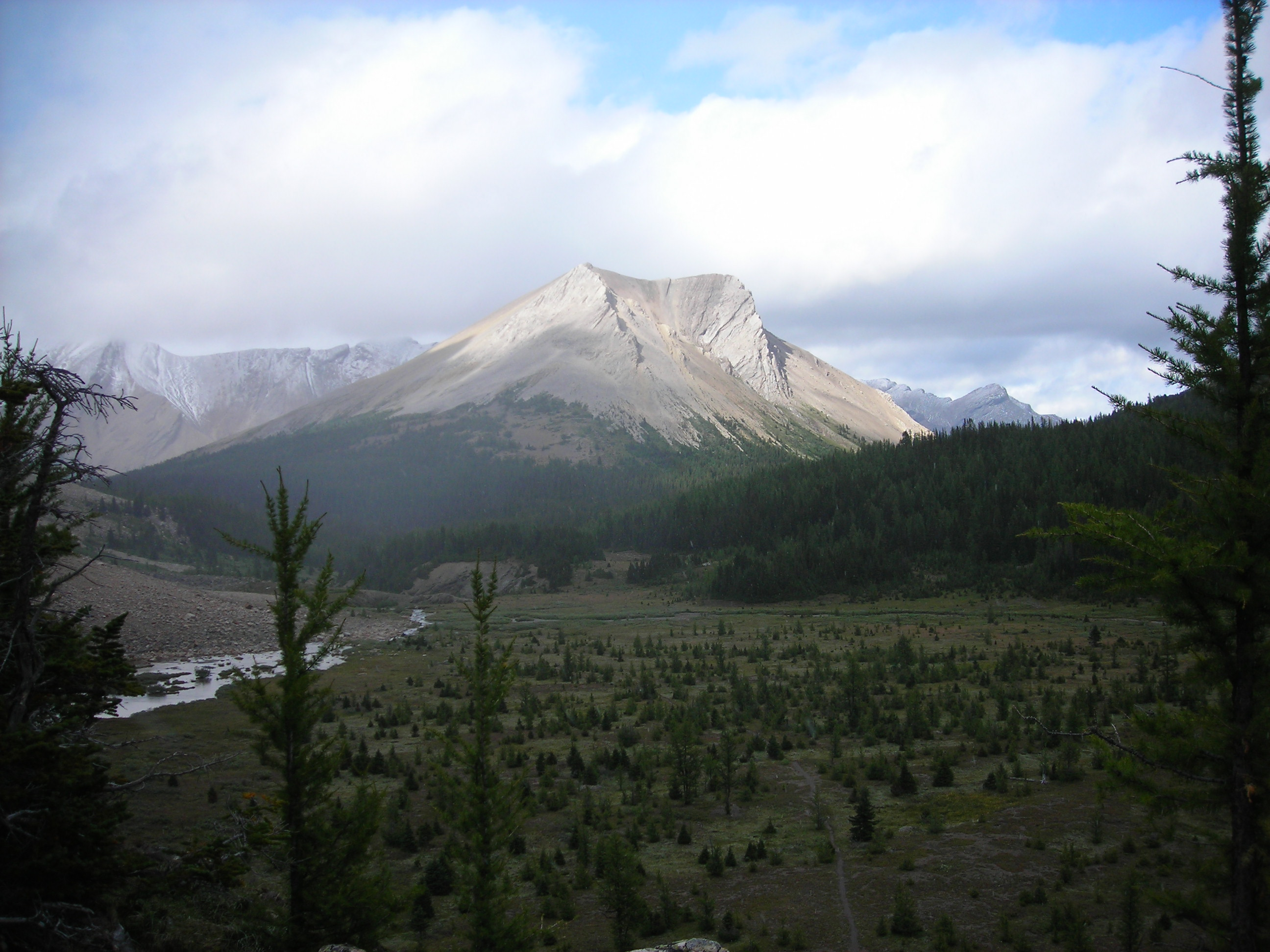
- Skoki Mountain in August 2008

Highest point
- Elevation: 2,707 m (8,881 ft)
- Prominence: 482 m (1,581 ft)
- Coordinates: 51°31′48″N 116°03′36″W

Geography
- Location within Alberta
- Location: Alberta, Canada
- Parent range: Slate Range
- Topo map: NTS 82N9 Hector Lake

Skoki Mountain is a mountain located in Banff National Park in Alberta, Canada. It is situated towards the east of the Skoki Valley, at the head of the Red Deer River, and is part of the Slate Range. At the base of the mountain lies Skoki Lodge, a historic ski lodge constructed in 1931, where several routes up to the 2,707 m (8,881 ft) peak originate.

Skoki Mountain was named by James F. Porter in 1911 after the Indian word for marsh or swamp.
