= Lake Albina Ski Lodge =

Former ski lodge in New South Wales, Australia

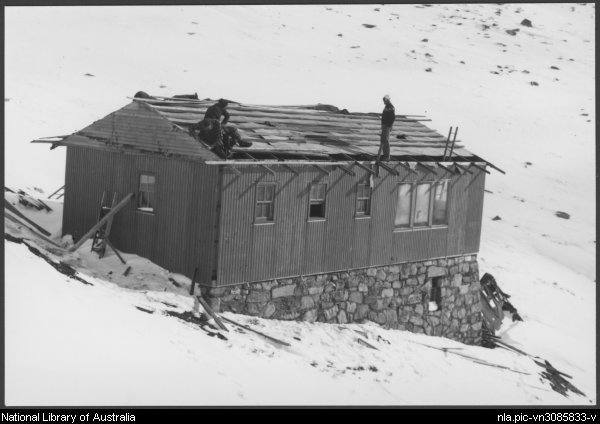
- Finishing touches to the Albina Ski Lodge, 1951.

General information
- Year built: 1951

Lake Albina Ski Lodge was built overlooking Lake Albina in the Kosciuszko National Park of Australia, by The Ski Tourers Association, (later renamed The Australian Alpine Club). In 1952 the first Albina Summer Slalom Cup was held, taking advantage of the seasonally unusual snow conditions. Summer time ski events continued for at least another 3 years on either Mount Kosciuszko or Mount Townsend. The National Parks and Wildlife Service (NPWS) required the club to vacate the lodge in 1969, and it gradually became a ruin. It was finally demolished by NPWS in 1983 .

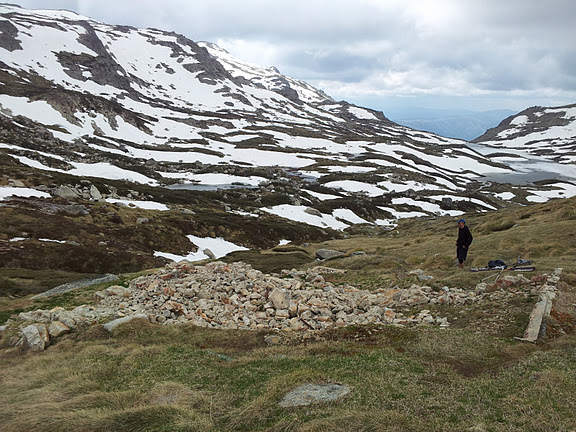
A skier assessing the ruins of Albina Ski Lodge, November 2011. Photo by Leigh Blackall
