= Heather Ridge =

Ridge in Alberta, Canada

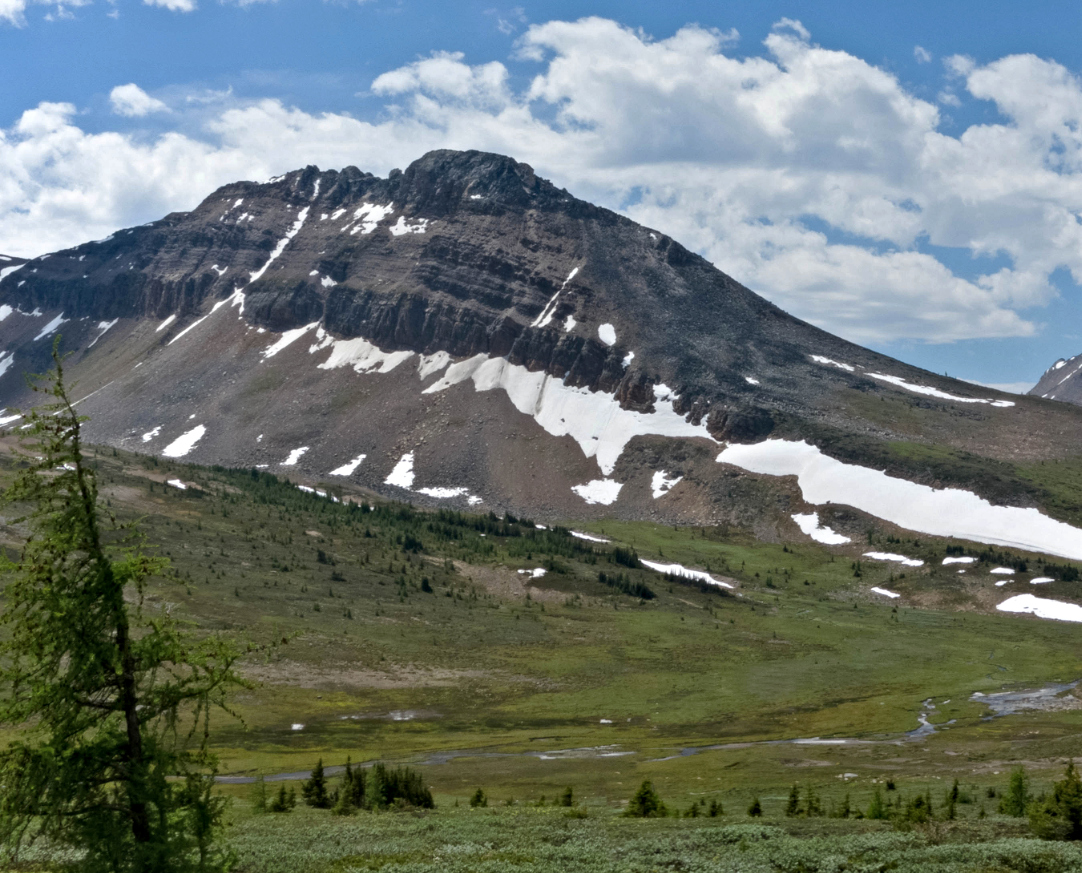

Highest point
- Elevation: 2,636 m (8,648 ft)
- Prominence: 213 m (699 ft)
- Listing: Mountains of Alberta
- Coordinates: 51°28′21″N 116°03′05″W

Geography
- Location within Alberta
- Country: Canada
- Province: Alberta
- Protected area: Banff National Park
- Parent range: Slate Range
- Topo map: NTS 82N8 Lake Louise

Heather Ridge is located in the Slate Range in Alberta. Like other mountains in Banff Park, Heather Ridge is composed of sedimentary rock laid down during the Precambrian to Jurassic periods. Formed in shallow seas, this sedimentary rock was pushed east and over the top of younger rock during the Laramide orogeny.

== Climate ==
Based on the Köppen climate classification, Heather Ridge is located in a subarctic climate zone with cold, snowy winters, and mild summers. Temperatures can drop below −20 °C with wind chill factors below −30 °C.

== See also ==
- Geography of Alberta
- Geology of Alberta
