= Pika Peak =

Mountain in Alberta, Canada

- Location within Alberta

Highest point
- Elevation: 3,053 m (10,016 ft)
- Prominence: 13 m (43 ft)
- Listing: Mountains of Alberta
- Coordinates: 51°29′47″N 116°06′24″W

Geography
- Country: Canada
- Province: Alberta
- Protected area: Banff National Park
- Parent range: Slate Range
- Topo map: NTS 82N8 Lake Louise

Climbing
- First ascent: 1911
- Easiest route: Difficult Scramble

Pika Peak is a mountain located between Mount Richardson and Ptarmigan Peak in Banff National Park, Alberta, Canada The mountain was named in 1928 after the pika, the small "rock rabbit" that inhabits alpine regions.

The Lake Louise Mountain Resort is developed on the southern slopes of the Merlin Ridge, which includes Mount Richardson, Ptarmigan Peak and Pika Peak. A campground is located at the foot of the mountain, near Hidden Lake.

The first ascent was made in 1911 by L.L. Delafield and L.M. Earle, who were guided by Rudolph Aemmer and Edward Feuz jr.

== Routes ==
The scrambling route via the Richardson-Pika col and the west ridge is rated difficult. Either gain the col by ascending Mt. Richardson (easy scramble) or by attacking the lower flanks of Pika Peak above Hidden Lake.

== See also ==
- List of mountains in the Canadian Rockies
