= Redoubt Mountain =

Mountain in Banff NP, Alberta, Canada

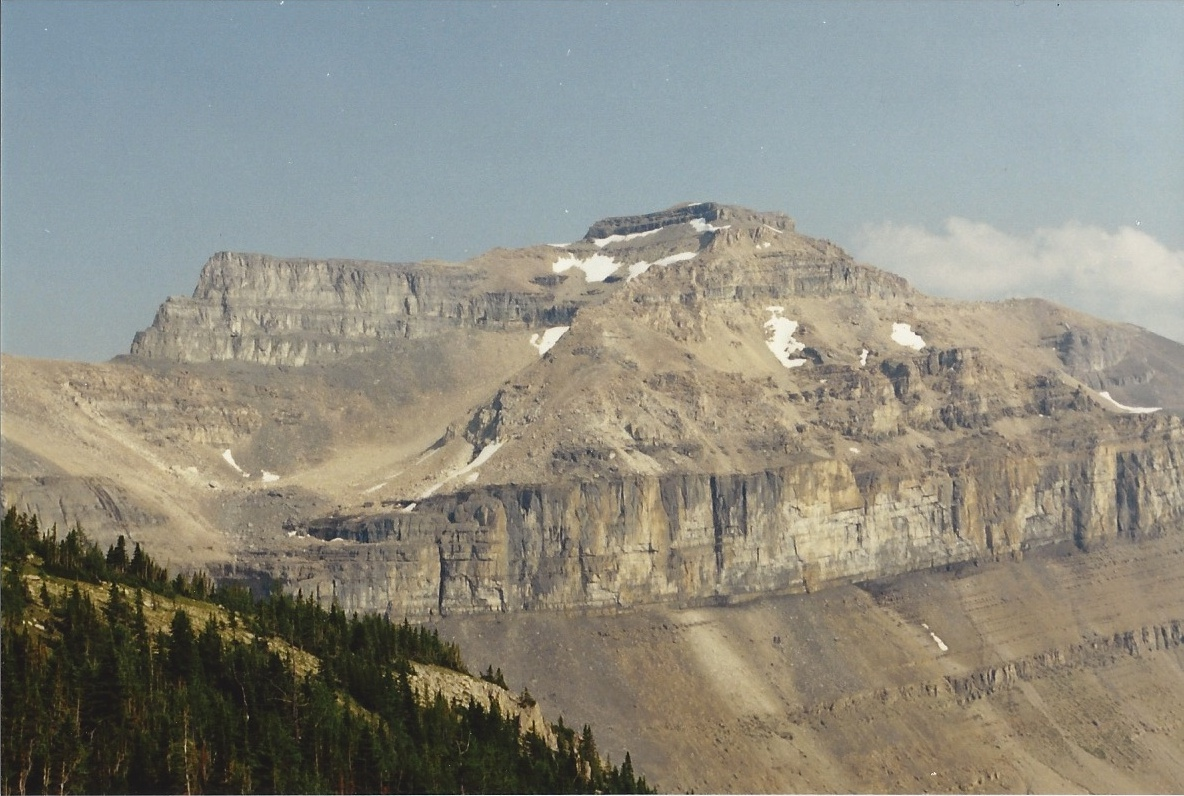
- Redoubt Mountain, August 1994. Viewpoint from Hidden Lake.

Highest point
- Elevation: 2,902 m (9,521 ft)
- Prominence: 570 m (1,870 ft)
- Parent peak: Mount Richardson (3086 m)
- Listing: Mountains of Alberta
- Coordinates: 51°28′02″N 116°04′52″W

Geography
- Location within Alberta Location within Canada
- Country: Canada
- Province: Alberta
- Protected area: Banff National Park
- Parent range: Slate Range
- Topo map: NTS 82N8 Lake Louise

Geology
- Rock age: Cambrian
- Rock type: Sedimentary

Climbing
- First ascent: 1906
- Easiest route: moderate/difficult scramble

Redoubt Mountain (alternatively Mount Redoubt) is a mountain located in Banff National Park, in the Canadian Rockies of Alberta, Canada. It forms the southern buttress of Boulder Pass.

The mountain was named in 1908 by Arthur O. Wheeler, founding member of the Alpine Club of Canada (AAC), as it resembled a redoubt (an outer military defense).

The mountain can be climbed on a moderate to difficult scrambling route on the northwestern ridge.

Like other mountains in Banff Park, it is composed of sedimentary rock laid down from the Precambrian to Jurassic periods. Formed in shallow seas, this sedimentary rock was pushed east and over the top of younger rock during the Laramide orogeny.

Based on the Köppen climate classification, the mountain is located in a subarctic climate with cold, snowy winters, and mild summers. Temperatures can drop below -20 °C with wind chill factors below -30 °C.

== Gallery ==
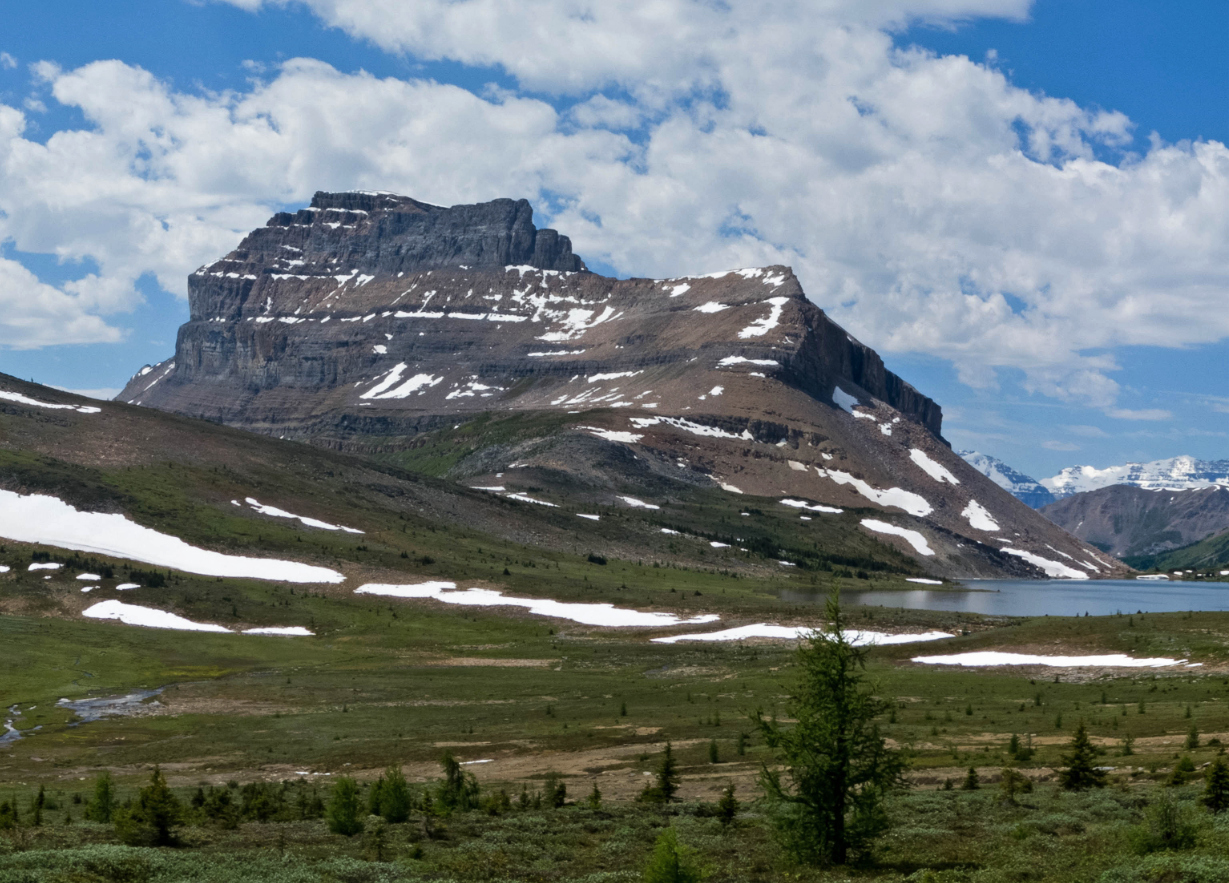
Redoubt Mountain from Skoki valley area

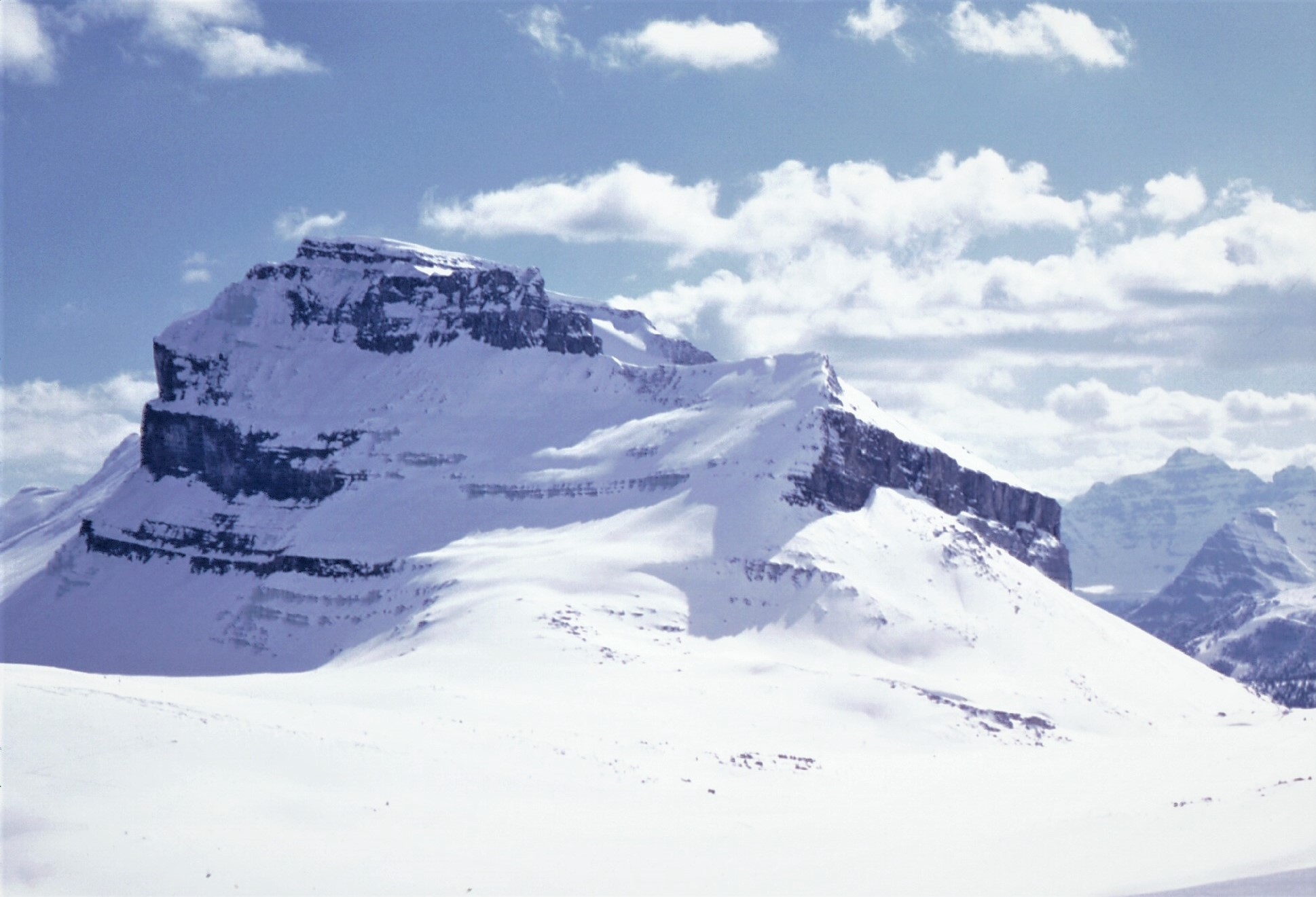
Northeast aspect

== See also ==
- List of mountains of Canada
- Geology of Alberta
