= Lake Albina =

Lake in Australia

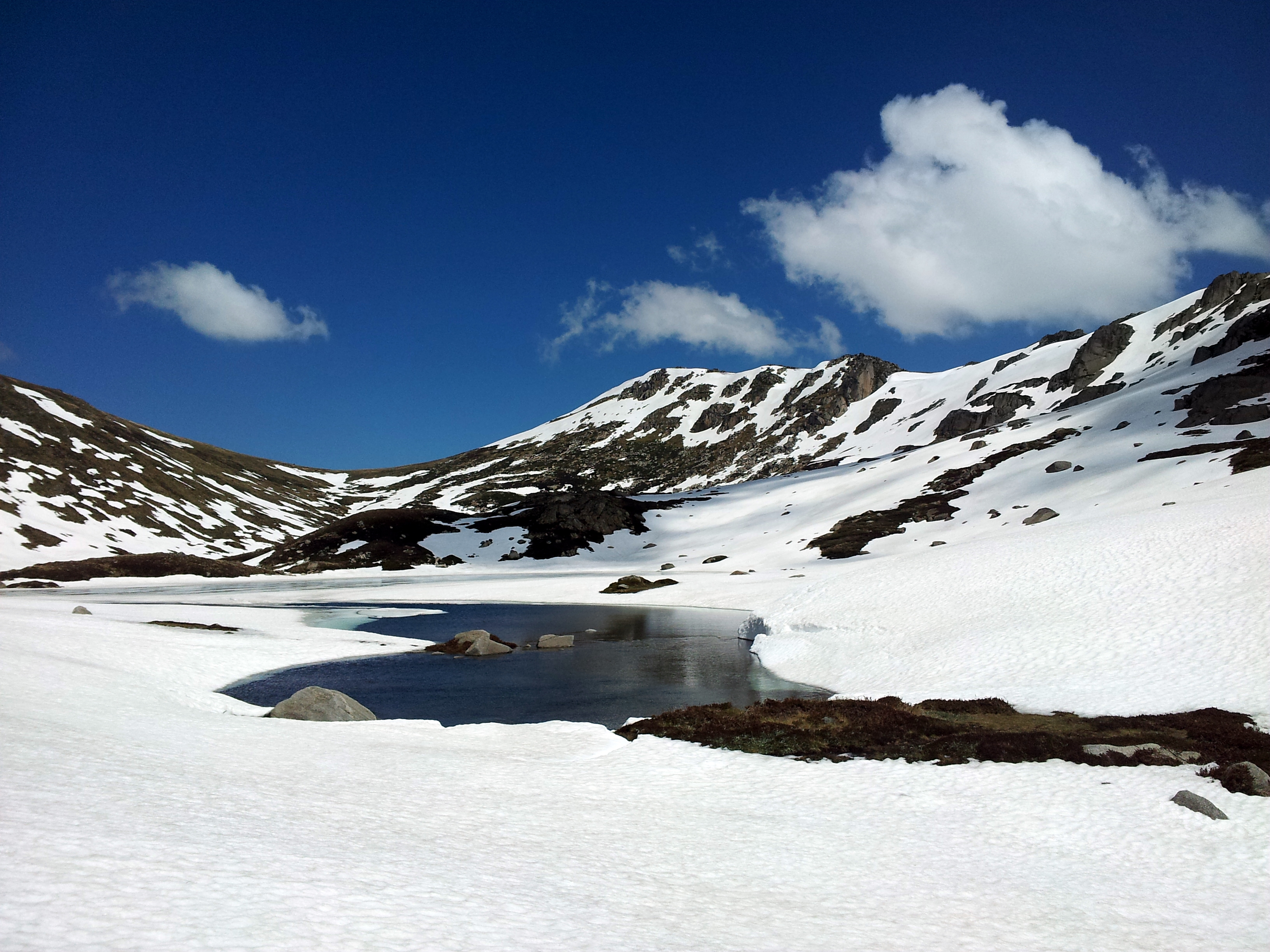
- Lake Albina from downstream in late October 2011.

- Location in New South Wales
- Location: Snowy Mountains, New South Wales
- Coordinates: 36°25′30″S 148°16′30″E
- Type: Glacial cirque
- Primary outflows: Geehi River
- Basin countries: Australia
- Designation: Kosciuszko National Park; Australian Alps National Parks and Reserves
- Max. length: 500 m (1,600 ft)
- Max. width: 50 m (160 ft)
- Surface area: 6,600 m^{2} (71,000 sq ft)
- Surface elevation: 1,920 m (6,300 ft)
- Frozen: June–September

Lake Albina is a glacial lake in the Snowy Mountains region of New South Wales, Australia. The lake is located within the Kosciuszko National Park and the Australian Alps National Parks and Reserves.

Lake Albina is about 2.5 kilometres (1.6 mi) north of Mount Kosciuszko, the highest mountain in Australia. The 6,600-square-metre (71,000 sq ft) lake is approximately 500 metres (1,600 ft) long and 50 metres (160 ft) wide. It is located in a ravine, with Mount Townsend to the west and Mount Lee and Mount Northcote to the east. Lake Albina drains northwards towards the Geehi River through Lady Northcote's canyon.

== Ski lodge ==
The Lake Albina Ski Lodge was built in 1951 by The Ski Tourers Association (later renamed The Australian Alpine Club), overlooking the lake from upstream. In 1952 the first Albina Summer Slalom Cup was held, taking advantage of the seasonally unusual snow conditions. Summer time ski events continued for at least another three years on either Mount Kosciuszko or Mount Townsend. The National Parks and Wildlife Service (NPWS) required the club to vacate the lodge in 1969, and it gradually became a ruin. It was finally demolished by NPWS in 1983.

== Gallery ==
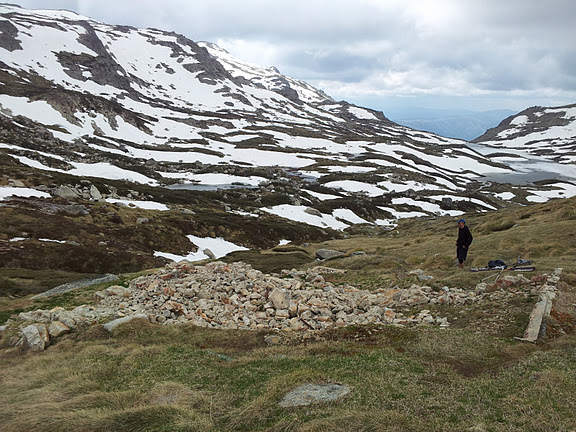
A skier assessing the ruins of Albina Ski Lodge, November 2011.

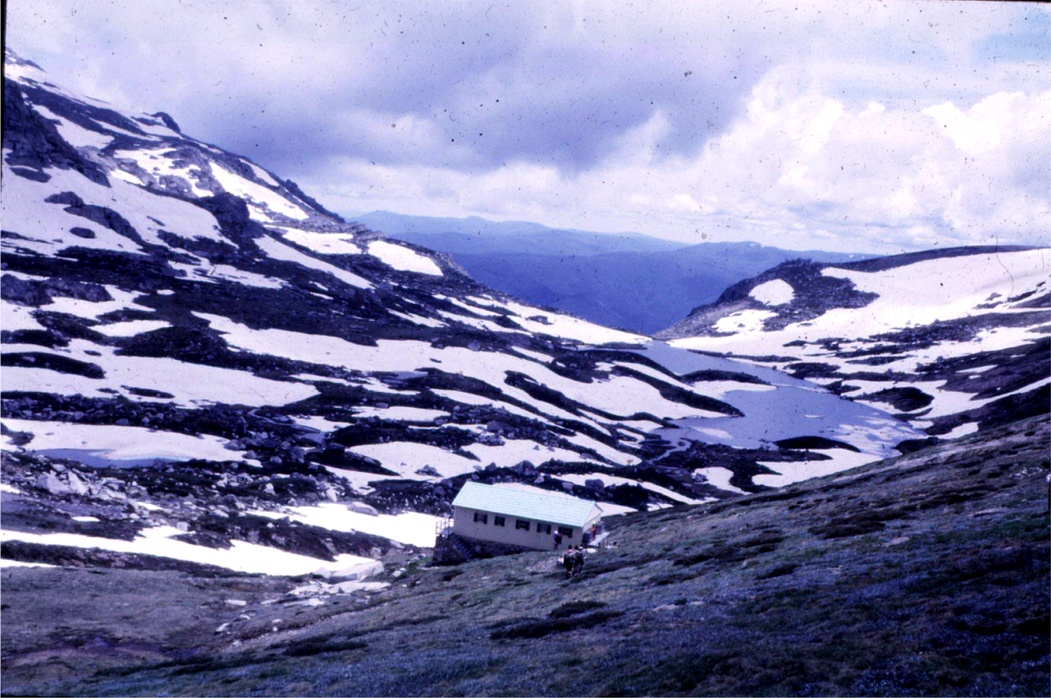
Lake Albina Ski Lodge one year after government forced it to be vacated.
