= Brachiopod Mountain =

Mountain in Alberta, Canada

- Location within Alberta Location within Canada

Highest point
- Elevation: 2,667 m (8,750 ft)
- Prominence: 152 m (499 ft)
- Listing: Mountains of Alberta
- Coordinates: 51°28′43″N 116°02′13″W

Geography
- Country: Canada
- Province: Alberta
- Protected area: Banff National Park
- Parent range: Canadian Rockies; Slate Range
- Topo map: NTS 82N8 Lake Louise

Climbing
- First ascent: 1911 J.F. Porter and party
- Easiest route: Scrambling Routes west slopes

Brachiopod Mountain was named by James F. Porter for the fossil brachiopods found in the Devonian limestone of the mountain. It is located in the Slate Range, a subset of the Canadian Rockies in Alberta, Canada.

== Climate ==
Based on the Köppen climate classification, Brachiopod Mountain is located in a subarctic climate zone with cold, snowy winters, and mild summers. Temperatures can drop below −20 °C with wind chill factors below −30 °C.

== See also ==
- List of mountains of Canada
- Geology of Alberta
