= Lake Louise Ski Resort =

Ski resort in Alberta, Canada

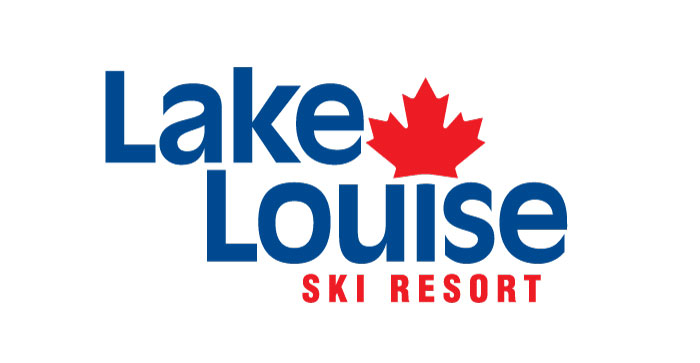

- Lake Louise in 2004

- Location in Canada Location in Alberta
- Location: Lake Louise, Alberta, Canada
- Nearest city: Banff, Alberta; Calgary, Alberta
- Coordinates: 51°26′31″N 116°09′38″W
- Vertical: 991 m (3,250 ft)
- Top elevation: 2,637 m (8,650 ft)
- Base elevation: 1,646 m (5,400 ft)
- Skiable area: 17 km^{2} (6.6 sq mi)
- Trails: 145
- Longest run: 8 km (5 mi)
- Lift system: 10 lifts: 3 surface lifts; 1 fixed-grip triple; 2 fixed-grip quad; 6 high-speed lifts; 1 six-passenger gondola
- Lift capacity: more than 14,000 skiers/hr
- Terrain parks: 4
- Snowfall: 454 cm (180 in) per year
- Website: skilouise.com

The Lake Louise Ski Resort & Summer Gondola is a ski resort in western Canada, located in Banff National Park near the village of Lake Louise, Alberta. Located 57 km (35 mi) west of Banff, Lake Louise is one of three major (Note: With Banff Sunshine and Mt Norquay) ski resorts within Banff National Park, with the other two being Banff Sunshine and Mt. Norquay Ski Resort.

The resort is situated on the southern slopes of the Slate Range, with most of its skiable terrain on the slopes of Whitehorn Mountain, with additional skiable terrain to the east on the lower western slope of Lipalian Mountain. The overall ski area is between the heights of Mount Richardson, Ptarmigan Peak, Pika Peak and Redoubt Mountain, all around 3,000 m (10,000 ft) above sea level. The base of the slopes is defined by Pipestone River, a tributary of the Bow River, immediately north of the intersections between Highway 1A (Bow Valley Trail), Highway 1 (Trans-Canada Highway), and Highway 93 (Icefields Parkway).

== History ==
Lake Louise has been a home to skiing since the 1920s, as the gateway to the Skoki Ski Lodge. The first lift was constructed in 1954, and a poma was added in 1960.

Until autumn 2008, the ski resort was owned and operated by the Resorts of the Canadian Rockies (RCR) company. In 2008, Charlie Locke, a former owner of the ski area (1981–2003), exercised a buy-back option to reacquire Lake Louise from RCR to return as the ski resort's owner, president and operator.

== Events ==
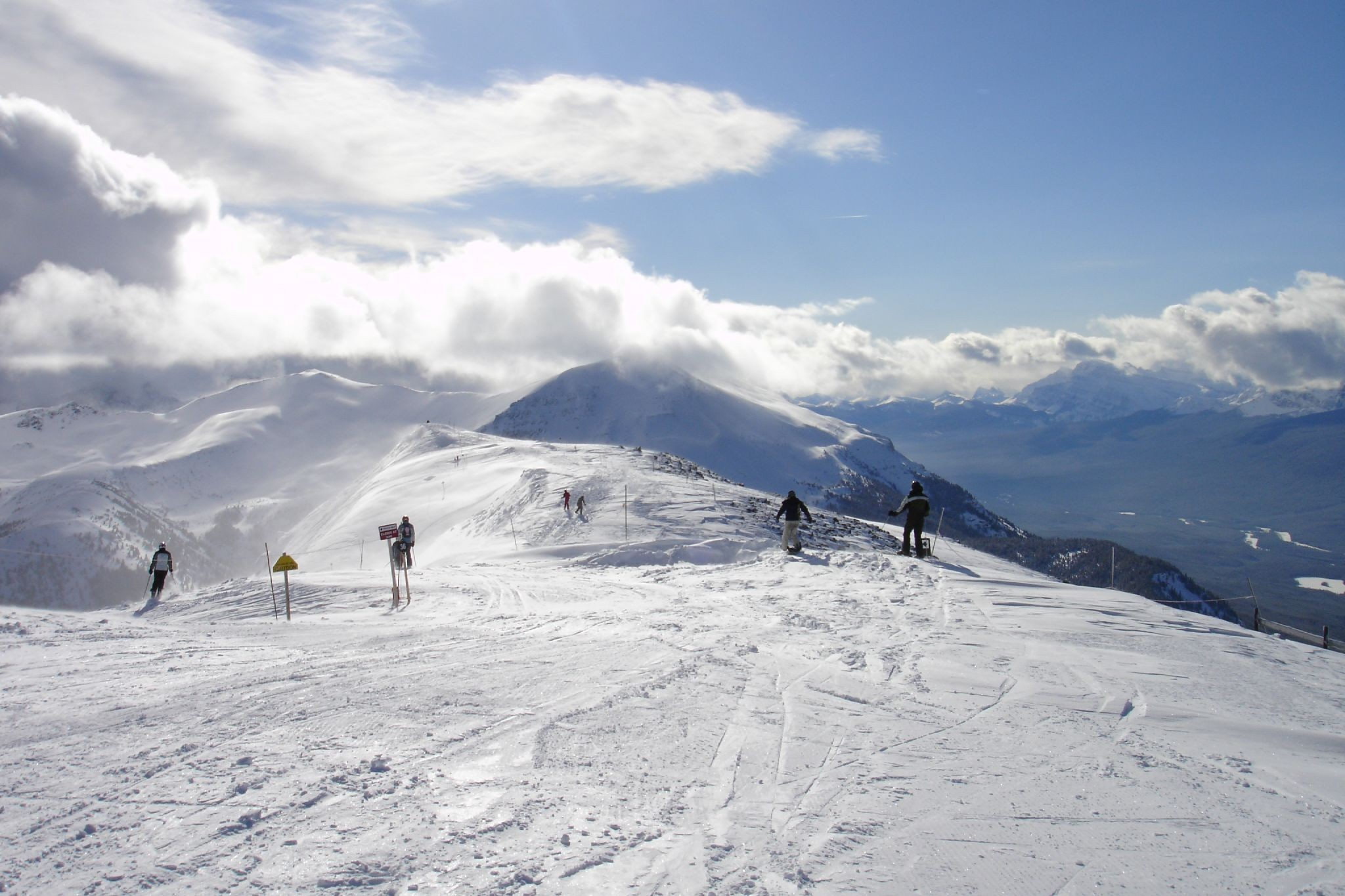
Skiing at Lake Louise.

The Lake Louise Ski Resort is the first stop on the FIS Alpine Ski World Cup circuit, and the only place in Canada where this event is held. The event, also known as the Lake Louise Winterstart World Cup, is described by Alpine Canada as "Canada's highest-profile alpine ski race", and attracts high-profile downhill skiers from around the globe - such as four-time World Cup champion, Lindsey Vonn. The races began at the resort in 1980 and ran consecutively from 1993 to 2020. The 2020 COVID-19 pandemic caused the 2020 races to be cancelled. The race is one of the select few that holds both the men's and ladies' speed events on the World Cup circuit and plays host to the first World Cup downhill and super-G races of the season.

The Lake Louise Ski Resort hosted its first FIS Snowboard Cross World Cup in December 2013.

The resort also hosts Shake The Lake: a freestyle and live music event held at the end of the snow season.

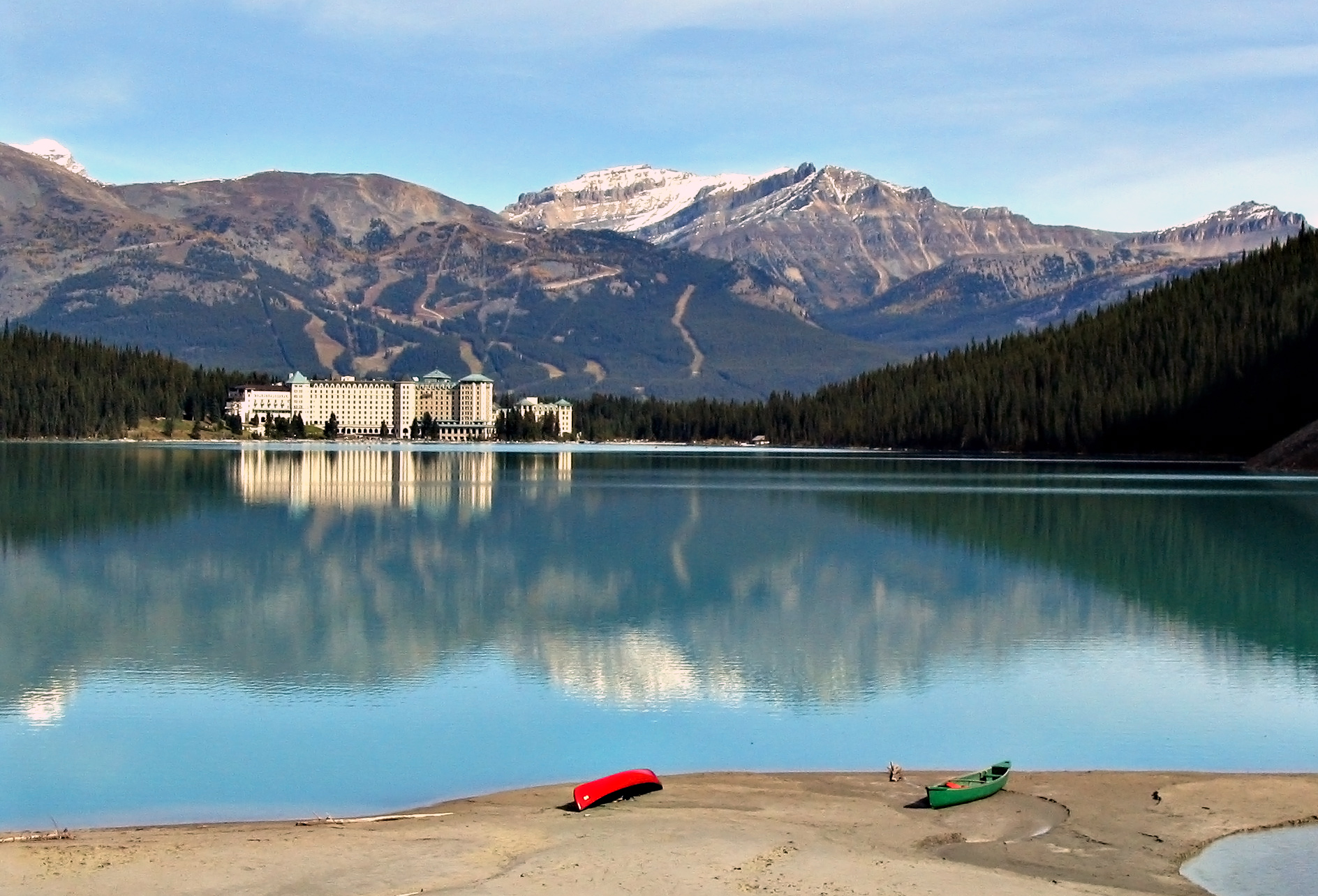
Lake Louise Ski Area on Mt. Whitehorn, seen from Lake Louise.

== Facilities ==
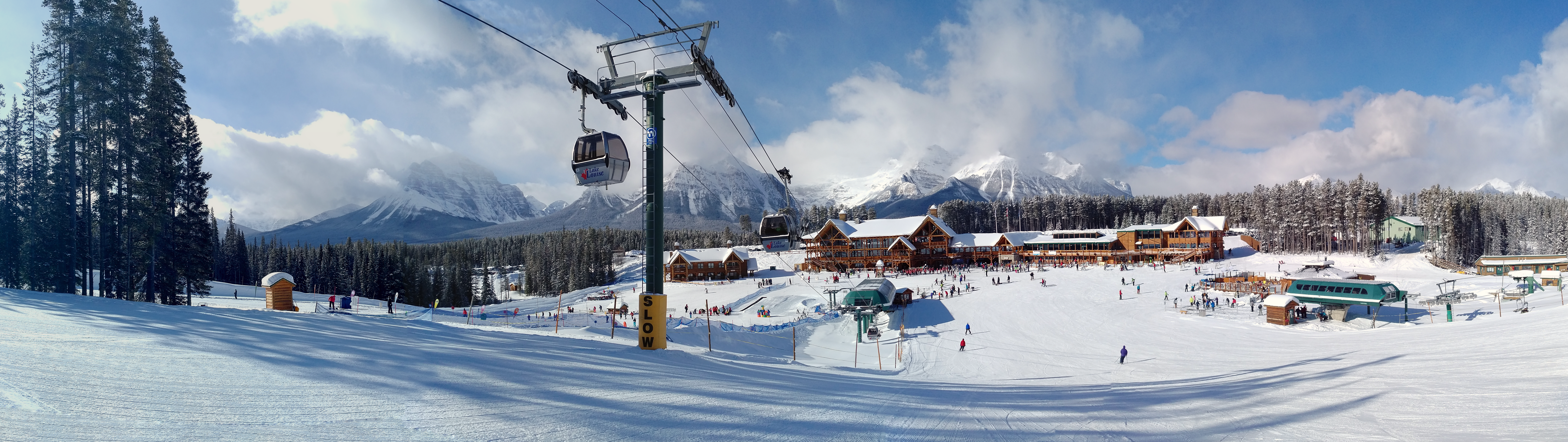
Lake Louise Grizzly Express and Lodges, March 2017.

The 145 marked ski runs and back bowls on four mountain faces are 25% beginner, 45% intermediate and 30% advanced. The 'Terrain Park' is also designed for riders of all levels. Four full service day lodges are operational during winter. Snowboarders have access to all trails and the terrain park.

The Lake Louise sightseeing gondola is open year-round, offering panoramas of glaciers, natural springs, wildflowers and possibly wildlife (such as grizzly bears). Other activities in the resort area include dog sledding, ice skating, and cross-country skiing.

=== Trails ===
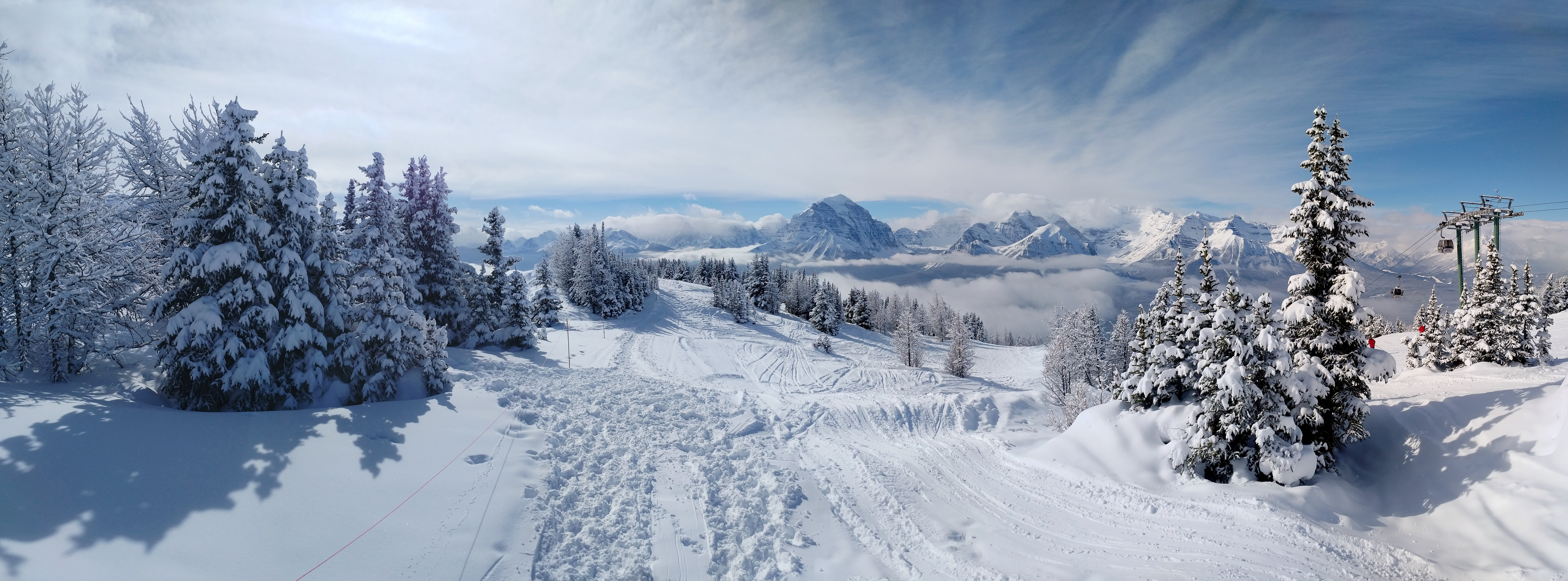
View on the trails and on the mountains, March 2018.

Easier	Intermediate	Advanced	Difficult (Double Black) ♦♦
17	25	54	43

=== Lifts ===
- Lake Louise has 10 lifts, and 3 magic carpets, including:
  - 4 High speed quads (including Richardson's Ridge Express opening spring 2026)
  - 2 High speed six
  - 2 Fixed grip quad
  - 1 Fixed grip triple
  - 1 Gondola (6 passengers)
