= Skoki Valley =

Skoki Valley is a valley in Banff National Park in Alberta, Canada near the Town of Lake Louise. The valley is home to many lakes and passes such as Hidden Lake, Ptarmigan Lake and Deception Pass. The valley is popular among backcountry hikers, skiers and climbers because of its untouched snow and views. To accommodate skiers in the 1930s the Skoki Ski Lodge and Halfway Hut were built out of logs by local outfitters. The Red Deer Lakes which are the headwaters of the Red Deer River are located near the valley at the foot of Skoki Mountain.
