= Ptarmigan Peak (Baranof Island) =

Mountain in Alaska, United States

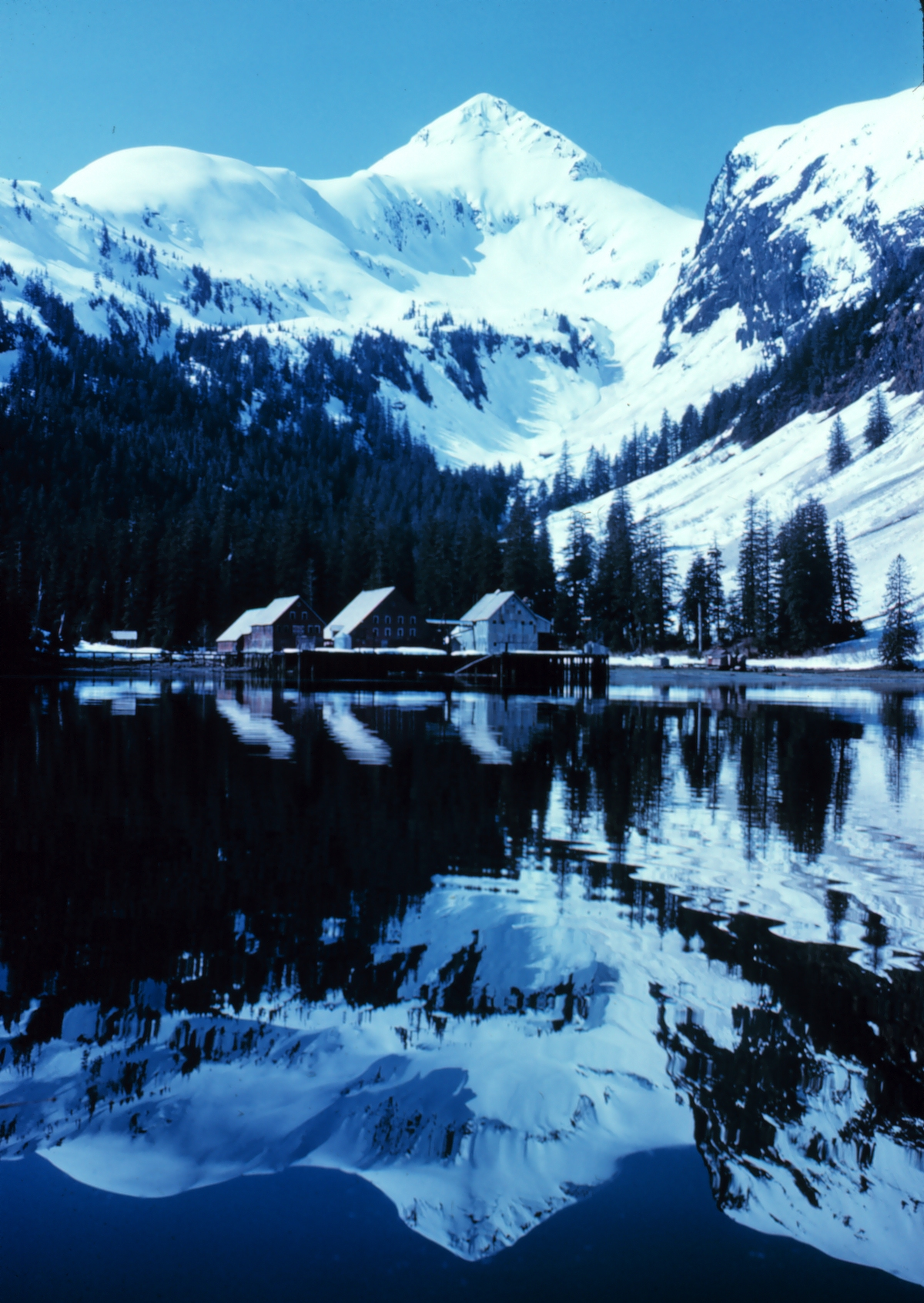
- Northeast aspect, from Big Port Walter

Highest point
- Elevation: 2,972 ft (906 m)
- Prominence: 622 ft (190 m)
- Parent peak: Peak 3250
- Isolation: 0.98 mi (1.58 km)
- Coordinates: 56°22′00″N 134°46′15″W

Naming
- Etymology: Ptarmigan

Geography
- Location within Alaska
- Country: United States
- State: Alaska
- City and Borough: Sitka
- Protected area: Tongass National Forest
- Parent range: Alexander Archipelago
- Topo map: USGS Port Alexander B-3

Ptarmigan Peak is a 2,972-foot-elevation (906-meter) mountain summit in Alaska, United States.

== Description ==
Ptarmigan Peak is located on Baranof Island and 9.4 miles (15.1 km) north-northwest of Port Alexander, Alaska. It is set on land managed by Tongass National Forest. Precipitation runoff from the mountain's east slopes drains to Port Walter, whereas the west slopes drain to Big Branch Bay. Although modest in elevation, topographic relief is significant as the summit rises 2,972 feet (906 m) above tidewater of Big Branch Bay in 1.5 miles (2.4 km) and 1,400 feet (427 m) above an unnamed lake to the north in 0.35 mi (0.56 km). The peak's local name was recorded in 1951 by the U.S. Geological Survey and the toponym has been officially adopted by the United States Board on Geographic Names.

== Climate ==
Based on the Köppen climate classification, Ptarmigan Peak is located in a subpolar oceanic climate zone with long, cold, snowy winters, and cool summers. Weather systems coming off the Gulf of Alaska are forced upwards by the mountains (orographic lift), causing heavy precipitation in the form of rain and snow. Winter temperatures can drop to 10 °F with wind chill factors below 0 °F.

== See also ==
- List of mountain peaks of Alaska
- Geography of Alaska
