= Ptarmigan Tunnel =

- U.S. National Register of Historic Places
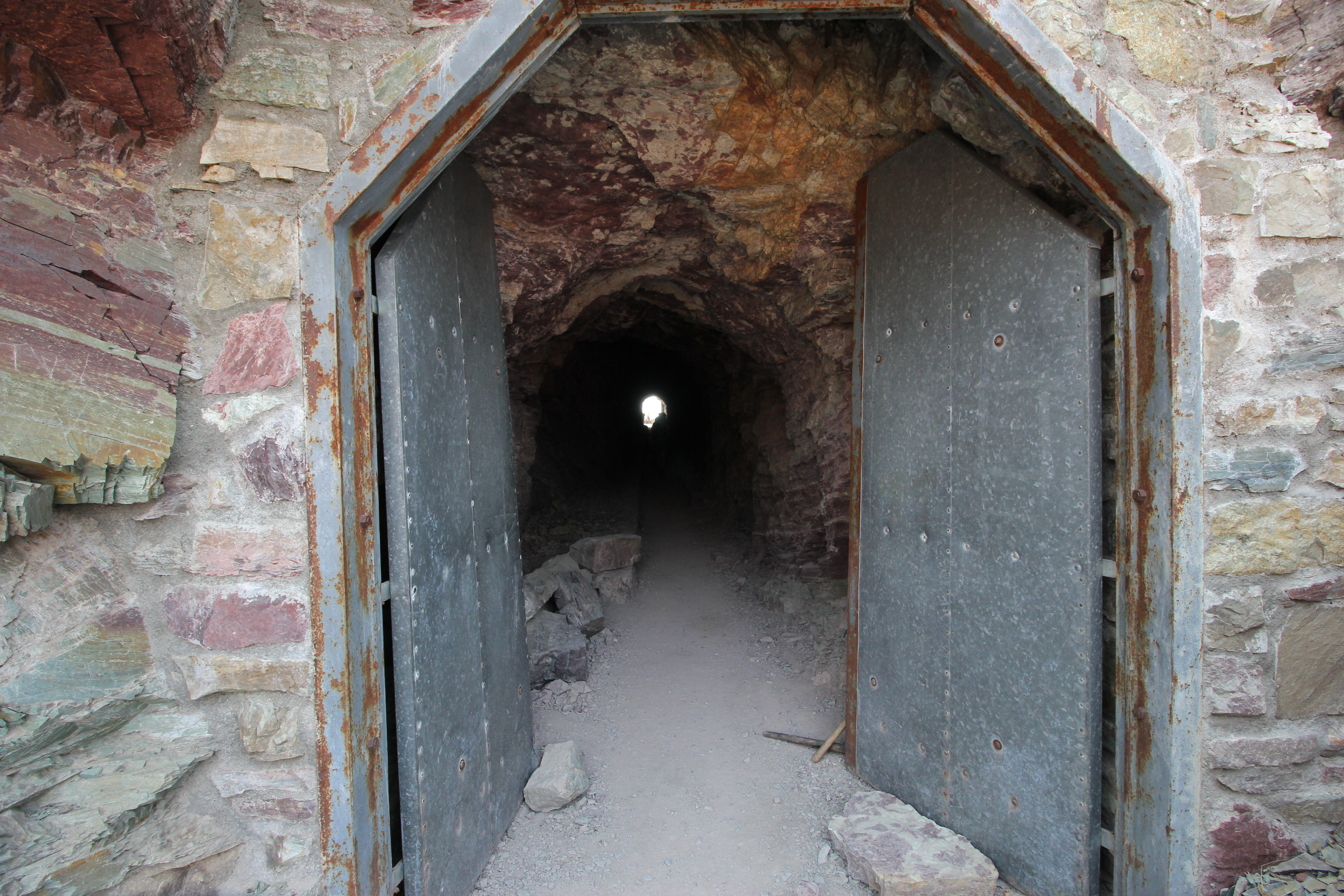

- Location within Montana Location within the United States
- Location: Glacier National Park, Glacier County, Montana, USA
- Nearest city: West Glacier, Montana
- Coordinates: 48°50′57″N 113°42′28″W
- Built: 1930
- Architect: Ole Westman
- MPS: Glacier National Park MRA
- NRHP reference No.: 86000360
- Added to NRHP: February 14, 1986

The Ptarmigan Tunnel was built in 1930 through the Ptarmigan Wall at an elevation of 7,200 feet (2,200 m) in Glacier National Park, near Many Glacier, in Montana, US. The 250-foot (76 m) manmade tunnel allows hikers to avoid a strenuous climb over very steep terrain between Many Glacier and the Belly River valley. Two opposing steel jackhammers drilling from either side of the tunnel and a series of ten-hole rounds of dynamite gradually broke through the mountain in less than three months.

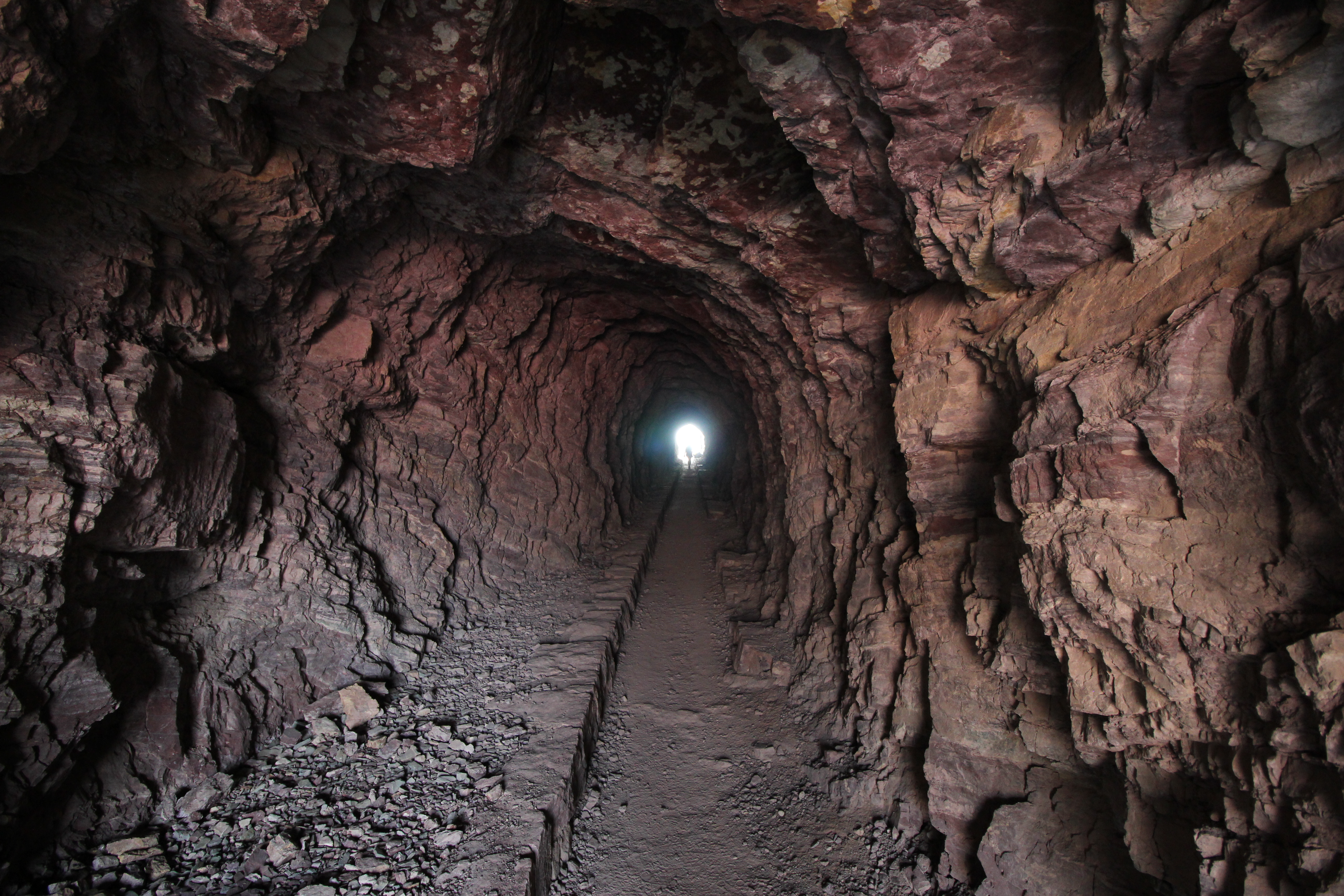
Ptarmigan Tunnel inside

A wide area, originally for guide and tourist horses, extends from each portal with a masonry retaining wall. Natural rock lines the interior walls. Heavy iron doors were hung across the tunnel adits during the summer of 1975. They remain open from mid-July until October 1, weather permitting. Designed by Ole Westman, this trail tunnel embodies exceptional qualities of landscape architecture and engineering in a pedestrian-scaled tunnel, cut through a sheer mountain wall.

== See also ==
- Ptarmigan Lake
- Burro Schmidt Tunnel
