= Slate Range (Alberta) =

Mountain range in Alberta, Canada

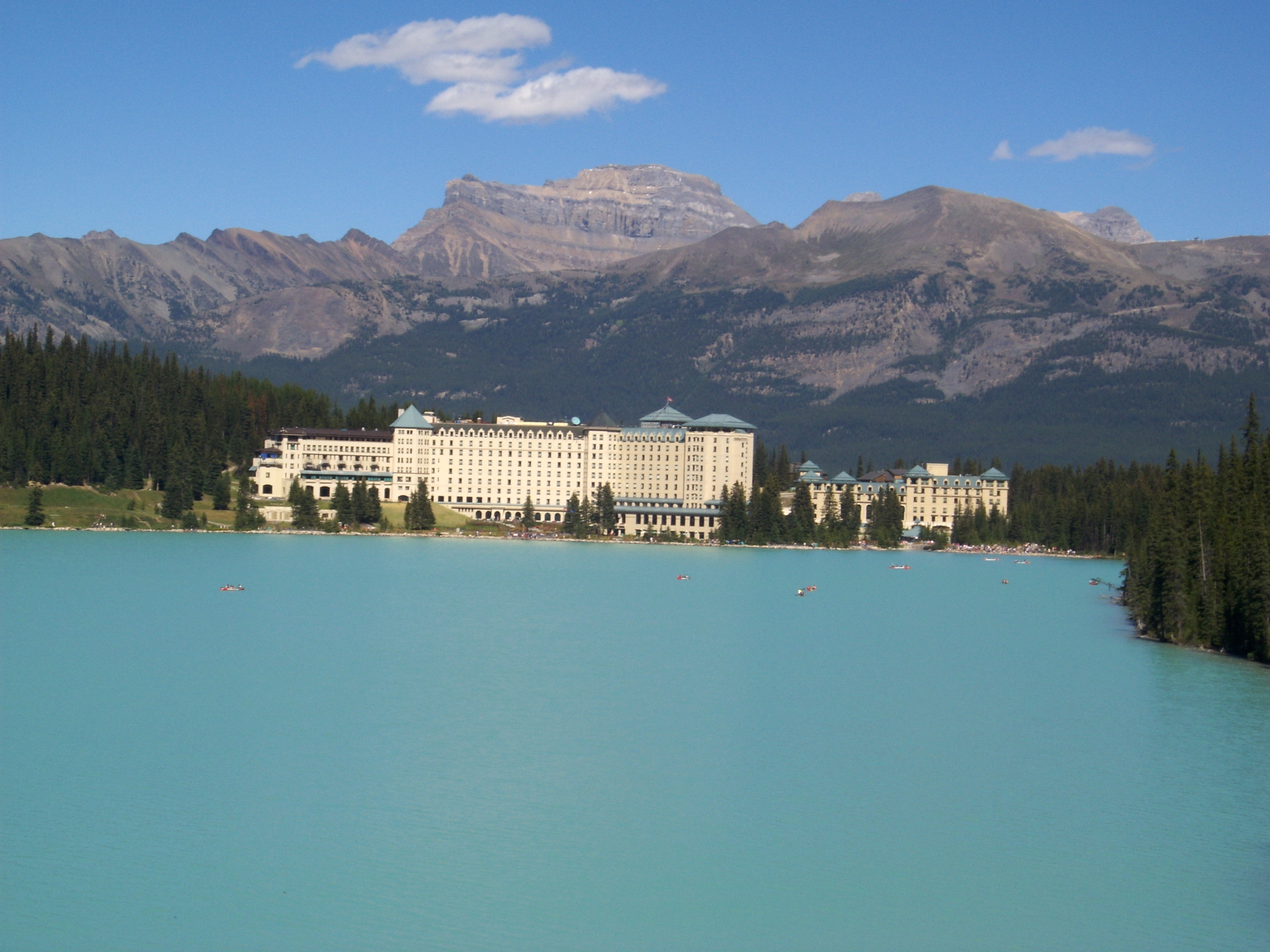
- Mt. Richardson seen from Lake Louise

Highest point
- Peak: Mount Richardson
- Elevation: 3,086 m (10,125 ft)
- Prominence: 922 m (3,025 ft)
- Listing: Mountains of Alberta
- Coordinates: 51°29′45″N 116°07′21″W

Dimensions
- Length: 26 km (16 mi) W-E
- Width: 13 km (8.1 mi) N-S

Geography
- Location within Alberta
- Country: Canada
- Province: Alberta
- Range coordinates: 51°29′46″N 116°07′20″W
- Parent range: Canadian Rockies
- Topo map: NTS 82N8 Lake Louise

The Slate Range is a mountain range of the Canadian Rockies, located in Banff National Park, Canada. The range is named after slate, the primary composition of the mountains in the area.

The Lake Louise Ski Resort is on the southern slopes of this range.

== Peaks ==
This range includes the following mountains and peaks:

Mountain / Peak	Elevation		Prominence		FA	Coordinates
Mountain / Peak	m	ft	m	ft	FA	Coordinates
Mount Richardson	3,086	10,125	922	3,025	1909	51°29′45″N 116°7′21″W
Ptarmigan Peak	3,059	10,036	209	686	1909	51°29′32″N 116°5′26″W
Pika Peak	3,053	10,016	13	43	1909	51°29′47″N 116°6′24″W
Fossil Mountain	2,946	9,665	471	1,545	1906	51°30′11″N 116°2′46″W
Redoubt Mountain	2,902	9,521	570	1,870	1906	51°28′2″N 116°4′52″W
Skoki Mountain	2,707	8,881	482	1,581	Unk	51°31′48″N 116°3′38″W
Anthozoan Mountain	2,695	8,842	304	997	1911	51°27′46″N 116°1′39″W
Lipalian Mountain	2,682	8,799	182	597	Unk	51°25′37″N 116°5′50″W
Brachiopod Mountain	2,667	8,750	152	499	1911	51°28′43″N 116°2′13″W
Heather Ridge	2,636	8,648	213	699	Unk	51°28′21″N 116°3′5″W
Whitehorn Mountain	2,621	8,599	167	548	1884	51°28′4″N 116°8′30″W

== See also ==
- Ranges of the Canadian Rockies
