= Whitehorn Mountain (Alberta) =

Mountain in Alberta, Canada

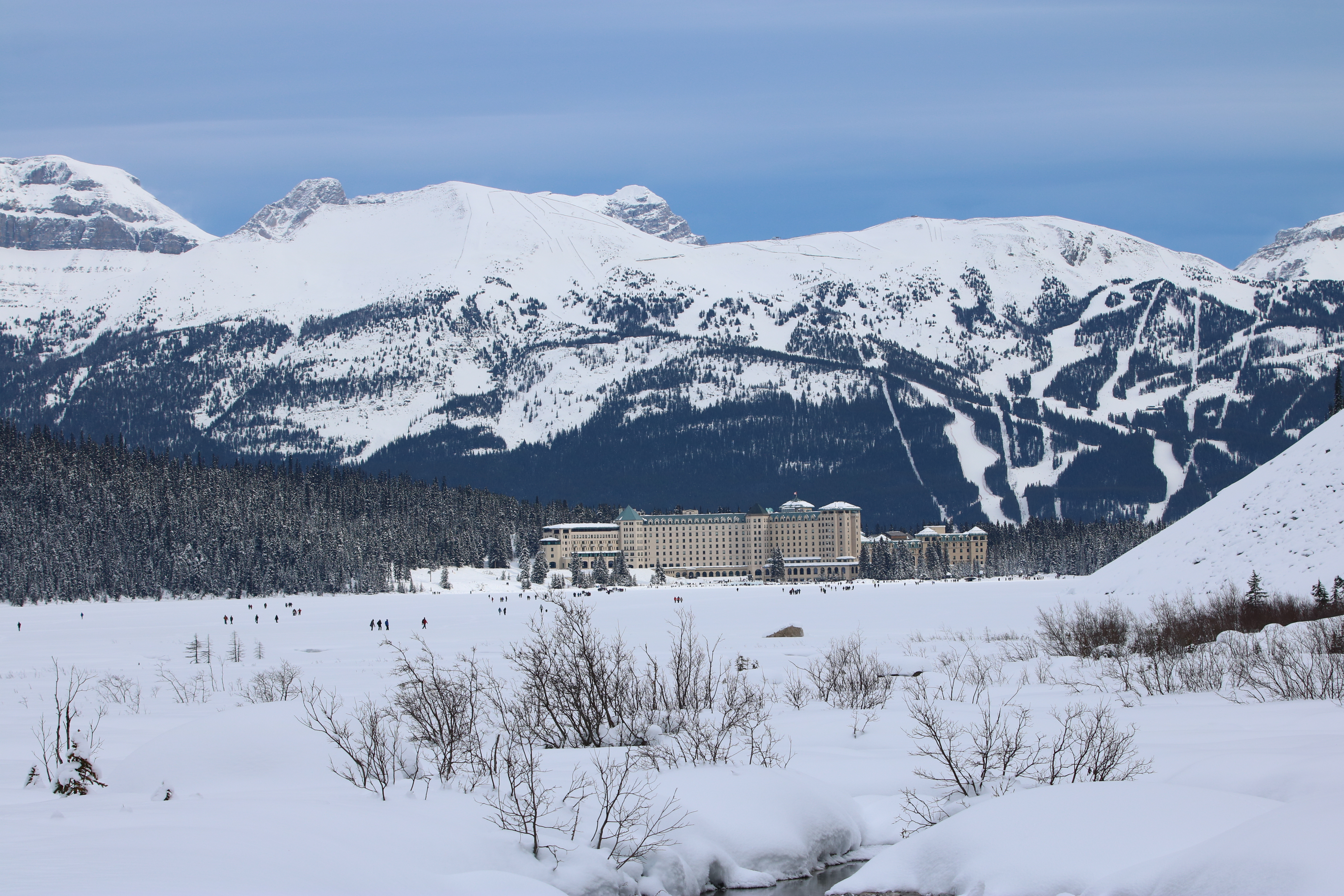
- Whitehorn Mountain (including Lake Louise Ski Resort) is seen beyond Chateau Lake Louise

Highest point
- Elevation: 2,621 m (8,599 ft)
- Prominence: 167 m (548 ft)
- Parent peak: Mount Richardson
- Listing: Mountains of Alberta
- Coordinates: 51°28′04″N 116°08′30″W

Geography
- Location within Alberta Location within Canada
- Country: Canada
- Province: Alberta
- Protected area: Banff National Park
- Parent range: Slate Range; Canadian Rockies
- Topo map: NTS 82N8 Lake Louise

Climbing
- First ascent: 1884 A.P. Coleman

Whitehorn Mountain is located in the Slate Range of Banff National Park in Alberta, Canada. The mountain is home to the Lake Louise Ski Resort.

== Geology ==
Like other mountains in Banff Park, Whitehorn is composed of sedimentary rock laid down from the Precambrian to Jurassic periods. Formed in shallow seas, this sedimentary rock was pushed east and over the top of younger rock during the Laramide orogeny.

== Climate ==
Based on the Köppen climate classification, Whitehorn is located in a subarctic climate zone with cold, snowy winters, and mild summers. Temperatures can drop below -20 °C with wind chill factors below -30 °C.

== See also ==
- List of mountains of Canada
