= Australian Alpine Club =

The Australian Alpine Club was founded in 1950 and is one of the oldest continually existing Alpine clubs in Australia. it was founded in 1950 by Charles Anton. Huts were constructed in the "backcountry" close to Mount Kosciuszko, including Kunama Hut, which opened for the 1953 season. A rope tow was also installed on Mount Northcote at this location, commencing operations in 1954. The site was ideal for speed skiing, but the hut was destroyed by an avalanche in 1956, resulting in one fatality.

== See also ==
- List of alpine clubs
- Winter sport in Australia
