= Ptarmigan Pass (Sawatch Range) =

Mountain pass in Colorado, USA

Coordinates: 39°29′35″N 106°15′12″W

- Interactive map of Ptarmigan Pass
- Elevation: 11,765 ft (3,586 m)
- Traversed by: Unpaved road

Third Approach
- Location: Eagle / Summit counties, Colorado, United States
- Range: Rocky Mountains
- Topo map: USGS topo map

Note: There are at least three separate mountain passes in Colorado named Ptarmigan Pass. This article concerns the one between Eagle County and Summit County.

Ptarmigan Pass (elevation 11,765 ft) is a high mountain pass in the Rocky Mountains of central Colorado in the United States.

It is located on the crest of the northern end of the Sawatch Range, along the border of Eagle and Summit counties, south of Vail Pass. The pass is traversed by a jeep trail that is passable by four-wheel drive vehicles and on foot. 2WD vehicles will only make it to the summit from the west; the east side is rocky and boggy at times. The trail connects Interstate 70 east of Vail Pass with the Eagle River Valley near Red Cliff.
