= Ptarmigan Lake (Glacier County, Montana) =

Lake in Montana, United States

- Location within Montana Location within the United States
- Location: Glacier National Park, Glacier County, Montana, US
- Coordinates: 48°50′40″N 113°42′40″W
- Type: Natural
- Primary outflows: Ptarmigan Creek
- Basin countries: United States
- Max. length: .15 mi (0.24 km)
- Max. width: .08 mi (0.13 km)
- Surface elevation: 6,625 ft (2,019 m)

Ptarmigan Lake is located in Glacier National Park, in the U. S. state of Montana. Ptarmigan Lake is situated below the Ptarmigan Wall. The lake is a 4.3 miles (6.9 km) hike from the Swiftcurrent Auto Camp Historic District by way of the Ptarmigan Trail. After another .9 miles (1.4 km) hike from Ptarmigan Lake, the historic Ptarmigan Tunnel can be seen.

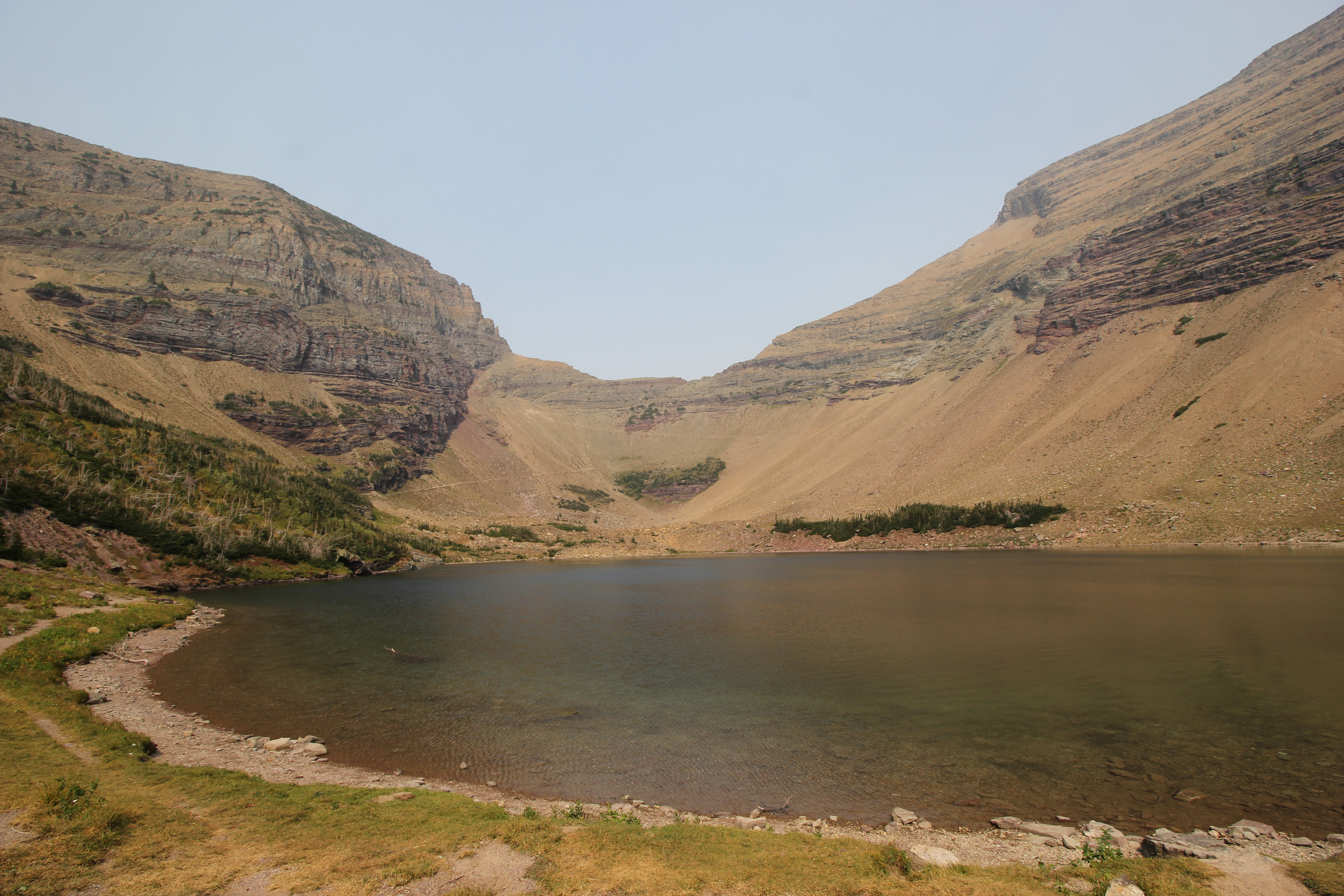
Ptarmigan Lake

== See also ==
- List of lakes in Glacier County, Montana
