= Ptarmigan Peak (Alaska) =

Mountain in Alaska, United States

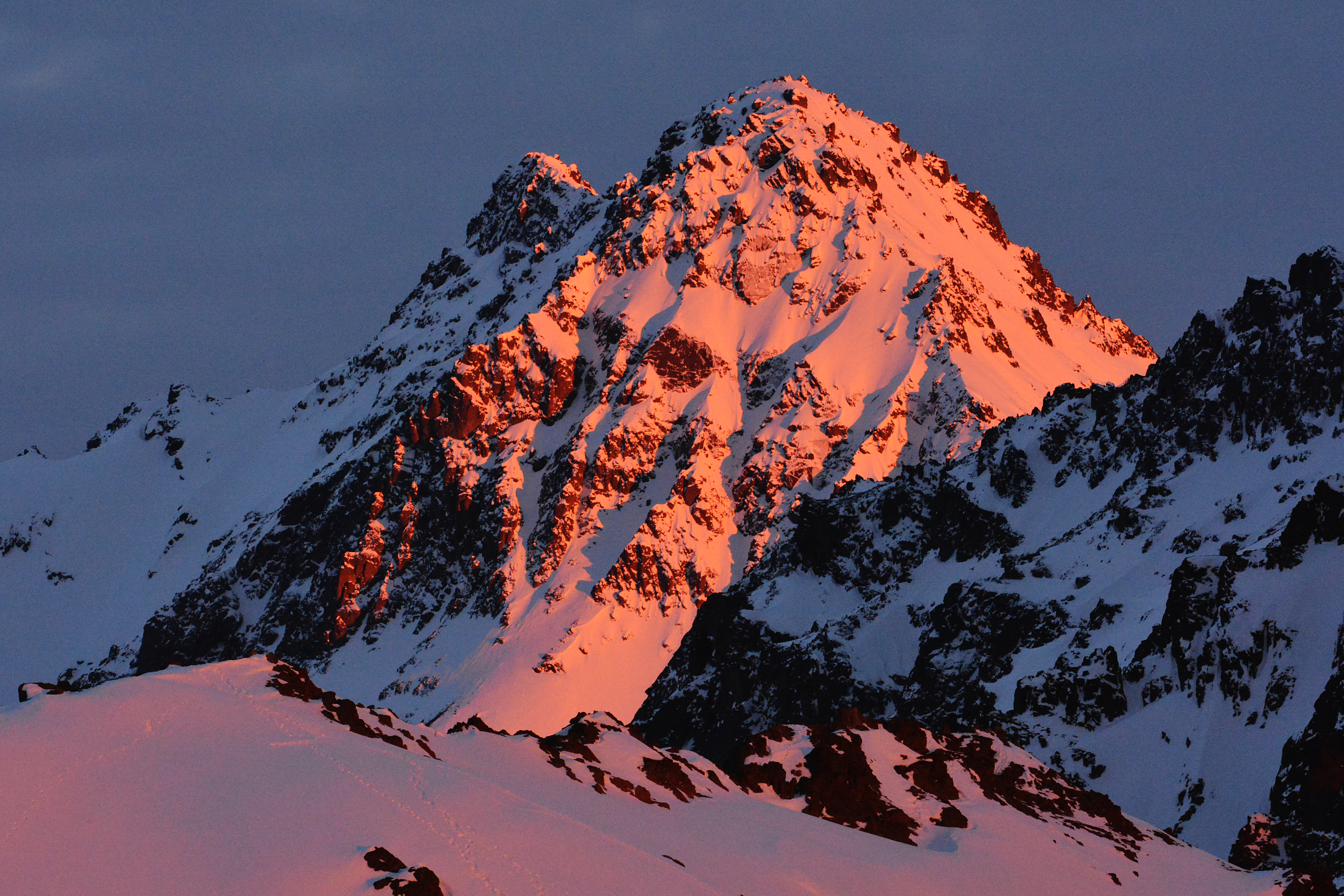

Highest point
- Elevation: 5,053 ft (1,540 m)
- Coordinates: 61°03′35″N 149°36′10″W

Geography
- Location within Alaska
- Location: Chugach State Park, Alaska, United States
- Parent range: Chugach Mountains

Ptarmigan Peak is a 5,053-foot (1,540 m) mountain in the Chugach Mountains near Anchorage, Alaska. Its north face is extremely steep and is sometimes attempted by mountaineers. Hikers generally reach the mountain's summit from the less steep southern side, often via the west ridge that begins at Ptarmigan Pass. In winter, ski mountaineering is also possible on the mountain.

In 1997, 14 members of a mountaineering expedition from the University of Alaska Anchorage (two instructors and twelve students) fell 1,000 feet down the mountain's north face. Two people died, and 11 more were seriously injured.
