= Mount Richardson (Alberta) =

Mountain in Banff NP, Alberta, Canada

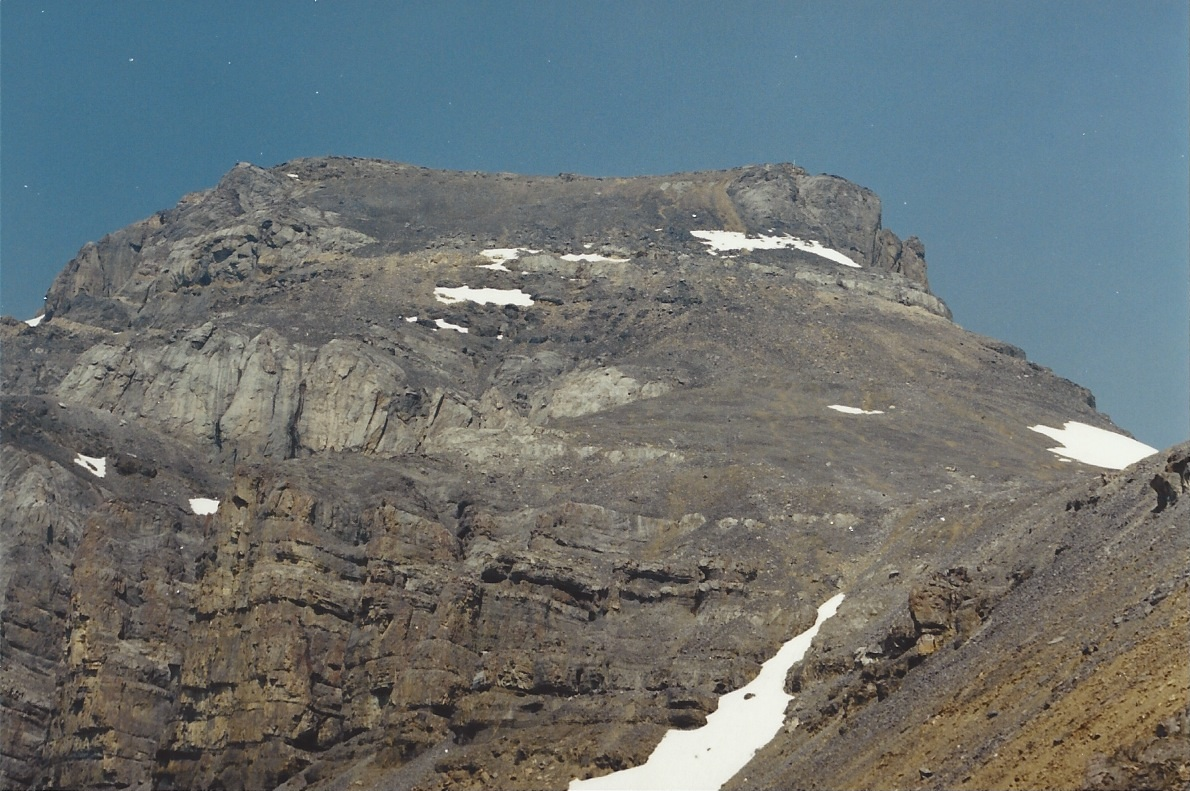
- South slopes of Mt. Richardson, August 1994

Highest point
- Elevation: 3,086 m (10,125 ft)
- Prominence: 922 m (3,025 ft)
- Parent peak: Lychnis Mountain (3124 m)
- Listing: Mountains of Alberta
- Coordinates: 51°29′45″N 116°07′21″W

Geography
- Location within Alberta
- Country: Canada
- Province: Alberta
- Protected area: Banff National Park
- Parent range: Slate Range
- Topo map: NTS 82N8 Lake Louise

Climbing
- First ascent: 1911
- Easiest route: Easy/Moderate Scramble

Mount Richardson is the highest mountain of the Slate Range located beside Pika Peak in Banff National Park, Alberta, Canada. The mountain was named in 1859 by James Hector after Sir John Richardson who was the ship's surgeon and naturalist on John Franklin's 1819 and 1825 expeditions into the Arctic.

The Lake Louise Mountain Resort is developed on the southern slopes of the Merlin Ridge, which includes Mount Richardson, Ptarmigan Peak, Pika Peak. A backcountry campground is located at the foot of the mountain, near Hidden Lake.

The first ascent was made in 1911 by L.L. Delafield who was guided by Edward Feuz jr.

== Routes ==
The scrambling route (rated easy/moderate) begins from Hidden Lake and ascends the southern slopes to the top. The only real challenge on the ascent are a few rubbly gullies just above the lake. A traverse to Pika Peak can be made via the Richardson-Pika col and the west ridge, however this undertaking is much more difficult.

== Gallery ==
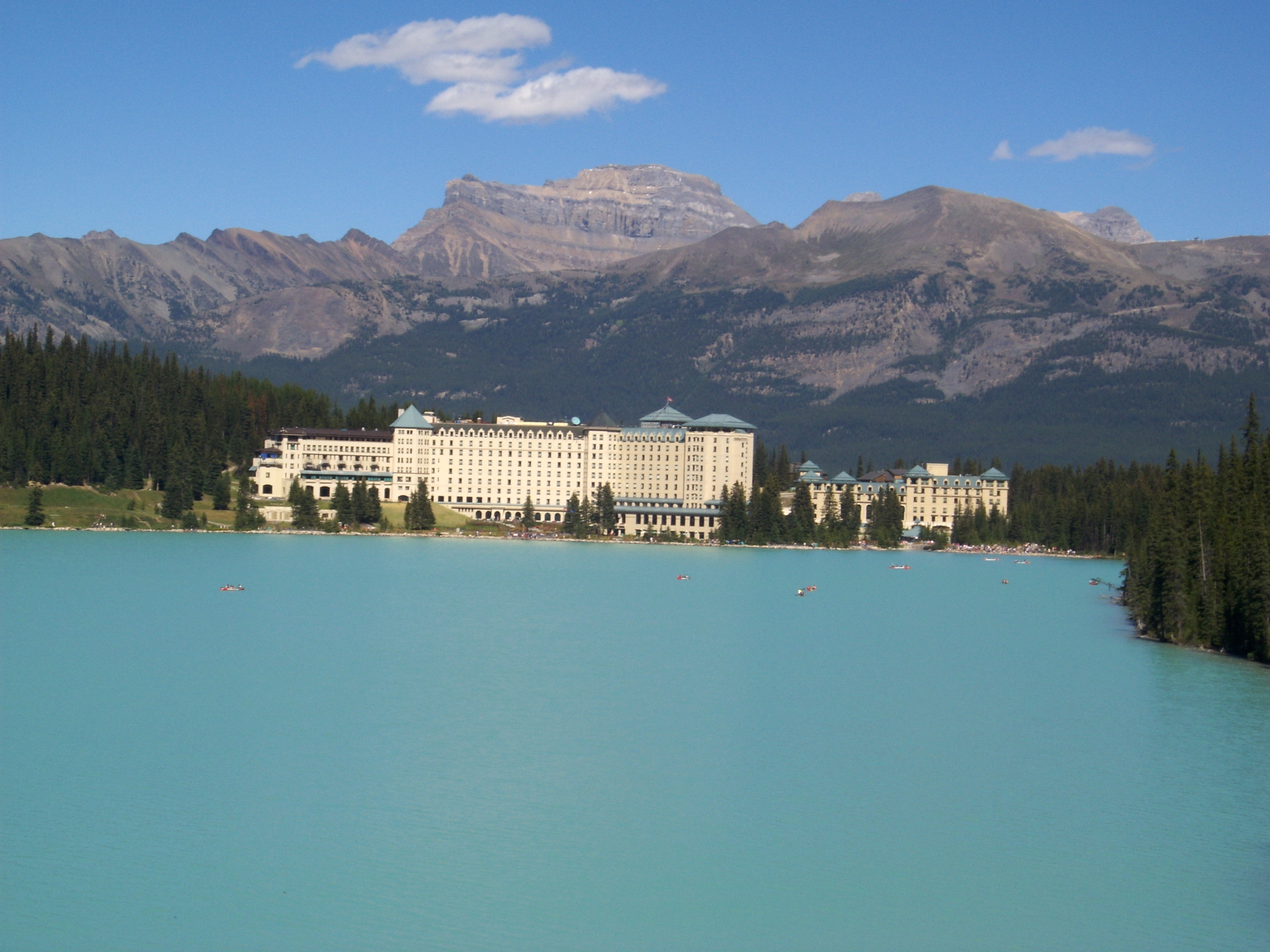
Mount Richardson seen from Lake Louise
