= Ptarmigan Peak (Alberta) =

Mountain in Alberta, Canada

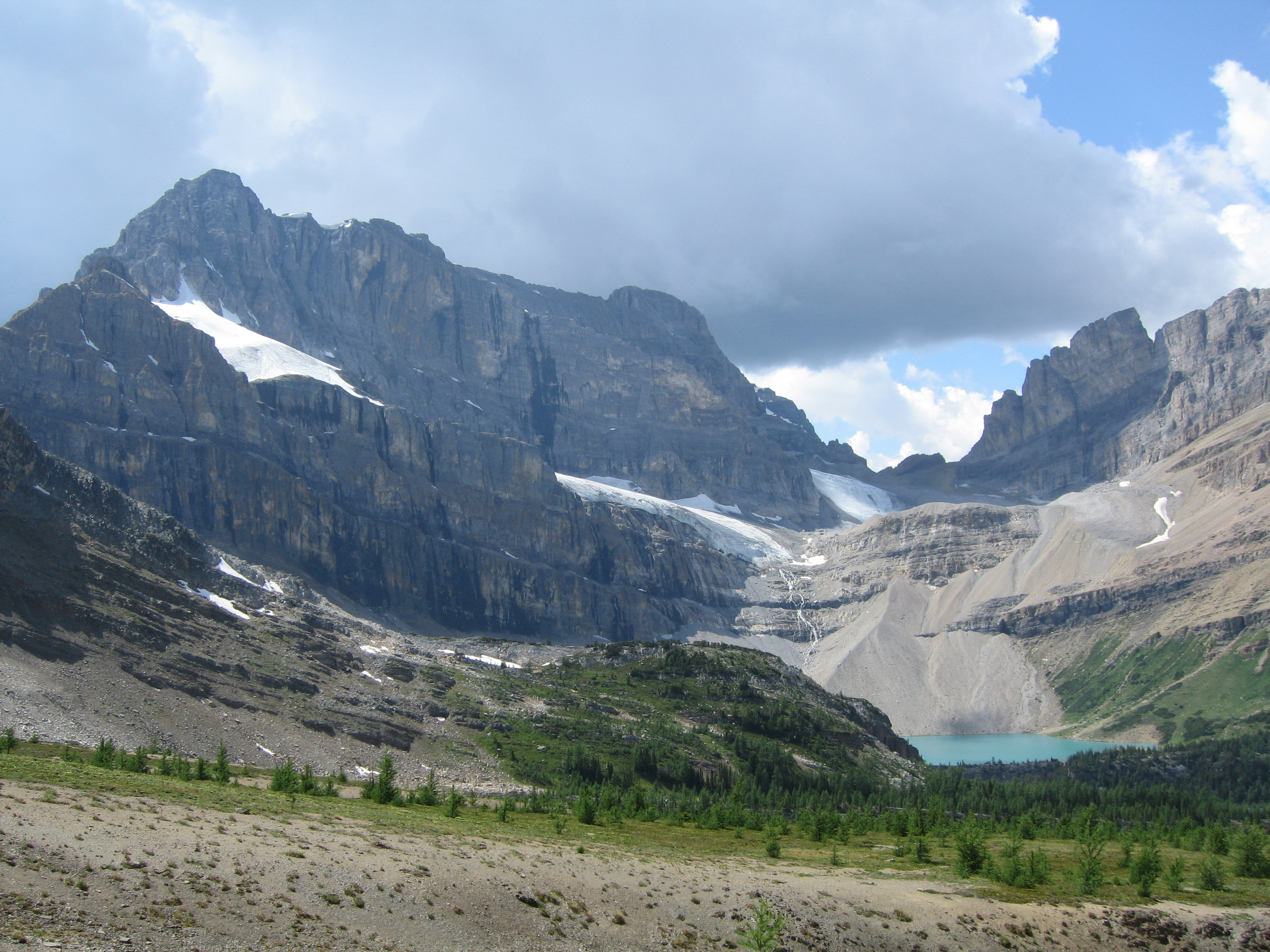
- Ptarmigan Peak (left) seen from Deception Pass

Highest point
- Elevation: 3,059 m (10,036 ft)
- Prominence: 209 m (686 ft)
- Listing: Mountains of Alberta
- Coordinates: 51°29′32″N 116°05′26″W

Geography
- Location within Alberta Location within Canada
- Interactive map of Ptarmigan Peak
- Location: Alberta, Canada
- Parent range: Slate Range; Canadian Rockies
- Topo map: NTS 82N8 Lake Louise

Climbing
- First ascent: 1909
- Easiest route: Moderate scramble

Ptarmigan Peak is a mountain located near Pika Peak in Banff National Park, Alberta, Canada.

The mountain was named in 1909 by J.W.A. Hickson, who named it after encountering several rock ptarmigan in the meadows below the peak. Hickson, guided by Edward Feuz Jr., also completed the first ascent of the peak that same year.

The southern slopes of Merlin Ridge, which includes Ptarmigan Peak, Mount Richardson, and Pika Peak, are home to the Lake Louise Mountain Resort. A backcountry campground is located at the base of the mountain, near Hidden Lake.

== Routes ==
The scrambling route to the summit of Ptarmigan Peak follows the southern slopes and begins from Hidden Lake.

== Geology ==
Like other mountains in Banff National Park, Ptarmigan Peak is composed of sedimentary rock that was laid down from the Precambrian to Jurassic periods. This rock, originally formed in shallow seas, was later uplifted and pushed eastward over younger rock layers during the Laramide orogeny.

== Climate ==
Based on the Köppen climate classification, Ptarmigan Peak is located in a subarctic climate zone, characterized by cold, snowy winters and mild summers. During winter, temperatures can drop below −20 °C, with wind chill factors reaching below −30 °C.

== Gallery ==
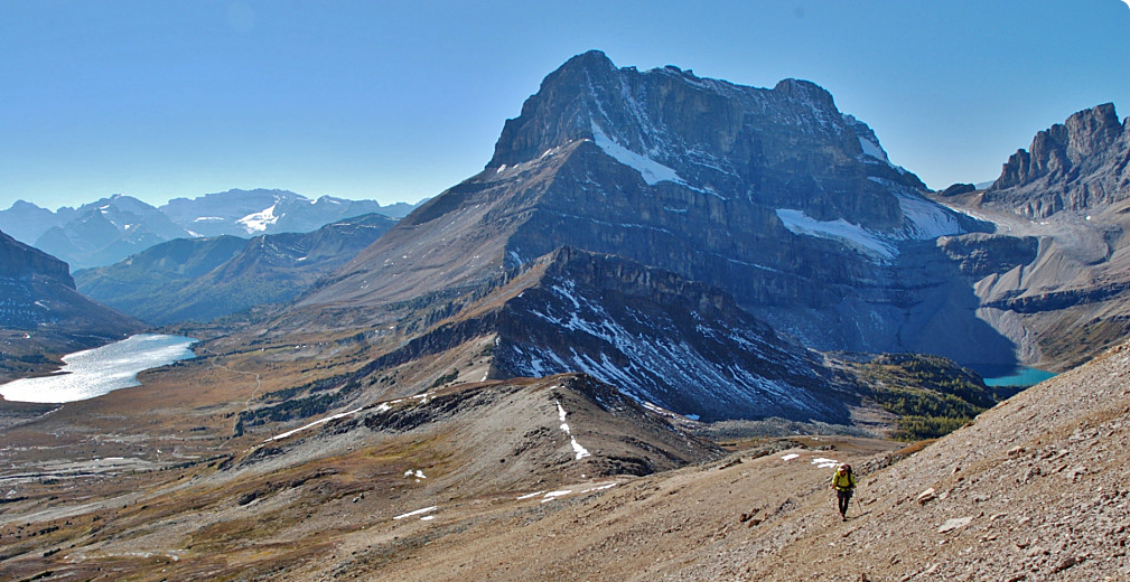
Ptarmigan Peak and Ptarmigan Lake

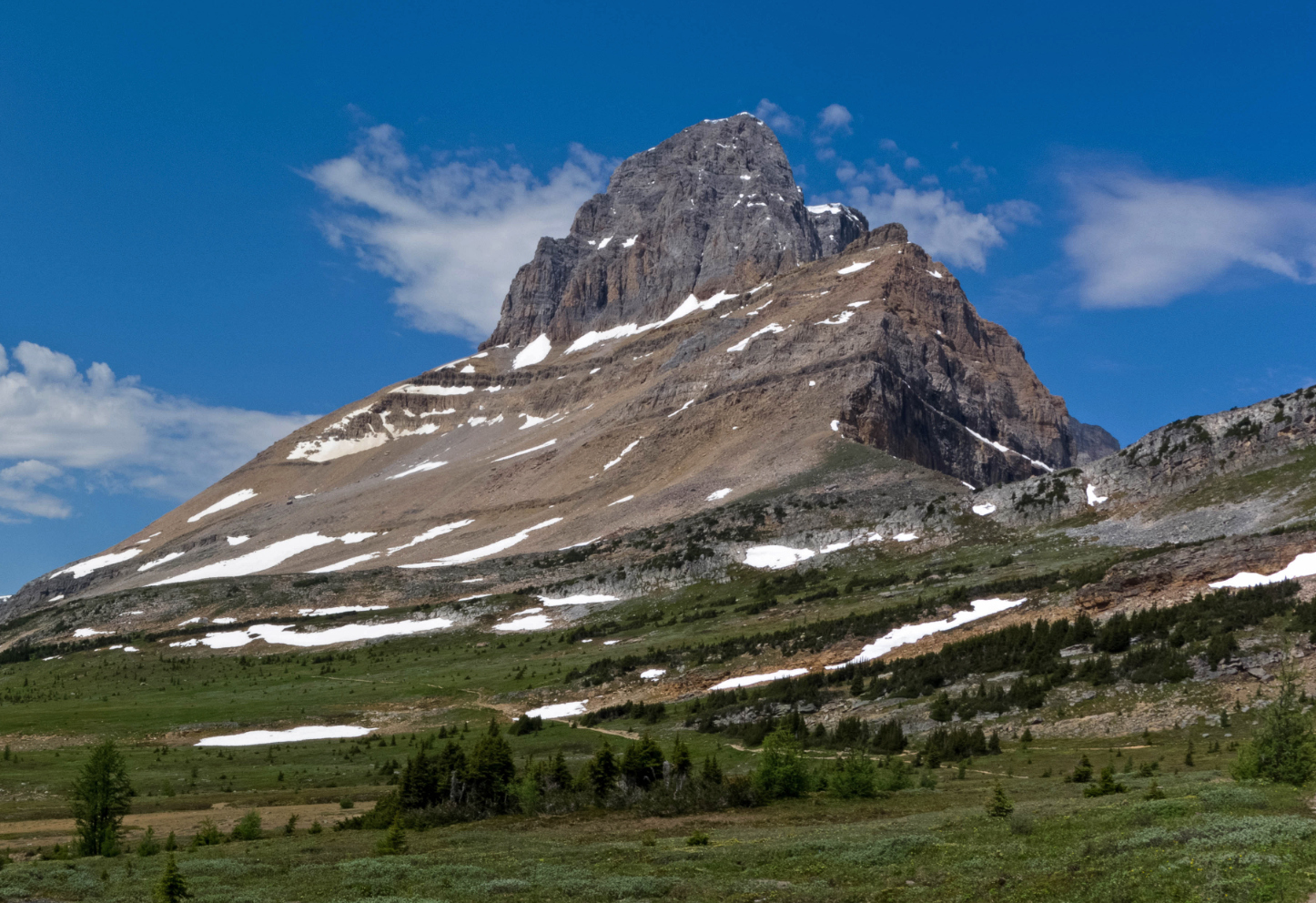
Ptarmigan Peak

== See also ==
- Geography of Alberta
