= Skoki Ski Lodge =

Building in Alberta, Canada

Coordinates: 51.5222°N 116.0750°W

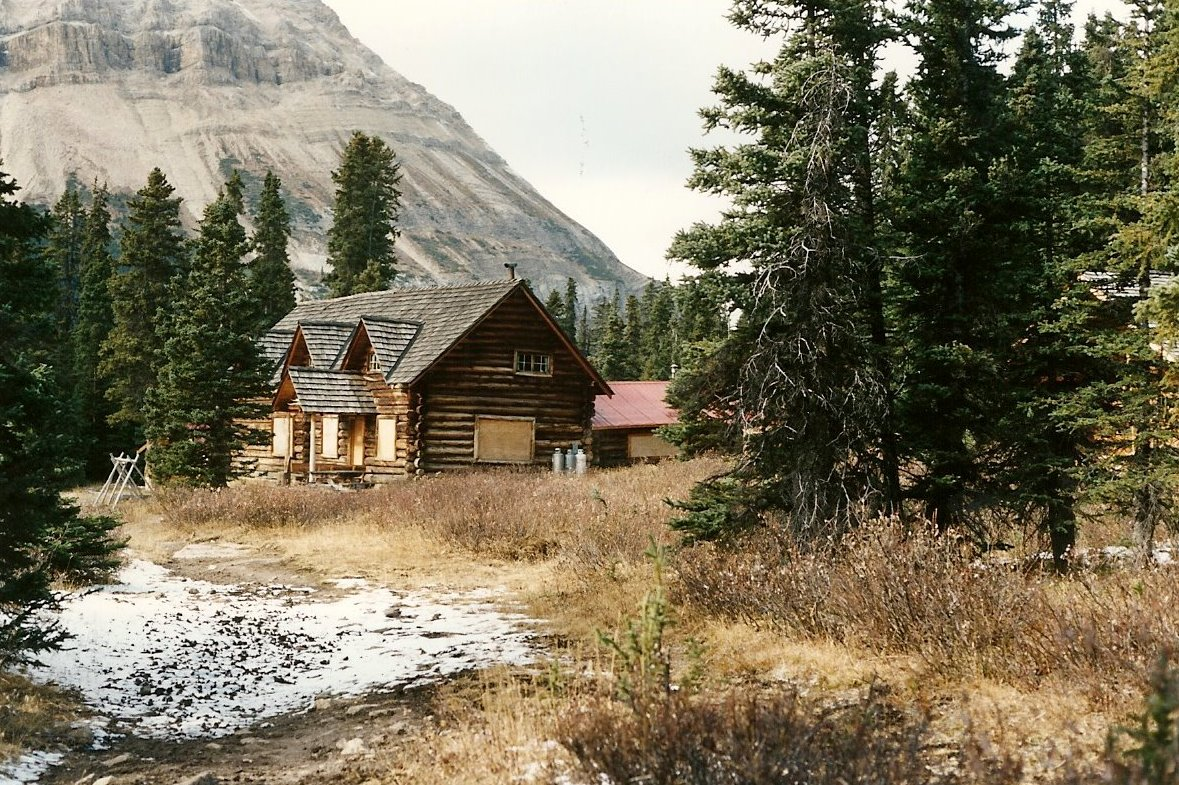
- Interactive map of Skoki Ski Lodge
- Location: Alberta, Canada

History
- Founder: Ski Club of the Canadian Rockies
- Built: 1931

Site notes
- Elevation: 7,100 feet (2,200 m)
- Architect: Earl Spencer
- Architectural style: Rustic Design Tradition
- Governing body: Parks Canada
- Website: Parks Canada page

National Historic Site of Canada
- Designated: 1992

The Skoki Ski Lodge National Historic Site of Canada was built in 1930–31 in the Skoki Valley of Canada's Banff National Park. Built by local members of the Ski Club of the Canadian Rockies, the lodge was the first commercial building built specifically to serve skiers in Canada, and possibly in North America. Design and construction work was carried out by the local outfitter and builder Earl Spencer with help from Spud White and Victor Kutschera. The lodge was progressively expanded through 1936 by the outfitter, guide and log-home builder Jim Boyce, who was also managing the Lodge at the time. It has remained unaltered since then. The Lodge operates throughout the year.

The first non-native to explore the Skoki Valley was James Foster Porter of Illinois in 1911. Porter and his companions suggested many names for the beautiful place, including the "Skokie Valley" which was later revised to Skoki. Skoki, the new spelling, is a Native word for "swamp" which does not actually reflect the valley. Porter was so impressed with the name that a suburb in Chicago near his home was later renamed Skokie.

The Skoki Ski Lodge is 6.8 miles (10.9 km) from the nearest road. The lodge was conceived by Clifford Whyte and Cyril Paris. The first version of the lodge was a single-storey log building, 25 feet (7.6 m) by 16 feet (4.9 m). A resting shelter, the Halfway Hut, was built the following year halfway between Skoki and the Lake Louise railway station. A kitchen and two cabins were also built that year. Management was taken over by Clifford Whyte's younger brother Peter and his wife Catharine, for whom the Whyte Museum of the Canadian Rockies is named. After the 1932 season, when a guest was killed in an avalanche, Jim Boyce took over management and continued to operate the camp through the 1930s. A major expansion took place in 1935–36. The upper-storey rooms were added at this time, as well as a bathhouse and more cabins. In 1972 the lease passed from the Ski Club to Locke's Resorts of the Canadian Rockies. The camp was designated a National Historic Site of Canada in 1992 for its contribution to early tourism in the national parks and as an example of the rustic design style.

During the 2011 royal tour of Canada, the Duke and Duchess of Cambridge stayed at the lodge.
