= List of Rocky Mountain passes on the continental divide =

This is a list of Rocky Mountain passes on the Continental Divide of the Americas.

== Major Passes ==
Note Column:A=Automobile road R=Railway E=Used by early explorers *=not strictly a mountain pass on continental divide, included for reference.

Location	Note	Name	Height	Description
	CANADA			
	Yukon and British Columbia			
67°??'N	*E	Unnamed portage		From the Mackenzie river to the Yukon River. See Canadian canoe routes#Pacific coast
60°04′25″N 130°56′30″W	*A	Alaska Highway		The Alaska Highway crossing of the Continental Divide in south central Yukon, also known as Yukon Hwy 1. Bering Sea or Arctic Ocean drainage.
58°26′00″N 130°01′27″W	*A	Dease Lake, British Columbia		The town is sited on and straddles a gap that is the continental divide and the Stewart-Cassiar Highway (also known as BC Hwy 37) passes through the town as well, thus also crossing the divide at that point. Pacific or Arctic Ocean drainage.
54°15'N	*A	Summit Lake, British Columbia	710m	on British Columbia Highway 97 from Dawson Creek See Pine Pass(?). Pacific or Arctic Ocean drainage.
54°1?'N	*E			low point used by Alexander Mackenzie in 1793
53°58′00″N 120°13′00″W		McGregor Pass	1555	Pacific or Arctic Ocean drainage.
	Alberta/British Columbia border.			
53°10′02″N 119°07′34″W		Robson Pass	1,652 m (5,420 ft)	near Mount Robson. Pacific or Arctic Ocean drainage.
52°53′33″N 118°27′50″W	AR	Yellowhead Pass	1,131 m (3,711 ft)	near Jasper, Alberta. Canadian Northern Railway (1910), north branch of the Trans-Canada Highway. Pacific or Arctic Ocean drainage.
52°22′35″N 118°11′00″W	E	Athabasca Pass	1,753 m (5,751 ft)	Main fur-trade pass from 1811. Used by the York Factory Express. Pacific or Arctic Ocean drainage.
51°48′N 116°45′W	E	Howse Pass	1,539 m (5,049 ft)	First post-Mackenzie pass (1807). rarely used. Pacific Ocean or Hudson Bay drainage.
51°27′10″N 116°17′00″W	AR	Kicking Horse Pass	1,627 m (5,338 ft)	Near Lake Louise, Alberta. Canadian Pacific Railway (1880s), south branch of the Trans-Canada Highway. Pacific Ocean or Hudson Bay drainage.
51°13′39″N 116°02′59″W	A	Vermilion Pass	1,680 m (5,512 ft)	Near Banff, Alberta, Highway 93 south to Radium Hot Springs, British Columbia. Pacific Ocean or Hudson Bay drainage.
51°04′51″N 115°49′47″W	E	Simpson Pass	2,107 m (6,913 ft)	rarely used, southwest of Banff, found by Sir George Simpson in 1841. Pacific Ocean or Hudson Bay drainage.
49°37′57″N 114°41′33″W	AR	Crowsnest Pass	1,358 m (4,455 ft)	only road pass between Banff and US border. Canadian Pacific Railway (1898). Pacific Ocean or Hudson Bay drainage.
49°00'N*	UNITED STATES			
	Montana			
48°41′47.72″N 113°43′5.91″W	A	Logan Pass	6,646 ft (2,026 m)	Going-to-the-Sun Road in Glacier National Park. Divides Pacific Ocean and Hudson Bay drainages.
48.318321°N 113.355255°W	AR	Marias Pass	5,213 ft (1,589 m)	Great Northern Railroad 1889 (now used by BNSF Railway), US Highway 2. Divides Pacific and Atlantic Ocean drainages.
47.142701°N 112.428915°W	E	Lewis and Clark Pass	6,424 ft (1,958 m)	Possibly used on Meriwether Lewis's return route, foot trail and unimproved road. Divides Pacific and Atlantic Ocean drainages.
47°04′35″N 112°22′11″W	A	Rogers Pass	5,610 ft (1,710 m)	Montana Highway 200. Divides Pacific and Atlantic Ocean drainages.
46.9753°N 112.3583°W	A	Flesher Pass		Montana Secondary Highway 279. Divides Pacific and Atlantic Ocean drainages.
46.8936°N 112.4956°W	A	Stemple Pass		Unimproved road. Divides Pacific and Atlantic Ocean drainages.
46.6434°N 112.3138°W	AER	Mullan Pass	5,902 ft (1,799 m)	Mullan Road, Northern Pacific Railroad (now used by Montana Rail Link), unimproved road. Divides Pacific and Atlantic Ocean drainages.
46.6194°N 112.2986°W	A	Priest Pass		Unimproved road. Divides Pacific and Atlantic Ocean drainages.
46.5614°N 112.3086°W	A	MacDonald Pass	6,312 ft (1,924 m)	US Highway 12. Divides Pacific and Atlantic Ocean drainages.
45.0364°N 112.4592°W	AR	Elk Park Pass	6,352 ft (1,936 m)	Great Northern Railroad (abandoned), Interstate 15. Divides Pacific and Atlantic Ocean drainages.
45.9221°N 112.4161°W	AR	Homestake Pass	6,329 ft (1,929 m)	Northern Pacific Railroad (now used by BNSF Railway, inactive), Interstate 90. Divides Pacific and Atlantic Ocean drainages.
45.8597°N 112.4334°W	AR	Pipestone Pass	6,453 ft (1,967 m)	Chicago, Milwaukee, St. Paul and Pacific Railroad (abandoned), Montana Highway 2. Divides Pacific and Atlantic Ocean drainages.
45.8828°N 112.6725°W	AR	Deer Lodge Pass	5,879 ft (1,792 m)	Utah and Northern Railway (now used by Union Pacific), Interstate 15. Divides Pacific and Atlantic Ocean drainages.
45.7469°N 112.9000°W	AE	Gibbons Pass	2,117 m (6,946 ft)	Nez Perce National Historic Trail, possibly used on William Clark's return route, unimproved road. Divides Pacific and Atlantic Ocean drainages.
	Along Montana / Idaho border			
45°41.0′N 113°56.0′W	A	Chief Joseph Pass	7,251 ft (2,210 m)	Montana Highway 43. Divides Pacific and Atlantic Ocean drainages.
45.5497°N 113.8203°W	A	Big Hole Pass	7,055 ft (2,150 m)	Unimproved road. Divides Pacific and Atlantic Ocean drainages.
44°58′27″N 113°26′42″W	AE	Lemhi Pass	7,373 ft (2,247 m)	Lewis and Clark Expedition outbound crossing of Continental Divide, unimproved road. Divides Pacific and Atlantic Ocean drainages.
44.8144°N 113.2719°W	AR	Bannock Pass	7,684 ft (2,342 m)	Gilmore and Pittsburgh Railroad (abandoned), Idaho Highway 29. Divides Pacific and Atlantic Ocean drainages.
44.55861°N 112.30556°W	AR	Monida Pass	6,820 ft (2,079 m)	Utah and Northern Railway (now used by Union Pacific), Interstate 15. Divides Pacific and Atlantic Ocean drainages.
44.5989°N 111.5236°W	A	Red Rock Pass		Unimproved road. Divides Pacific and Atlantic Ocean drainages.
44°42.6′N 111°28.2′W	AE	Raynolds Pass	6,844 ft (2,086 m	Raynolds Expedition, Montana Highway 87. Divides Pacific and Atlantic Ocean drainages.
44.6747°N 112.2758°E	A	Targhee Pass	7,072 ft (2156 m)	US Highway 20. Divides Pacific and Atlantic Ocean drainages.
	Montana / Idaho / Wyoming border			
44°26′30″N 110°43′11″W	A	Craig Pass	8,262 ft (2,518 m	U.S. Route 191, in Yellowstone National Park. Pacific or Gulf of Mexico drainage.
44°2′28″N 110°10′3″W		Two Ocean Pass	8,130 ft (2,478 m)	In the Teton Wilderness. Notable for the Parting of the Waters.Pacific or Gulf of Mexico drainage.
43°45′0″N 110°4′48″W	A	Togwotee Pass	9,658 ft (2,944 m)	U.S. Route 287 and U.S. Route 26. Pacific or Gulf of Mexico drainage.
42°22′12″N 108°54′49″W	*	South Pass	7,412 ft (2,259 m)	Part of a mountain-free area in southwest Wyoming. Oregon Trail and Interstate 80. Pacific or Gulf of Mexico drainage.
41°00'N	Colorado north border			
40°23′5″N 106°36′42″W	A	Rabbit Ears Pass	9,426 ft (2,873 m)	U.S. Route 40. Pacific or Gulf of Mexico drainage.
40°22′36″N 106°34′47″W	A	Muddy Pass	8,772 ft (2,674 m)	U.S. Route 40. Pacific or Gulf of Mexico drainage.
40°21′02″N 106°05′32″W	A	Willow Creek Pass	9,659 ft (2,844 m)	Colorado State Highway 125. Pacific or Gulf of Mexico drainage.
40°25′11″N 105°48′41″W	A	Milner Pass	10,759 ft (3,279 m)	U.S. Route 34 in Rocky Mountain National Park. Pacific or Gulf of Mexico drainage.
40°28′36″N 105°49′24″W		La Poudre Pass	10,184 ft (3,104 m)	Pacific or Gulf of Mexico drainage.
39.90235°N 105.6461°W	*R	Moffat Tunnel	9,239 ft (2,816 m)	Railway tunnel finished in 1928. Avoids Rollins Pass 11,677 ft (3,559 m)Pacific or Gulf of Mexico drainage.
39°40′44″N 105°55′12″W	*A	Eisenhower Tunnel	11,158 feet (3,401 m)	Interstate 70 to Denver. The highest point on the interstate system in the US. Avoids Loveland Pass. Pacific or Gulf of Mexico drainage.
39°39′49″N 105°52′45″W	A	Loveland Pass	11,990 ft (3,655 m)	US Highway 6. Pacific or Gulf of Mexico drainage.
39°21′42″N 106°03′45″W	A	Hoosier Pass	11,542 ft (3,518 m)	Colorado State Highway 9. Pacific or Gulf of Mexico drainage.
39°21′59″N 106°11′12″W	AR	Fremont Pass	11,318 feet (3,450 m)	Colorado State Highway 91, former railroad lines of Denver, South Park and Pacific Railroad whose southern approach is operated by Leadville, Colorado and Southern Railroad and Denver and Rio Grande Western Railroad.
39°21′45″N 106°18′40″W	AR	Tennessee Pass	10,424 ft (3,177 m)	U.S. Route 24, former Denver and Rio Grande Western Railroad main line.
39°15′54″N 106°29′02″W	R	Hagerman Pass	11,925 feet (3,635 m)	Former Colorado Midland Railway via Hagerman Tunnel and later Busk–Ivanhoe Tunnel, unpaved road.
39°6′29″N 106°33′52″W	A	Independence Pass	12,095 ft (3,687 m)	Colorado State Highway 82. Until 2019, the highest paved crossing of Divide in US; now the second-highest behind Cottonwood Pass (see next line). Pacific or Gulf of Mexico drainage.
38°49′40″N 106°24′33″W	A	Cottonwood Pass	12,126 ft (3,696 m)	Chaffee County Road 306 and Gunnison County Road 209. Until 2019, the highest unpaved road crossing of a pass in Colorado; now the highest paved crossing of Divide in US. Pacific or Gulf of Mexico drainage.
38°38′45″N 106°24′32″W	*R	Alpine Tunnel	11,523 feet (3,512 m)	Alpine Tunnel, first tunnel over Continental Divide in Colorado, highest railroad tunnel and at 1,772 ft (540 m) longest narrow-gauge tunnel in North America. Tunnel abandoned since 1910, impassable, unpaved road on approaches, reconstructed telegraph office with station platform near southern (wester
38°29′48″N 106°19′30″W	A	Monarch Pass	11,312 ft (3,448 m)	US Highway 50. Pacific or Gulf of Mexico drainage.
38°23′29″N 106°14′50″W	AR	Marshall Pass	10,842 ft (3,305 m)	former narrow-gauge railroad closed in 1955. Pacific or Gulf of Mexico drainage.
38°13′00″N 106°34′32″W	A	North Pass	10,010 ft (3,051 m)	Colorado State Highway 114. Pacific or Gulf of Mexico drainage.
37°56′27″N 107°09′33″W	A	Spring Creek Pass	10,889 ft (3,319 m)	Traversed by Colorado State Highway 149, notably lower than Slumgullion Pass dividing just tributaries of Gunnison River that is also traversed by SH 149.
37°29′00″N 106°48′11″W	A	Wolf Creek Pass	10,857 ft (3,309 m)	U.S. Highway 160. Pacific or Gulf of Mexico drainage.
37°00'N*	Colorado south border			

== Passes including Trails ==
Rocky Mountain passes on the Continental Divide of the Americas
Pass	Region	Elevation	Location	Access
Pine Pass	British Columbia	875 m 2,871 ft	55.4000°N 122.6333°W	British Columbia Highway 97 Canadian National Railway
Jarvis Pass	British Columbia	1478 m 4,849 ft	54.0908°N 120.1583°W	Trail in Kakwa Provincial Park
McGregor Pass	British Columbia	1539 m 5,049 ft	53.9667°N 120.2167°W	Trail
Kakwa Pass	British Columbia	1570 m 5,151 ft	53.9667°N 120.1500°W	Trail in Kakwa Provincial Park
Casket Pass	Alberta; British Columbia	1631 m 5,351 ft	53.7764°N 119.9303°W	Trail
Forgetmenot Pass	Alberta; British Columbia	1783 m 5,850 ft	53.7522°N 119.8925°W	Trail
Fetherstonhaugh Pass	Alberta; British Columbia	1813 m 5,948 ft	53.7133°N 119.8522°W	Trail
Avalanche Pass	Alberta; British Columbia	1570 m 5,151 ft	53.6161°N 119.9108°W	Trail
Beaverdam Pass	Alberta; British Columbia	1509 m 4,951 ft	53.5767°N 119.8889°W	Trail
Shale Pass	Alberta; British Columbia	1905 m 6,250 ft	53.6061°N 119.7269°W	Trail
Loren Pass	Alberta; British Columbia	1539 m 5,049 ft	53.4997°N 119.8103°W	Trail
Jackpine Pass	Alberta; British Columbia	2020 m 6,627 ft	53.3586°N 119.4308°W	Trail
Bess Pass	Alberta; British Columbia	1620 m 5,315 ft	53.3300°N 119.3506°W	Trail in Jasper National Park
Carcajou Pass	Alberta; British Columbia	1570 m 5,151 ft	53.2303°N 119.2819°W	Trail between Jasper National Park and Mount Robson Provincial Park
Moose Pass	Alberta; British Columbia	2027 m 6,650 ft	53.2306°N 119.0181°W	Trail between Jasper National Park and Mount Robson Provincial Park
Robson Pass	Alberta; British Columbia	1597 m 5,240 ft	53.1669°N 119.1286°W	Trail between Jasper National Park and Mount Robson Provincial Park
Snowbird Pass	Alberta; British Columbia	2423 m 7,949 ft	53.1456°N 119.0494°W	Trail between Jasper National Park and Mount Robson Provincial Park
Upright Pass	Alberta; British Columbia	1996 m 6,549 ft	53.1347°N 118.7806°W	Trail between Jasper National Park and Mount Robson Provincial Park
Colonel Pass	Alberta; British Columbia	1874 m 6,148 ft	53.0722°N 118.7694°W	Trail between Jasper National Park and Mount Robson Provincial Park
Grant Pass	Alberta; British Columbia	1935 m 6,348 ft	53.0478°N 118.7556°W	Trail between Jasper National Park and Mount Robson Provincial Park
North Miette Pass	Alberta; British Columbia	2179 m 7,149 ft	53.0333°N 118.6542°W	Trail between Jasper National Park and Mount Robson Provincial Park
Miette Pass	Alberta; British Columbia	2004 m 6,575 ft	53.0167°N 118.6667°W	Trail
Centre Pass	Alberta; British Columbia	1989 m 6,526 ft	53.0133°N 118.6544°W	Trail
South Miette Pass	Alberta; British Columbia	2119 m 6,952 ft	52.9861°N 118.6625°W	Trail between Jasper National Park and Mount Robson Provincial Park
South Pass	Alberta; British Columbia	2141 m 7,024 ft	52.9864°N 118.6608°W	Trail
Yellowhead Pass	Alberta; British Columbia	1131 m 3,711 ft	52.8914°N 118.4644°W	between Jasper National Park and Mount Robson Provincial Park
Tonquin Pass	Alberta; British Columbia	1935 m 6,348 ft	52.7283°N 118.3394°W	Trail between Jasper National Park and Mount Robson Provincial Park
Whirlpool Pass	Alberta; British Columbia	1813 m 5,948 ft	52.4886°N 118.2333°W	Trail in Jasper National Park
Canoe Pass	Alberta; British Columbia	2057 m 6,749 ft	52.4258°N 118.2386°W	Trail in Jasper National Park
Athabasca Pass	Alberta; British Columbia	1753 m 5,751 ft	52.3822°N 118.1900°W	Trail in Jasper National Park
Fortress Pass	Alberta; British Columbia	1356 m 4,449 ft	52.3614°N 117.7056°W	Trail between Banff National Park and Hamber Provincial Park
Thompson Pass	Alberta; British Columbia	1996 m 6,549 ft	52.0411°N 117.2581°W	Trail in Banff National Park
Bush Pass	Alberta; British Columbia	2393 m 7,851 ft	51.7983°N 116.9689°W	Trail in Banff National Park
Howse Pass	Alberta; British Columbia	1539 m 5,049 ft	51.8000°N 116.7556°W	Trail in Banff National Park
Balfour Pass	Alberta; British Columbia	2454 m 8,051 ft	51.5872°N 116.4719°W	Trail between Banff National Park and Yoho National Park
Kicking Horse Pass	Alberta; British Columbia	1627 m 5,338 ft	51.4533°N 116.2856°W	between Banff National Park and Yoho National Park
Abbot Pass	Alberta; British Columbia	2922 m 9,587 ft	51.3639°N 116.2872°W	Trail between Banff National Park and Yoho National Park
Wenkchemna Pass	Alberta; British Columbia	2606 m 8,550 ft	51.3169°N 116.2714°W	Trail between Banff National Park and Yoho National Park
Vermilion Pass	Alberta; British Columbia	1661 m 5,449 ft	51.2275°N 116.0497°W	between Banff National Park and Kootenay National Park
Ball Pass	Alberta; British Columbia	2210 m 7,251 ft	51.1264°N 115.9886°W	Trail between Banff National Park and Kootenay National Park
Redearth Pass	Alberta; British Columbia	2088 m 6,850 ft	51.0861°N 115.8825°W	Trail in Banff National Park
Simpson Pass	Alberta; British Columbia	2118 m 6,949 ft	51.0792°N 115.8278°W	Trail between Banff National Park and Kootenay National Park
Citadel Pass	Alberta; British Columbia	2362 m 7,749 ft	51.0203°N 115.7103°W	Trail in Banff National Park
Fatigue Pass	Alberta; British Columbia	2393 m 7,851 ft	51.0136°N 115.6886°W	Trail in Banff National Park
Og Pass	Alberta; British Columbia	2301 m 7,549 ft	50.9494°N 115.6133°W	Trail between Banff National Park and Mount Assiniboine Provincial Park
Assiniboine Pass	Alberta; British Columbia	2179 m 7,149 ft	50.9264°N 115.6089°W	Trail between Banff National Park and Mount Assiniboine Provincial Park
Wonder Pass	Alberta; British Columbia	2393 m 7,851 ft	50.8922°N 115.5944°W	Trail between Banff National Park and Mount Assiniboine Provincial Park
Marvel Pass	Alberta; British Columbia	2118 m 6,949 ft	50.8411°N 115.5789°W	Trail in Banff National Park
Red Man Pass	Alberta; British Columbia	2332 m 7,651 ft	50.8028°N 115.5528°W	Trail in Banff National Park
White Man Pass	Alberta; British Columbia	2149 m 7,051 ft	50.7833°N 115.5000°W	Trail in Banff National Park
Spray Pass	Alberta; British Columbia	1935 m 6,348 ft	50.7467°N 115.4292°W	Trail in Banff National Park
Palliser Pass	Alberta; British Columbia	2088 m 6,850 ft	50.7081°N 115.3875°W	Trail in Banff National Park
North Kananaskis Pass	Alberta; British Columbia	2362 m 7,749 ft	50.6903°N 115.2981°W	Trail in Kananaskis Country
South Kananaskis Pass	Alberta; British Columbia	2301 m 7,549 ft	50.6389°N 115.2867°W	Trail in Kananaskis Country
Elk Pass	Alberta; British Columbia	1905 m 6,250 ft	50.5861°N 115.0742°W	Trail in Peter Lougheed Provincial Park
Weary Creek Gap	Alberta; British Columbia	2240 m 7,349 ft	50.3981°N 114.8533°W	Trail in Kananaskis Country
Gunsight Pass	Alberta; British Columbia	2393 m 7,851 ft	50.3250°N 114.8167°W	Trail in Kananaskis Country
Windy Pass (Alberta–British Columbia)	Alberta; British Columbia	2408 m 7,900 ft	50.0639°N 114.6750°W	Trail
Tornado Pass	Alberta; British Columbia	2149 m 7,051 ft	49.9675°N 114.6731°W	Trail
North Fork Pass	Alberta; British Columbia	1996 m 6,549 ft	49.9222°N 114.6894°W	Trail in Kananaskis Country
Racehorse Pass	Alberta; British Columbia	2118 m 6,949 ft	49.7714°N 114.6467°W	Trail
Deadman Pass	Alberta; British Columbia	1600 m 5,249 ft	49.7058°N 114.6606°W	Trail
Phillipps Pass	Alberta; British Columbia	1570 m 5,151 ft	49.6458°N 114.6625°W	Trail
Crowsnest Pass	Alberta; British Columbia	1358 m 4,455 ft	49.6281°N 114.6753°W	(Canadian Pacific Railway 1898)
Tent Mountain Pass	Alberta; British Columbia	1478 m 4,849 ft	49.5728°N 114.7217°W	Trail
Ptolemy Pass	Alberta; British Columbia	1722 m 5,650 ft	49.5553°N 114.6875°W	Trail
North Kootenay Pass	Alberta; British Columbia	2057 m 6,749 ft	49.4000°N 114.5667°W	Trail
Middle Kootenay Pass	Alberta; British Columbia	1935 m 6,348 ft	49.2603°N 114.4083°W	Trail
Sage Pass	Alberta; British Columbia	2149 m 7,051 ft	49.1386°N 114.1608°W	Trail in Waterton Lakes National Park
South Kootenay Pass	Alberta; British Columbia	2088 m 6,850 ft	49.1092°N 114.1494°W	Trail in Waterton Lakes National Park
Akamina Pass	Alberta; British Columbia	1783 m 5,850 ft	49.0244°N 114.0544°W	Trail in Waterton Lakes National Park
Logan Pass	Montana	6,653 ft 2028 m	48.6966°N 113.7182°W	Going-to-the-Sun Road in Glacier National Park
Gunsight Pass	Montana	6,949 ft 2118 m	48.6094°N 113.7382°W	Trail in Glacier National Park
Marias Pass	Montana	5,236 ft 1596 m	48.3166°N 113.3548°W	between Flathead National Forest and Lewis and Clark National Forest (Great Northern Railway 1891)
Badger Pass	Montana	6,312 ft 1924 m	48.1305°N 113.0376°W	Trail in Bob Marshall Wilderness
Lewis and Clark Pass	Montana	6,424 ft 1958 m	47.1427°N 112.4289°W	Trail between Helena National Forest and Lewis and Clark National Forest (Meriwether Lewis 1806)
Rogers Pass	Montana	5,630 ft 1716 m	47.0763°N 112.3706°W	Montana State Highway 200
Mullan Pass	Montana	5,223 ft 1592 m	46.6444°N 112.3147°W	and gravel road in Helena National Forest (Northern Pacific Railway 1883)
Gibbons Pass	Montana	6,138 ft 1871 m	45.7469°N 113.9142°W	Beaverhead National Forest Road 106 (William Clark 1806)
Chief Joseph Pass	Idaho; Montana	7,251 ft 2210 m	45.6846°N 113.9331°W	in Salmon National Forest to in Beaverhead National Forest
Elk Park Pass	Montana	6,352 ft 1936 m	46.0363°N 112.4592°W	(Great Northern Railway 1888-1972)
Deer Lodge Pass	Montana	5,922 ft 1805 m	45.8833°N 112.6717°W	Interstate 15 Union Pacific Railroad
Homestake Pass	Montana	6,365 ft 1940 m	45.9221°N 112.4161°W	in Deerlodge National Forest (Northern Pacific Railroad 1888-1983)
Pipestone Pass	Montana	6,476 ft 1974 m	45.8566°N 112.4395°W	in Deerlodge National Forest (Chicago, Milwaukee, St. Paul and Pacific Railroad 1909-1980)
Lemhi Pass	Idaho; Montana	7,369 ft 2246 m	44.9744°N 113.4453°W	Gravel road between Beaverhead National Forest and Salmon National Forest (Lewis and Clark Expedition 1805)
Bannock Pass	Idaho; Montana	7,684 ft 2342 m	44.8144°N 113.2720°W	between Salmon National Forest and Beaverhead National Forest (Gilmore and Pittsburgh Railroad 1910-1939)
Monida Pass	Idaho; Montana	6,821 ft 2079 m	44.5583°N 112.3055°W	(Utah and Northern Railway 1880)
Raynolds Pass	Idaho; Montana	6,831 ft 2082 m	44.7110°N 111.4697°W	Idaho State Highway 87 Montana State Highway 87
Targhee Pass	Idaho; Montana	7,080 ft 2158 m	44.6746°N 111.2758°W	U.S. Route 20
Craig Pass	Wyoming	8,323 ft 2537 m	44.4416°N 110.7197°W	Grand Loop Road in Yellowstone National Park
Two Ocean Pass	Wyoming	8,130 ft 2478 m	44.0411°N 110.1674°W	Trail
South Pass	Wyoming	7,559 ft 2304 m	42.3700°N 108.9134°W	(Oregon Trail 1812, Mormon Trail 1847, California Trail 1848, Pony Express 1860-1861)
Bridger Pass	Wyoming	7,588 ft 2313 m	41.5505°N 107.4309°W	(Stansbury Expedition 1849, Cherokee Trail 1849, Overland Trail 1861)
Buffalo Pass	Colorado	10,295 ft 3138 m	40.5436°N 106.6850°W	Jackson County Road 24 and Routt County Road 38 in Routt National Forest
Rabbit Ears Pass	Colorado	9,429 ft 2874 m	40.3847°N 106.6117°W	U.S. Route 40 in Colorado
Muddy Pass	Colorado	8,619 ft 2627 m	40.3766°N 106.5798°W	between Arapahoe National Forest and Routt National Forest
La Poudre Pass	Colorado	10,184 ft 3104 m	40.4767°N 105.8233°W	Trail between Rocky Mountain National Park and Roosevelt National Forest
Willow Creek Pass	Colorado	9,659 ft 2944 m	40.3505°N 106.0922°W	Colorado State Highway 125 Bikecentennial
Milner Pass	Colorado	10,758 ft 3279 m	40.4197°N 105.8114°W	Trail Ridge Road in Rocky Mountain National Park
Ptarmigan Pass	Colorado	12,168 ft 3709 m	40.3105°N 105.7011°W	Trail in Rocky Mountain National Park
Stone Man Pass	Colorado	12,506 ft 3812 m	40.2594°N 105.6528°W	Trail in Rocky Mountain National Park
Boulder-Grand Pass	Colorado	12,077 ft 3681 m	40.2244°N 105.6692°W	Trail in Rocky Mountain National Park
Buchanan Pass	Colorado	11,844 ft 3610 m	40.1311°N 105.6303°W	Trail in Indian Peaks Wilderness
Pawnee Pass	Colorado	12,542 ft 3823 m	40.0758°N 105.6350°W	Trail between Arapaho National Forest and Roosevelt National Forest
Arapaho Pass	Colorado	11,906 ft 3629 m	40.0144°N 105.6781°W	Trail in Indian Peaks Wilderness
Rollins Pass	Colorado	11,676 ft 3559 m	39.9342°N 105.6828°W	Primitive road in Arapahoe National Forest to trail in Roosevelt National Forest (Denver, Northwestern and Pacific Railway 1903)
Jones Pass	Colorado	12,454 ft 3796 m	39.7736°N 105.8892°W	Clear Creek County Road 202 to trail in Arapaho National Forest
Vasquez Pass	Colorado	11,693 ft 3564 m	39.7878°N 105.8292°W	Trail in Arapaho National Forest
Berthoud Pass	Colorado	11,325 ft 3452 m	39.7983°N 105.7778°W	in Arapaho National Forest
Loveland Pass	Colorado	11,995 ft 3656 m	39.6636°N 105.8792°W	in Arapaho National Forest
Argentine Pass	Colorado	13,205 ft 4025 m	39.6253°N 105.7825°W	Primitive road in Arapaho National Forest (Highest road over the Continental Divide in North America)
Webster Pass (Colorado)	Colorado	12,103 ft 3689 m	39.5311°N 105.8328°W	Primitive road between Arapaho National Forest and Pike National Forest
Georgia Pass (Colorado)	Colorado	11,585 ft 3531 m	39.4583°N 105.9167°W	Primitive road between the town of Jefferson to Breckenridge, passing along Mt. Guyot.
Meyer Pass (Colorado)	Colorado	11,683 ft 3561 m	39.4020°N 105.9911°W	Primitive trail between Como and Breckenridge, connecting with Coronet Road.
French Pass	Colorado	12,050 ft 3673 m	39.4394°N 105.9514°W	Trail between Arapaho National Forest and Pike National Forest
Fremont Pass	Colorado	11,279 ft 3438 m	39.3664°N 106.1867°W	in San Isabel National Forest to Arapaho National Forest (Denver, South Park and Pacific Railroad 1888)
Black Powder Pass	Colorado	12,149 ft 3703 m	39.4236°N 105.9553°W	Trace between Arapaho National Forest and Pike National Forest
Boreas Pass	Colorado	11,499 ft 3505 m	39.4111°N 105.9695°W	Park County Road 33 in Pike National Forest to Summit County Road 10 in Arapaho National Forest (Denver, South Park and Pacific Railroad 1882)
Hagerman Pass	Colorado	11,939 ft 3639 m	39.2650°N 106.4839°W	Primitive road between San Isabel National Forest and White River National Forest (Colorado Midland Railway 1887)
Hoosier Pass	Colorado	11,532 ft 3515 m	39.3617°N 106.0625°W	between Arapaho National Forest and Pike National Forest (John C. Fremont 1844)
Independence Pass	Colorado	12,103 ft 3689 m	39.1089°N 106.5639°W	between San Isabel National Forest and White River National Forest
Red Mountain Pass	Colorado	12,860 ft 3920 m	39.0133°N 106.5949°W	Trail in Collegiate Peaks Wilderness
Lake Pass	Colorado	12,218 ft 3724 m	38.9969°N 106.5620°W	Trail between Gunnison National Forest and San Isabel National Forest
Browns Pass	Colorado	11,998 ft 3657 m	38.8539°N 106.3595°W	Trail in Collegiate Peaks Wilderness
Cottonwood Pass	Colorado	12,119 ft 3694 m	38.8278°N 106.4092°W	Chaffee County Road 306 in San Isabel National Forest to Gunnison County Road 209 in Gunnison National Forest (Highest paved road over the Continental Divide in North America)
Tincup Pass	Colorado	11,952 ft 3643 m	38.7153°N 106.4345°W	Primitive road between Gunnison National Forest and San Isabel National Forest
Hancock Pass	Colorado	12,208 ft 3721 m	38.6208°N 106.3742°W	Primitive road between Gunnison National Forest and San Isabel National Forest
Original Monarch Pass	Colorado	11,532 ft 3515 m	38.5114°N 106.3470°W	Abandoned wagon road between Gunnison National Forest and San Isabel National Forest
Old Monarch Pass	Colorado	11,365 ft 3464 m	38.4979°N 106.3378°W	Primitive road between Gunnison National Forest and San Isabel National Forest
Monarch Pass	Colorado	11,306 ft 3446 m	38.4967°N 106.3256°W	between Gunnison National Forest and San Isabel National Forest
Marshall Pass	Colorado	10,882 ft 3317 m	38.3914°N 106.2472°W	Saguache County Road 32 between Gunnison National Forest and San Isabel National Forest (Denver & Rio Grande Railroad 1881-1955)
North Pass	Colorado	10,010 ft 3051 m	38.2167°N 106.5756°W	Colorado State Highway 114
Cochetopa Pass	Colorado	10,041 ft 3060 m	38.1667°N 106.6006°W	Saguache County Road NN14 between Gunnison National Forest and Rio Grande National Forest
Spring Creek Pass	Colorado	10,889 ft 3319 m	37.9408°N 107.1592°W	Colorado State Highway 149
Stony Pass	Colorado	12,592 ft 3838 m	37.7953°N 107.5495°W	Primitive road between San Juan National Forest and Rio Grande National Forest
Wolf Creek Pass	Colorado	10,823 ft 3299 m	37.4825°N 106.7989°W	U.S. Route 160

== See also ==
- Rocky Mountains
  - Canadian Rockies
  - Central Rocky Mountains
  - Western Rocky Mountains
  - Southern Rocky Mountains
- Mountain pass
  - List of mountain passes in Colorado
  - List of mountain passes in Montana
  - List of mountain passes in Wyoming
  - List of passes of the Rocky Mountains
  - List of railroad crossings of the Continental Divide of North America
