= Elk Pass =

Elk Pass can refer to:

- Elk Pass (Canada), through the Rocky Mountains in Alberta and British Columbia, Canada.
- Elk Pass (Washington), through the Cascade Mountains in Washington state, United States
- Elk Pass in Mountain passes in Montana
