= List of mountain passes in Montana (A–L) =

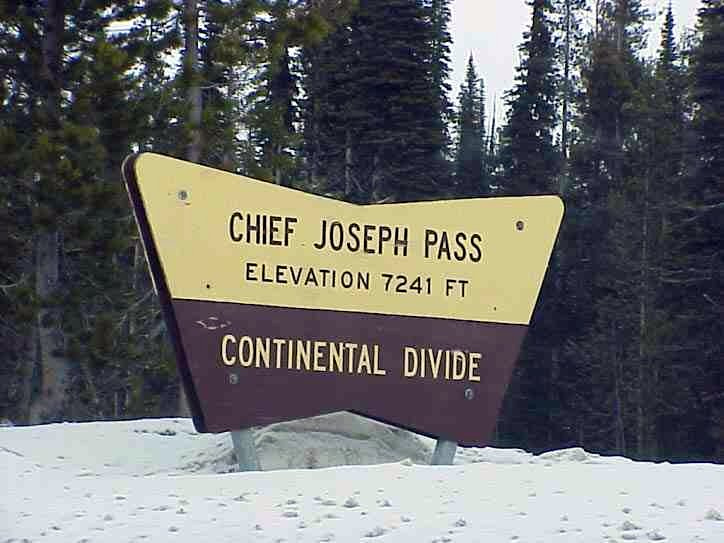
Chief Joseph Pass

There are at least 290 named mountain passes in Montana, including:

- Ahern Pass, Glacier County, Montana, 48°49′19″N 113°45′59″W, el. 7,116 feet (2,169 m)
- Alder Pass, Beaverhead County, Montana, 45°44′42″N 113°10′04″W, el. 8,543 feet (2,604 m)
- Ambrose Saddle, Ravalli County, Montana, 46°31′00″N 113°50′57″W, el. 5,889 feet (1,795 m)
- Antelope Pass, Valley County, Montana, 48°45′15″N 106°56′33″W, el. 2,641 feet (805 m)
- Antone Pass, Beaverhead County, Montana, 44°47′19″N 112°11′31″W, el. 8,589 feet (2,618 m)
- Badger Pass, Beaverhead County, Montana, 45°14′02″N 112°57′01″W, el. 6,755 feet (2,059 m)
- Badger Pass, Flathead County, Montana, 48°07′50″N 113°02′15″W, el. 6,312 feet (1,924 m)
- Bannack Pass, Beaverhead County, Montana, 44°28′42″N 112°47′11″W, el. 7,674 feet (2,339 m)
- Bannock Pass, Beaverhead County, Montana, 44°48′52″N 113°16′19″W, el. 7,684 feet (2,342 m)
- Battle Ridge Pass, Gallatin County, Montana, 45°52′44″N 110°53′05″W, el. 6,306 feet (1,922 m)
- Bear Creek Pass, Ravalli County, Montana, 46°06′59″N 114°29′38″W, el. 6,197 feet (1,889 m)
- Bear Creek Pass, Ravalli County, Montana, 46°26′09″N 114°22′39″W, el. 7,779 feet (2,371 m)
- Bear Creek Saddle, Ravalli County, Montana, 45°49′57″N 114°04′51″W, el. 5,748 feet (1,752 m)
- Beaverhead Canyon Gateway, Beaverhead County, Montana, 45°07′48″N 112°44′30″W, el. 5,236 feet (1,596 m)
- Big Hole Pass, Beaverhead County, Montana, 45°19′50″N 113°14′28″W, el. 7,408 feet (2,258 m)
- Big Hole Pass, Beaverhead County, Montana, 45°32′59″N 113°49′13″W, el. 7,057 feet (2,151 m)
- Bitterroot Pass, Granite County, Montana, 45°56′49″N 113°32′57″W, el. 8,412 feet (2,564 m)
- Blacktail Pass, Gallatin County, Montana, location unknown, el. 8,386 feet (2,556 m)
- Blodgett Pass, Ravalli County, Montana, 46°16′23″N 114°26′38″W, el. 6,785 feet (2,068 m)
- Bobcat Pass, Carbon County, Montana, 45°04′25″N 108°51′10″W, el. 4,475 feet (1,364 m)
- Bobcat Saddle, Ravalli County, Montana, 46°02′44″N 114°03′35″W, el. 6,496 feet (1,980 m)
- Boulder Pass, Flathead County, Montana, 48°57′41″N 114°05′31″W, el. 7,441 feet (2,268 m)
- Boulder Pass, Park County, Montana, 45°10′29″N 110°14′42″W, el. 9,649 feet (2,941 m)
- Bozeman Pass, Gallatin County, Montana, 45°40′02″N 110°48′28″W, el. 5,702 feet (1,738 m)
- Brewster Tyler Saddle, Granite County, Montana, 46°38′13″N 113°30′28″W, el. 5,256 feet (1,602 m)
- Brown Pass, Valley County, Montana, 47°47′03″N 106°57′17″W, el. 2,520 feet (770 m)
- Brown Pass, Glacier County, Montana, 48°57′04″N 114°02′08″W, el. 6,266 feet (1,910 m)
- Browns Meadow Pass, Flathead County, Montana, 47°56′10″N 114°32′37″W, el. 4,715 feet (1,437 m)
- Buck Creek Saddle, Ravalli County, Montana, 45°46′42″N 114°13′07″W, el. 6,443 feet (1,964 m)
- Buck Horn Saddle, Ravalli County, Montana, 46°11′23″N 113°56′12″W, el. 6,010 feet (1,830 m)
- Buffalo Horn Pass, Gallatin County, Montana, 45°08′04″N 111°06′20″W, el. 8,530 feet (2,600 m)
- Bull of the Woods Pass, Park County, Montana, 45°02′54″N 109°57′57″W, el. 9,875 feet (3,010 m)
- Bullion Pass, Mineral County, Montana, 47°24′26″N 115°40′39″W, el. 5,426 feet (1,654 m)
- Burr Saddle, Sanders County, Montana, 47°17′35″N 115°01′38″W, el. 3,425 feet (1,044 m)
- Burr Saddle, Mineral County, Montana, 47°17′36″N 115°01′44″W, el. 3,389 feet (1,033 m)
- Cache Saddle, Mineral County, Montana, 46°41′51″N 114°45′18″W, el. 7,008 feet (2,136 m)
- Cadotte Pass, Lewis and Clark County, Montana, 47°05′58″N 112°23′37″W, el. 6,073 feet (1,851 m)
- Camp Creek Pass, Powell County, Montana, 47°29′04″N 113°06′02″W, el. 7,142 feet (2,177 m)
- Camp Pass, Lewis and Clark County, Montana, 47°11′25″N 113°03′24″W, el. 6,762 feet (2,061 m)
- Camps Pass, Powder River County, Montana, 45°33′07″N 105°53′34″W, el. 3,924 feet (1,196 m)
- Carney Pass, Lincoln County, Montana, 48°01′23″N 115°33′40″W, el. 6,174 feet (1,882 m)
- Cayuse Saddle, Mineral County, Montana, 47°07′31″N 115°00′14″W, el. 3,547 feet (1,081 m)
- Champion Pass, Jefferson County, Montana, 46°14′22″N 112°35′10″W, el. 6,968 feet (2,124 m)
- Chief Joseph Pass, Beaverhead County, Montana, 45°41′05″N 113°55′59″W, el. 7,251 feet (2,210 m)
- Chilcoot Pass, Mineral County, Montana, 46°51′55″N 114°53′58″W, el. 6,772 feet (2,064 m)
- Chilkoot Pass, Garfield County, Montana, 47°46′30″N 106°31′28″W, el. 2,484 feet (757 m)
- Cinnabar Saddle, Ravalli County, Montana, 46°34′36″N 113°49′48″W, el. 6,476 feet (1,974 m)
- Cinnamon Bear Saddle, Granite County, Montana, 46°32′14″N 113°50′42″W, el. 6,443 feet (1,964 m)
- Colter Pass, Park County, Montana, 45°01′36″N 109°53′27″W, el. 8,048 feet (2,453 m)
- Columbine Pass, Sweet Grass County, Montana, 45°12′40″N 110°07′01″W, el. 9,882 feet (3,012 m)
- Comeau Pass, Flathead County, Montana, 48°37′16″N 113°46′23″W, el. 8,025 feet (2,446 m)
- Cooper Pass, Sanders County, Montana, 47°31′30″N 115°42′17″W, el. 5,791 feet (1,765 m)
- Coriacan Defile, Missoula County, Montana, 47°04′28″N 114°03′56″W, el. 3,891 feet (1,186 m)
- Crazy Horse Gap, Sheridan County, Montana, 48°37′04″N 104°39′37″W, el. 2,241 feet (683 m)
- Cube Iron Pass, Sanders County, Montana, 47°41′01″N 115°17′06″W, el. 6,621 feet (2,018 m)
- Cut Bank Pass, Glacier County, Montana, 48°31′13″N 113°28′19″W, el. 7,867 feet (2,398 m)
- Cutaway Pass, Deer Lodge County, Montana, 46°00′47″N 113°22′19″W, el. 9,039 feet (2,755 m)
- Daisy Creek Pass, Sanders County, Montana, 47°30′38″N 115°29′51″W, el. 4,902 feet (1,494 m)
- Daisy Narrows, Meagher County, Montana, 46°38′32″N 110°19′33″W, el. 6,224 feet (1,897 m)
- Daisy Notch, Meagher County, Montana, 46°40′32″N 110°17′22″W, el. 7,890 feet (2,400 m)
- Daisy Pass, Park County, Montana, 45°03′18″N 109°57′24″W, el. 9,770 feet (2,980 m)
- Daley Gap, Fergus County, Montana, 46°48′02″N 108°53′27″W, el. 4,383 feet (1,336 m)
- Daly Pass, Gallatin County, Montana, 45°06′19″N 111°06′53″W, el. 8,350 feet (2,550 m)
- Dawson Pass, Glacier County, Montana, 48°29′14″N 113°28′19″W, el. 7,585 feet (2,312 m)
- Deadman Pass, Beaverhead County, Montana, 44°48′13″N 113°12′09″W, el. 7,746 feet (2,361 m)
- Deer Lodge Pass, Silver Bow County, Montana, 45°53′00″N 112°40′18″W, el. 5,922 feet (1,805 m)
- Deer Pass, McCone County, Montana, 47°47′50″N 106°01′10″W, el. 2,552 feet (778 m)
- Duck Creek Pass, Broadwater County, Montana, 46°29′37″N 111°15′16″W, el. 7,477 feet (2,279 m)
- Durfee Gap, Fergus County, Montana, 46°47′39″N 108°52′36″W, el. 4,357 feet (1,328 m)
- Eagle Pass, Lake County, Montana, (Salish: nšt̓ew̓s sx̣ʷcusi)47°26′32″N 113°56′43″W, el. 7,464 feet (2,275 m)
- Eagle Rock Saddle, Mineral County, Montana, 47°03′48″N 114°52′25″W, el. 5,705 feet (1,739 m)
- East Fork Pass, Sanders County, Montana, 47°29′09″N 115°30′00″W, el. 5,262 feet (1,604 m)
- East Fork Pass, Mineral County, Montana, 47°29′27″N 115°31′28″W, el. 5,554 feet (1,693 m)
- Echo Pass, Powell County, Montana, 47°06′45″N 112°53′20″W, el. 7,408 feet (2,258 m)
- Elbow Gorge, Teton County, Montana, 47°37′23″N 112°50′27″W, el. 4,731 feet (1,442 m)
- Elbow Pass, Lewis and Clark County, Montana, 47°24′05″N 112°51′56″W, el. 6,519 feet (1,987 m)
- Elk Horn Pass, Meagher County, Montana, 46°46′48″N 111°05′32″W, el. 5,052 feet (1,540 m)
- Elk Park Pass, Silver Bow County, Montana, 46°02′11″N 112°27′33″W, el. 6,352 feet (1,936 m)
- Elk Pass, Sanders County, Montana, 47°18′10″N 114°13′22″W, el. 4,071 feet (1,241 m)
- Elk Pass, Lake County, Montana, 47°27′14″N 113°55′19″W, el. 7,008 feet (2,136 m)
- Elk Pass, Lewis and Clark County, Montana, 47°19′45″N 112°38′19″W, el. 6,004 feet (1,830 m)
- Elk Saddle, Judith Basin County, Montana, 46°56′52″N 110°29′37″W, el. 7,733 feet (2,357 m)
- Emigrant Gap, Glacier County, Montana, 48°58′57″N 113°05′29″W, el. 4,485 feet (1,367 m)
- Expedition Pass, Madison County, Montana, 44°57′50″N 111°27′47″W, el. 10,207 feet (3,111 m)
- Firebrand Pass, Flathead County, Montana, 48°23′28″N 113°20′20″W, el. 6,952 feet (2,119 m)
- Flat Creek Pass, Chouteau County, Montana, 47°42′40″N 109°56′51″W, el. 3,002 feet (915 m)
- Flathead Pass, Gallatin County, Montana, 45°58′55″N 111°00′52″W, el. 6,834 feet (2,083 m)
- Flesher Pass, Lewis and Clark County, Montana, 46°58′31″N 112°21′30″W, el. 6,138 feet (1,871 m)
- Fred Burr Pass, Granite County, Montana, 46°17′29″N 113°10′27″W, el. 8,081 feet (2,463 m)
- Freeman Pass, Lake County, Montana, 47°18′24″N 113°52′54″W, el. 7,907 feet (2,410 m)
- Freezeout Pass, Mineral County, Montana, 47°01′50″N 115°01′21″W, el. 6,204 feet (1,891 m)
- Gable Pass, Glacier County, Montana, 48°54′56″N 113°38′07″W, el. 7,214 feet (2,199 m)
- Gaffeney Pass, Sheridan County, Montana, 48°27′45″N 104°19′24″W, el. 1,942 feet (592 m)
- Game Pass, Granite County, Montana, 46°25′36″N 113°03′46″W, el. 8,077 feet (2,462 m)
- Gates of the Rocky Mountains, Lewis and Clark County, Montana, 46°52′37″N 111°54′50″W, el. 3,583 feet (1,092 m)
- Gateway Gorge, Flathead County, Montana, 48°02′58″N 112°59′36″W, el. 5,942 feet (1,811 m)
- Gateway Pass, Flathead County, Montana, 48°03′12″N 112°56′42″W, el. 6,483 feet (1,976 m)
- Getaway Pass, Lake County, Montana, 47°18′39″N 114°11′05″W, el. 4,035 feet (1,230 m)
- Gibbons Pass, Beaverhead County, Montana, 45°44′49″N 113°54′51″W, el. 6,945 feet (2,117 m)
- Glidden Pass, Sanders County, Montana, 47°32′01″N 115°42′45″W, el. 5,777 feet (1,761 m)
- Goat Pass, Missoula County, Montana, 47°19′43″N 113°52′07″W, el. 7,835 feet (2,388 m)
- Goldstone Pass, Beaverhead County, Montana, 45°08′37″N 113°33′57″W, el. 9,055 feet (2,760 m)
- Gordon Pass, Missoula County, Montana, 47°26′37″N 113°30′46″W, el. 6,791 feet (2,070 m)
- Granite Pass, Missoula County, Montana, 46°39′33″N 114°37′43″W, el. 5,695 feet (1,736 m)
- Granulated Pass, Silver Bow County, Montana, 45°52′08″N 112°56′49″W, el. 8,651 feet (2,637 m)
- Griffin Pass, Powder River County, Montana, 45°38′50″N 105°50′06″W, el. 3,701 feet (1,128 m)
- Guide Saddle, Ravalli County, Montana, 45°54′11″N 113°53′02″W, el. 5,846 feet (1,782 m)
- Gunsight Pass, Glacier County, Montana, 48°36′34″N 113°44′17″W, el. 6,949 feet (2,118 m)
- Hagen Gap, Garfield County, Montana, 47°23′43″N 106°26′24″W, el. 2,690 feet (820 m)
- Hahn Creek Pass, Powell County, Montana, 47°18′47″N 113°11′52″W, el. 6,683 feet (2,037 m)
- Haines Pass, Flathead County, Montana, 48°40′15″N 114°31′01″W, el. 6,197 feet (1,889 m)
- Half Moon Pass, Fergus County, Montana, 46°45′59″N 109°20′18″W, el. 7,303 feet (2,226 m)
- Hardrobe Water Gap, Big Horn County, Montana, 45°28′59″N 106°48′23″W, el. 3,930 feet (1,200 m)
- Haskell Pass, Flathead County, Montana, 48°09′53″N 114°44′44″W, el. 4,304 feet (1,312 m)
- Hatcher Pass, Carbon County, Montana, 45°10′19″N 108°55′23″W, el. 4,088 feet (1,246 m)
- Haymaker Narrows, Wheatland County, Montana, 46°39′06″N 110°09′01″W, el. 5,912 feet (1,802 m)
- Headquarters Creek Pass, Teton County, Montana, 47°49′18″N 112°48′27″W, el. 7,749 feet (2,362 m)
- Hell Gate, McCone County, Montana, 47°48′07″N 106°03′11″W, el. 2,467 feet (752 m)
- Hellroaring Pass, Lake County, Montana, 47°40′51″N 113°57′38″W, el. 6,922 feet (2,110 m)
- Hidden Lake Pass, Glacier County, Montana, 48°41′12″N 113°44′12″W, el. 7,159 feet (2,182 m)
- Himes Pass, Sanders County, Montana, 47°54′43″N 115°21′44″W, el. 4,921 feet (1,500 m)
- Holloman Saddle, Missoula County, Montana, 46°43′41″N 113°50′58″W, el. 5,882 feet (1,793 m)
- Homestake Pass, Jefferson County, Montana, 45°55′20″N 112°24′58″W, el. 6,365 feet (1,940 m)
- Hoodoo Pass, Mineral County, Montana, 46°58′32″N 115°01′35″W, el. 5,997 feet (1,828 m)
- Hoodoo Pass, Madison County, Montana, 44°44′06″N 111°37′36″W, el. 7,510 feet (2,290 m)
- Horse Creek Pass, Ravalli County, Montana, 45°30′11″N 114°23′45″W, el. 7,264 feet (2,214 m)
- Hungry Creek Pass, McCone County, Montana, 47°58′19″N 106°11′42″W, el. 2,326 feet (709 m)
- Iceberg Notch, Glacier County, Montana, 48°49′09″N 113°45′22″W, el. 8,317 feet (2,535 m)
- Inspiration Pass, Flathead County, Montana, 47°47′57″N 113°40′53″W, el. 6,965 feet (2,123 m)
- Inuya Pass, Flathead County, Montana, 48°51′47″N 114°40′32″W, el. 6,165 feet (1,879 m)
- Jefferson Pass, Glacier County, Montana, 48°53′45″N 114°02′15″W, el. 6,555 feet (1,998 m)
- Joan Creek Pass, Sanders County, Montana, 47°29′44″N 115°20′53″W, el. 4,593 feet (1,400 m)
- Jordan Pass, Sweet Grass County, Montana, 45°14′48″N 110°04′32″W, el. 9,380 feet (2,860 m)
- Kings Hill Pass, Meagher County, Montana, 46°50′28″N 110°41′43″W, el. 7,385 feet (2,251 m)
- Klondike Pass, Meagher County, Montana, 46°17′10″N 111°07′19″W, el. 6,778 feet (2,066 m)
- Knox Pass, Mineral County, Montana, 47°28′47″N 115°17′52″W, el. 5,174 feet (1,577 m)
- Kootenai Narrows, Lincoln County, Montana, 48°24′54″N 115°18′25″W, el. 2,464 feet (751 m)
- Kootenai Pass, Flathead County, Montana, 48°50′44″N 113°53′39″W, el. 5,722 feet (1,744 m)
- Larch Hill Pass, Flathead County, Montana, 47°43′52″N 113°09′41″W, el. 7,713 feet (2,351 m)
- Ledoford Pass, Madison County, Montana, 44°54′25″N 112°04′54″W, el. 8,166 feet (2,489 m)
- Lemhi Pass, Beaverhead County, Montana, 44°58′27″N 113°26′42″W, el. 7,382 feet (2,250 m)
- Lewis and Clark Pass, Lewis and Clark County, Montana, 47°08′34″N 112°25′44″W, el. 6,424 feet (1,958 m)
- Lick Creek Saddle, Ravalli County, Montana, 45°56′07″N 113°39′23″W, el. 6,755 feet (2,059 m)
- Limestone Pass, Powell County, Montana, 47°16′36″N 113°07′12″W, el. 7,424 feet (2,263 m)
- Lincoln Pass, Flathead County, Montana, 48°36′00″N 113°46′57″W, el. 6,998 feet (2,133 m)
- Lion Creek Pass, Flathead County, Montana, 47°41′26″N 113°35′55″W, el. 6,978 feet (2,127 m)
- Lions Pass, McCone County, Montana, 47°47′09″N 106°04′10″W, el. 2,638 feet (804 m)
- Lodgepole Saddle, Granite County, Montana, 46°39′13″N 113°32′57″W, el. 5,978 feet (1,822 m)
- Logan Pass, Glacier County, Montana, 48°41′48″N 113°43′05″W, el. 6,653 feet (2,028 m)
- Lolo Pass, Missoula County, Montana, 46°38′07″N 114°34′47″W, el. 5,223 feet (1,592 m)
- Lone Tree Pass, Beaverhead County, Montana, 44°38′47″N 111°32′19″W, el. 7,543 feet (2,299 m)
- Lone Tree Pass, Lake County, Montana, 47°21′56″N 113°53′14″W, el. 7,805 feet (2,379 m)
- Lookout Pass, Mineral County, Montana, 47°27′20″N 115°41′49″W, el. 4,751 feet (1,448 m)
- Lost Buck Pass, Lincoln County, Montana, 48°00′54″N 115°33′46″W, el. 5,912 feet (1,802 m)
- Lost Horse Pass, Ravalli County, Montana, 46°09′55″N 114°30′10″W, el. 6,634 feet (2,022 m)
- Low Pass, Deer Lodge County, Montana, 46°12′10″N 113°11′12″W, el. 6,552 feet (1,997 m)
- Low Pass, Madison County, Montana, 45°35′08″N 112°07′49″W, el. 9,042 feet (2,756 m)
- Lulu Pass, Park County, Montana, 45°04′11″N 109°57′34″W, el. 9,846 feet (3,001 m)

== See also ==
- List of mountain passes in Montana (M–Z)
- List of mountains in Montana
- List of mountain ranges in Montana
