= Elk Park =

Elk Park may refer to:

- Elk Park, North Carolina
- Elk Park Pass, near Butte, Montana
