= South Pass =

South Pass may refer to several places:

- South Pass (Canada), a Rocky Mountain pass on the continental divide
- South Pass (Louisiana), a channel of the Mississippi River in Plaquemines Parish, Louisiana, United States
- South Pass (Wyoming), two mountain passes on the Continental Divide, in the Rocky Mountains of southwestern Wyoming
- South Pass City, Wyoming, Fremont County, Wyoming

== See also ==
- South Passage (disambiguation)
- South Pasadena, California
