= List of mountain passes in Montana =

Mountain passes in Montana are listed in the following articles:

- List of mountain passes in Montana (A–L)
- List of mountain passes in Montana (M–Z)
