= Sawtooth Mountain (Boulder County, Colorado) =

Mountain in Colorado, United States

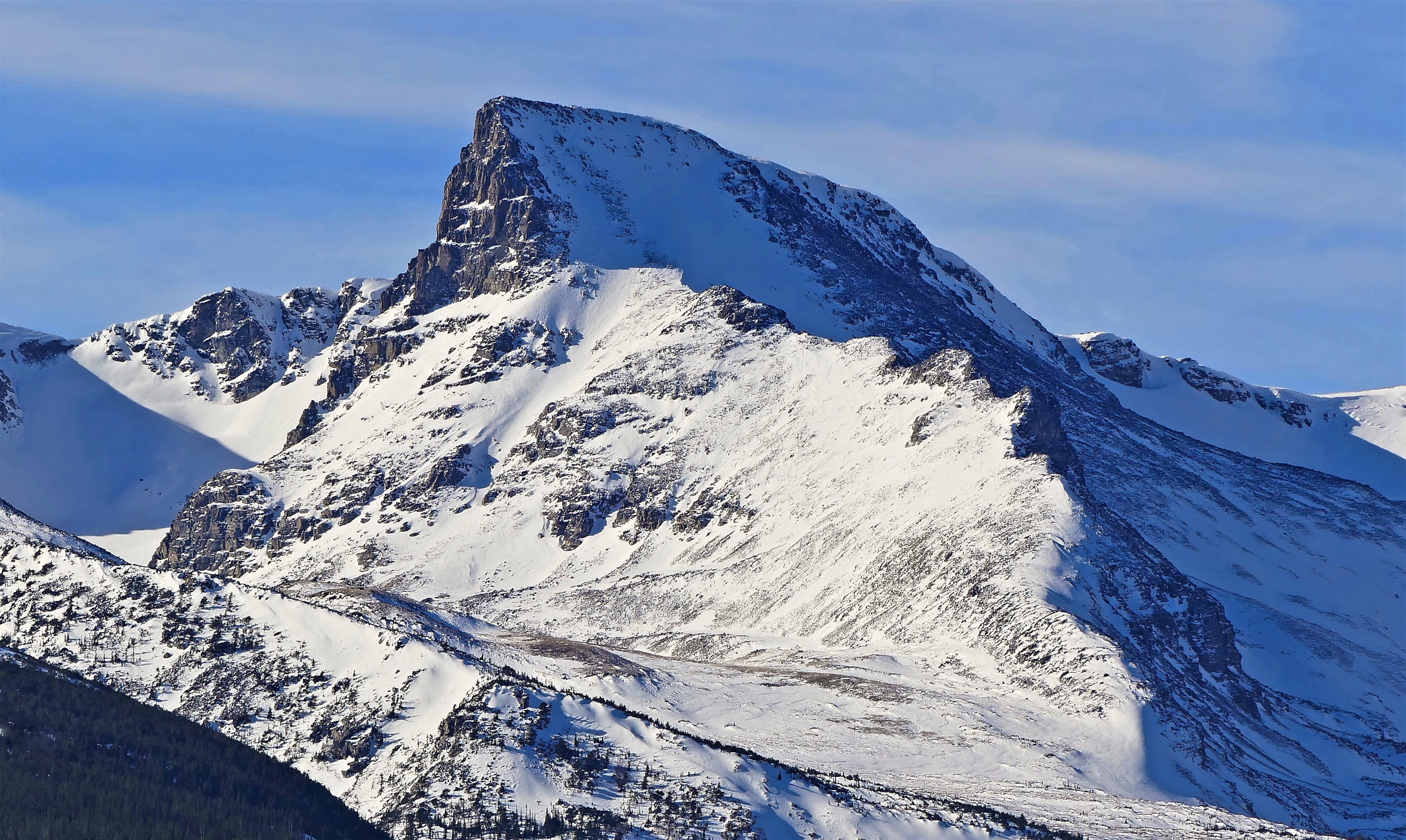
- East aspect

Highest point
- Elevation: 12,304 ft (3,750 m)
- Prominence: 382 ft (116 m)
- Parent peak: Algonquin (12,581 ft)
- Isolation: 0.85 mi (1.37 km)
- Coordinates: 40°07′37″N 105°37′28″W

Geography
- Location within Colorado Location within the United States
- Country: United States
- State: Colorado
- County: Boulder / Grand
- Protected area: Indian Peaks Wilderness
- Parent range: Rocky Mountains; Front Range
- Topo map: USGS Allens Park

Geology
- Rock age: Paleoproterozoic
- Rock type: Gneiss

Climbing
- Easiest route: class 2 via Buchanan Pass

Sawtooth Mountain is a 12,304-foot (3,750 m) summit on the boundary shared by Boulder County and Grand County, in Colorado, United States.

== Description ==
Sawtooth Mountain is set on the Continental Divide in the Front Range which is a subrange of the Rocky Mountains. It is the easternmost projection of the Continental Divide encompassing the entirety of North America. The mountain is located 20 miles (32 km) west-northwest of Boulder in the Indian Peaks Wilderness, on land managed by Arapaho National Forest and Roosevelt National Forest. It is the 19th-highest summit in the wilderness and 28th-highest in Boulder County. Precipitation runoff from the mountain's east slope drains into tributaries of St. Vrain Creek, whereas the west slope drains to Monarch Lake via Buchanan Creek, thence Lake Granby. Topographic relief is significant as the summit rises 2,300 feet (701 m) above Buchanan Creek in 1.3 mile. The mountain's toponym has been officially adopted by the United States Board on Geographic Names.

== Climate ==
According to the Köppen climate classification system, Sawtooth Mountain is located in an alpine subarctic climate zone with cold, snowy winters, and cool to warm summers. Due to its altitude, it receives precipitation all year, as snow in winter and as thunderstorms in summer, with a dry period in late spring. Climbers can expect afternoon rain, hail, and lightning from the seasonal monsoon in late July and August.

== Gallery ==
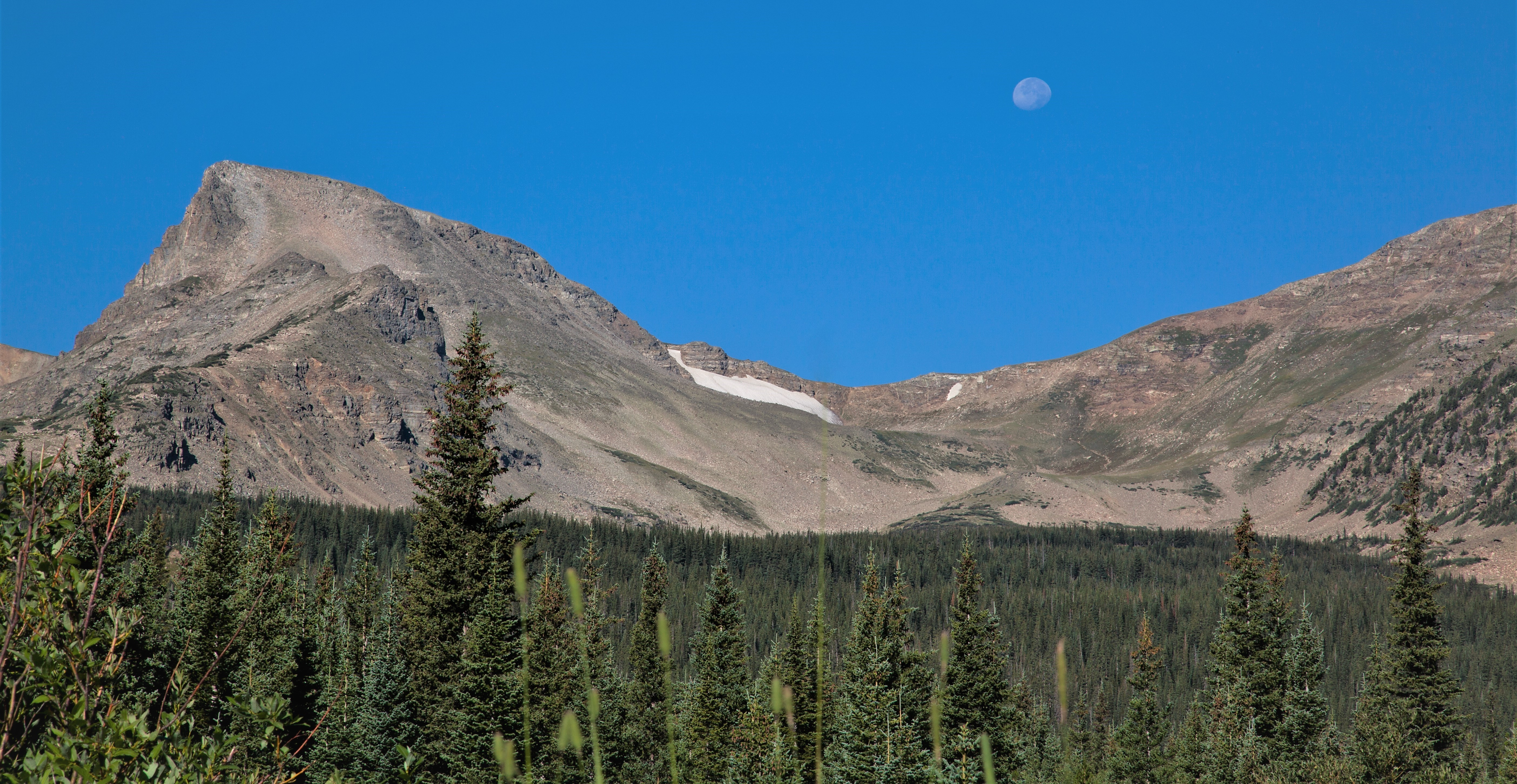
Buchanan Pass centered with Sawtooth to left

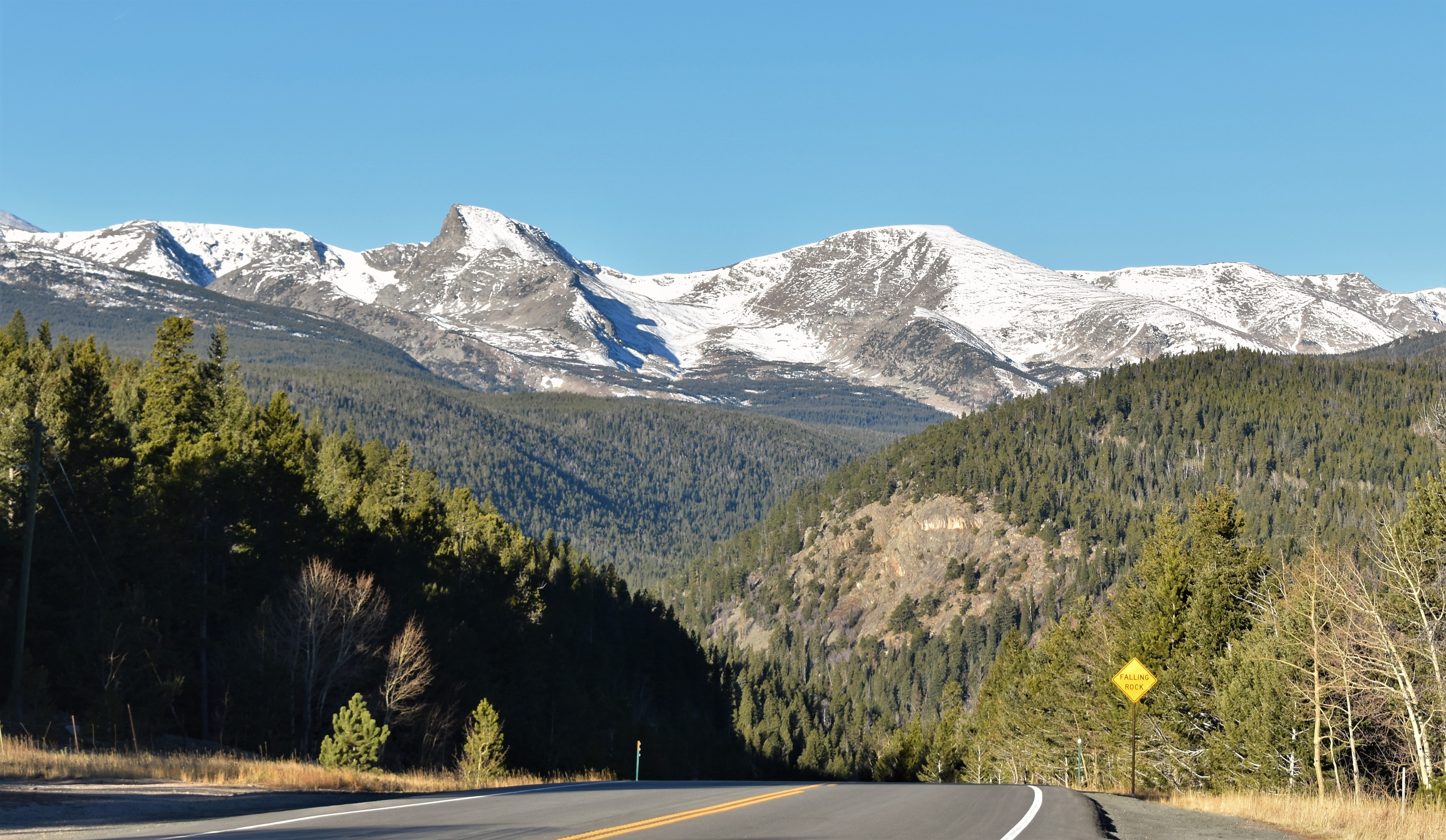
Sawtooth Mountain (left), Red Deer Mountain (right) from Peak to Peak Highway (Hwy 72)

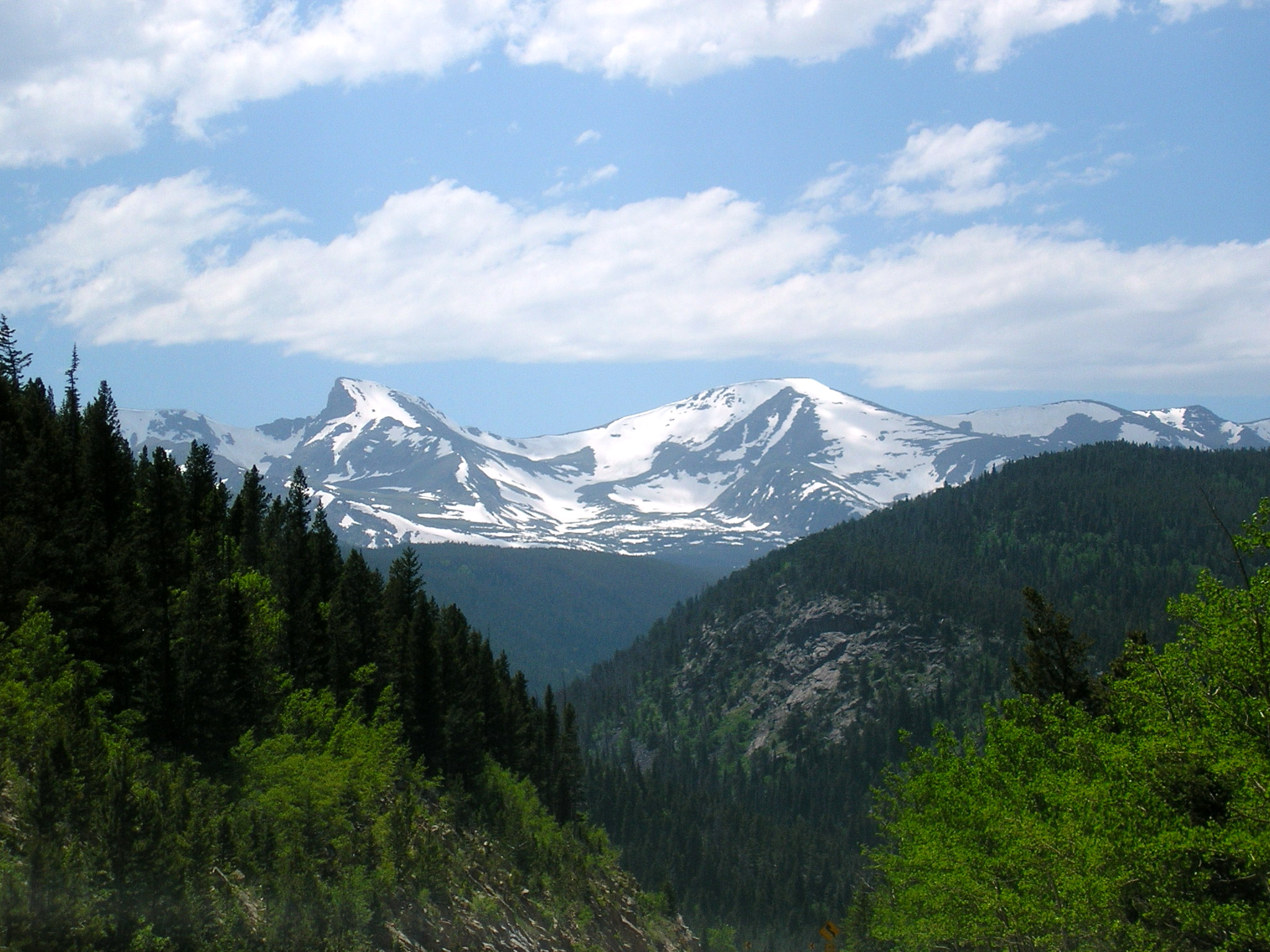
Sawtooth Mountain to left, Red Deer Mountain (12,391-ft) to the right

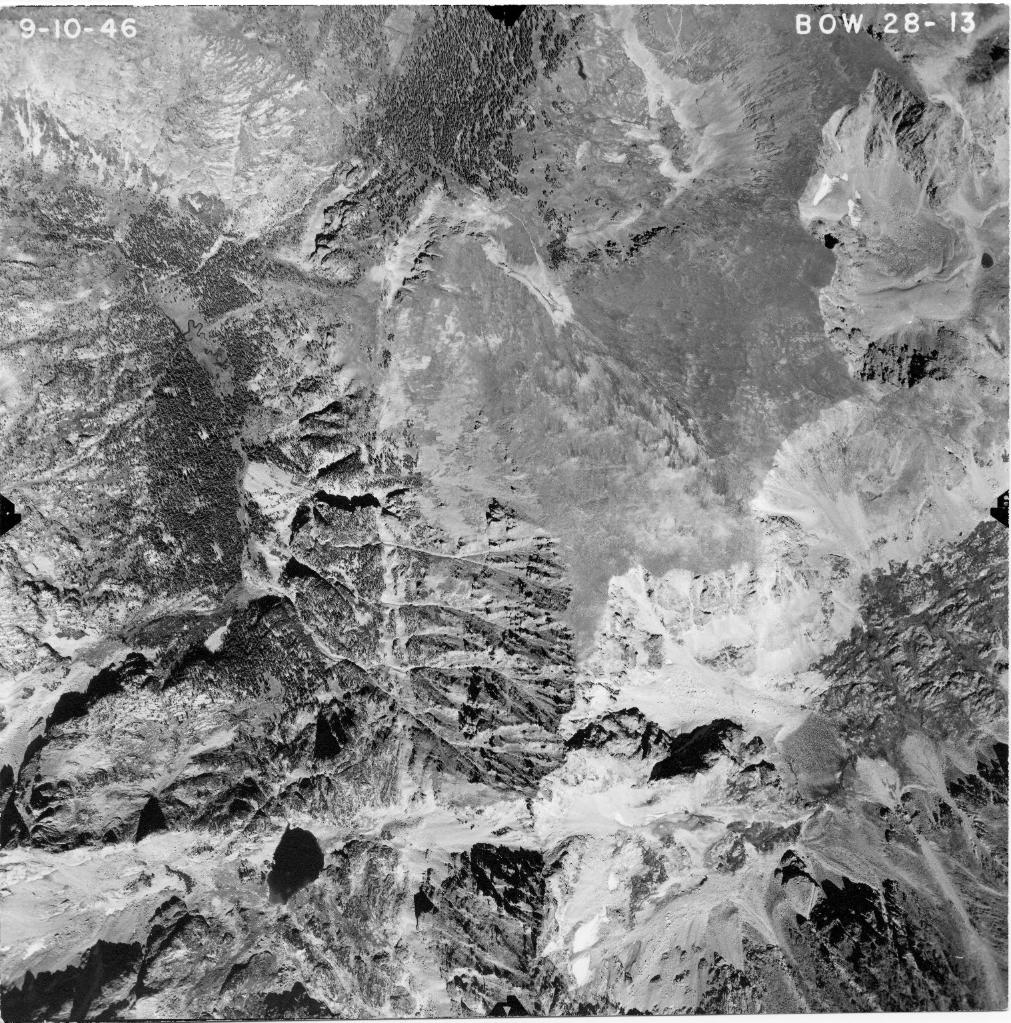
Sawtooth Mountain (upper, righthand side) as photographed by the United States Forest Service in 1946.

== See also ==
- Mountains of Boulder County, Colorado
