= South Passage =

South Passage may refer to:

- South Passage (Houtman Abrolhos), Western Australia, a channel
- South Passage (Queensland), a channel
- South Passage (Shark Bay), Western Australia, a channel

== See also ==
- South Pass (disambiguation)
