= A. B. Rogers =

American surveyor and civil engineer

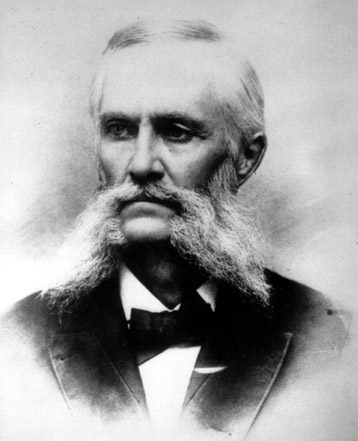
Rogers in the 1880s, from the CPR Archive

Albert Bowman Rogers (28 May 1829 – 4 May 1889), commonly known as Major A.B. Rogers, was an American surveyor now best remembered for his discovery of the Rogers Pass in British Columbia, Canada. He also has the distinction of having Rogers Pass in the U.S. state of Montana named after him, following his description of the pass in 1887.

== Early life ==
Born in Orleans, Massachusetts in 1829, he attended Brown University, but transferred after one year to Yale University, where he obtained a degree in Engineering. Rogers served with the U.S. Cavalry during the Indian Wars, attaining the rank of major during the 1862 Dakota Sioux uprising.

== Surveys for the Canadian Pacific Railway ==
His initial engineering experience was primarily on the American prairies surveying for the Chicago, Milwaukee, St. Paul and Pacific Railroad. Nevertheless, James Jerome Hill of the Canadian Pacific Railway hired Rogers in April 1881 to find a rail route through the Selkirk and Rocky Mountains. Rogers carefully studied the reports of earlier surveyors, particularly those of Walter Moberly from 1865. Moberly's assistant Albert Perry had previously described the approach to a potential pass from the Columbia River along the Illecillewaet River. In later years, Moberly claimed the pass should have been named Perry's Pass.

On May 28, 1881, his birthday, Rogers reached a pass at the head of the Illecillewaet River. (Some secondary sources state that he only saw the pass from a distance, but this is contradicted by first-hand reports.) Running out of food, the party turned back west. Although they had found a pass, they had been unable to explore its eastern approach, a distance of 18 miles (29 km) from the junction of the Beaver and Columbia Rivers. Returning in 1882, he approached from the east, following the Beaver River. On July 24, 1882, he reached the same pass, confirming its existence and the feasibility of a railway route.

In gratitude, the Canadian Pacific named the pass for him and presented Rogers with a cheque for $5,000. Rogers initially refused to cash the cheque, preferring rather to display it in a frame. It was not until Van Horne promised him a gold watch as a souvenir that he consented to cash the cheque.

Rogers was a tough task master and was disliked by many of those who worked under him. They suffered under basic and meagre food supplies while being driven to continue on. One party avoided starvation by sheer luck when they were able to quickly canoe downstream.

== Post Rogers Pass ==
In 1887, while surveying again for James J. Hill, but this time for the Great Northern Railway, he was searching for a pass over the continental divide and located Rogers Pass in Montana. Though the Great Northern eventually selected Marias Pass, 100 miles (160 km) to the north of Rogers Pass, as the continental divide pass for their transcontinental rail route, the Great Northern named Rogers Pass in Montana for the surveyor. Rogers Pass in Montana became the route of Montana Highway 200, the highway route between Great Falls and Missoula, Montana.

His surveying career was curtailed after he was badly injured falling from his horse while surveying the right-of-way for the Great Northern Railway near Coeur d'Alene, Idaho. He died 4 May 1889 at Waterville, Minnesota, where he spent retirement at the home of his brother. Although some sources report that he died as a result of his injuries, others indicate that he suffered from cancer of the stomach.
