= Big Hole Pass =

Mountain pass in Montana, United States

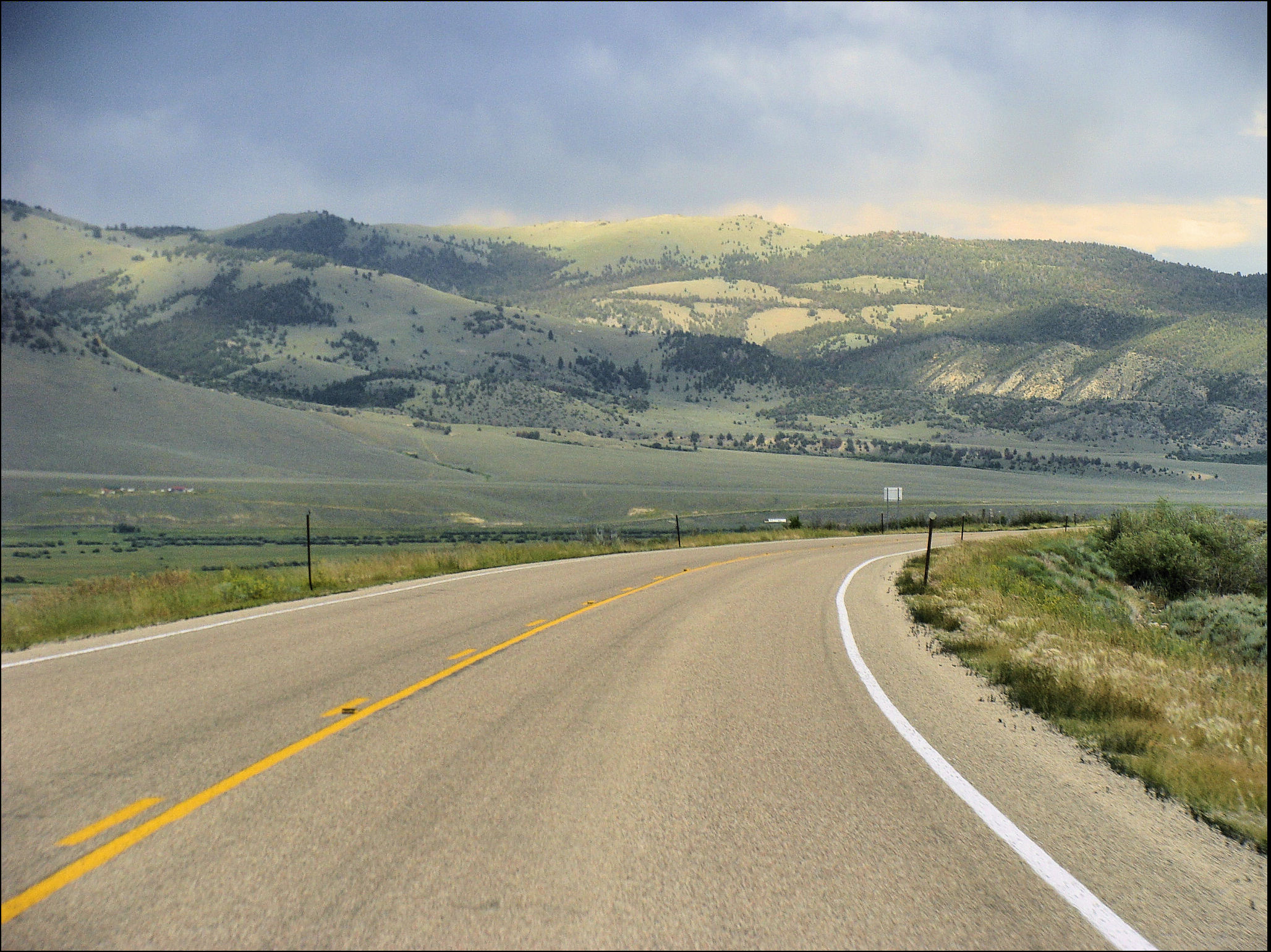
- Big Hole Pass from Big Hole Valley

- Location within the United States Location within Idaho
- Interactive map of Big Hole Pass
- Elevation: 7,055 ft (2,150 m)
- Traversed by: Continental Divide Trail

Third Approach
- Location: Beaverhead–Deerlodge National Forest, Beaverhead County, Montana; Salmon National Forest, Lemhi County, Idaho, U.S.
- Coordinates: 45°32′59″N 113°49′13″W
- Topo map: USGS Big Hole Pass

Big Hole Pass (elevation: 7,055 feet (2,150 m)) is a high mountain pass in the northern Rocky Mountains of the western United States. It is on the Montana–Idaho border, approximately eight miles (13 km) due south of Montana State Highway 43 in the Beaverhead–Deerlodge National Forest in Beaverhead County, Montana, and Salmon National Forest in Lemhi County, Idaho. Note: This location should not be confused with Big Hole Pass on Montana Highway 278 (between Wisdom and Polaris) at the height of land west of Dillon, that denotes the eastern entrance to the Big Hole valley.

The Continental Divide Trail goes over this pass, which is about eleven miles (18 km) south-southeast of the more famous Chief Joseph Pass. The pass can be approached from Gibbonsville, Idaho on a gravel Forest Service road, Dahlonega Creek Road #079, from the west or Forest Service Roads #943 and #624 from Highway 43 from the east. The pass is not accessible to passenger vehicles in the winter.

On their return trip east in 1806, the Lewis and Clark Expedition separated at Traveler's Rest near modern-day Lolo. On July 3, Meriwether Lewis headed north to explore the Marias River, while William Clark headed up the Bitterroot River with fifty men, Sacagawea, and her baby. They crossed Big Hole Pass on their way to their cache of supplies at Camp Fortunate.

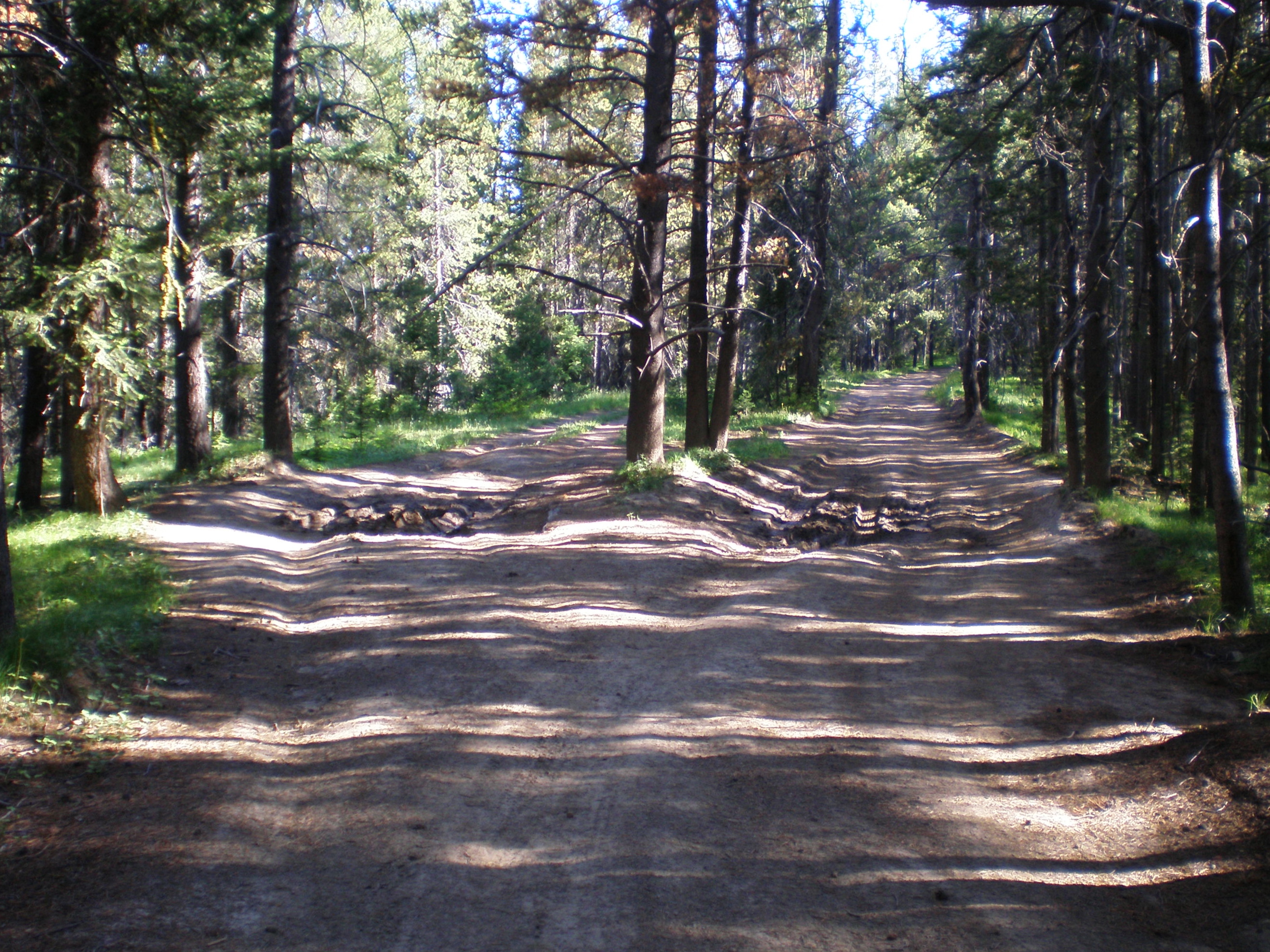
Woods Road near Big Hole Pass

== Recreation ==
This pass cannot be seen from a paved highway but is frequently traversed by through-hikers on the Continental Divide Trail (CDT). Hunters, fishermen and other outdoors people use the area. Within a mile of Big Hole Pass, a woods road sits on the actual Continental Divide. Water draining from the muddy road on the left goes toward the Pacific Ocean, while water on the right goes toward the Atlantic Ocean.

== See also ==
- Mountain passes in Montana
