= Gibbons Pass =

Mountain pass in Montana, United States

- Interactive map of Gibbons Pass
- Elevation: 2,117 m (6,946 ft)

Third Approach
- Location: Beaverhead / Ravalli counties, Montana, United States
- Range: Rocky Mountains
- Coordinates: 45°43.9′N 113°54.3′W

Gibbons Pass (el. 2117 m./6945 ft.) is a high mountain pass in the Rocky Mountains in Montana. It is situated on the North American Continental Divide. It was used by part of the Lewis and Clark Expedition on their return trip. Gibbons Pass is also one of the most historic passes in Montana. The conflict with the Nez Perce Indians by Captain Gibbons began here. The pass was the main route for Indians, explorers, hunters and other traffic prior to the construction of US Highway 93.

== See also ==
- Mountain passes in Montana

== Bibliography ==
- Saindon, Robert A. (2003). Explorations Into the World of Lewis and Clark, Volume 3.
  Digital Scanning Inc. p. 528. ISBN 9781582187655.
- Woodger, Elin; Toropov, Brandon (2009). Encyclopedia of the Lewis and Clark Expedition.
  Infobase Publishing. p. 438. ISBN 978-0-8160-4781-9. Url
- "Gibbon's Pass". cyclepass.com.
- USGS Geographic Names Information System
