= Hancock Pass =

Mountain pass in Colorado, USA

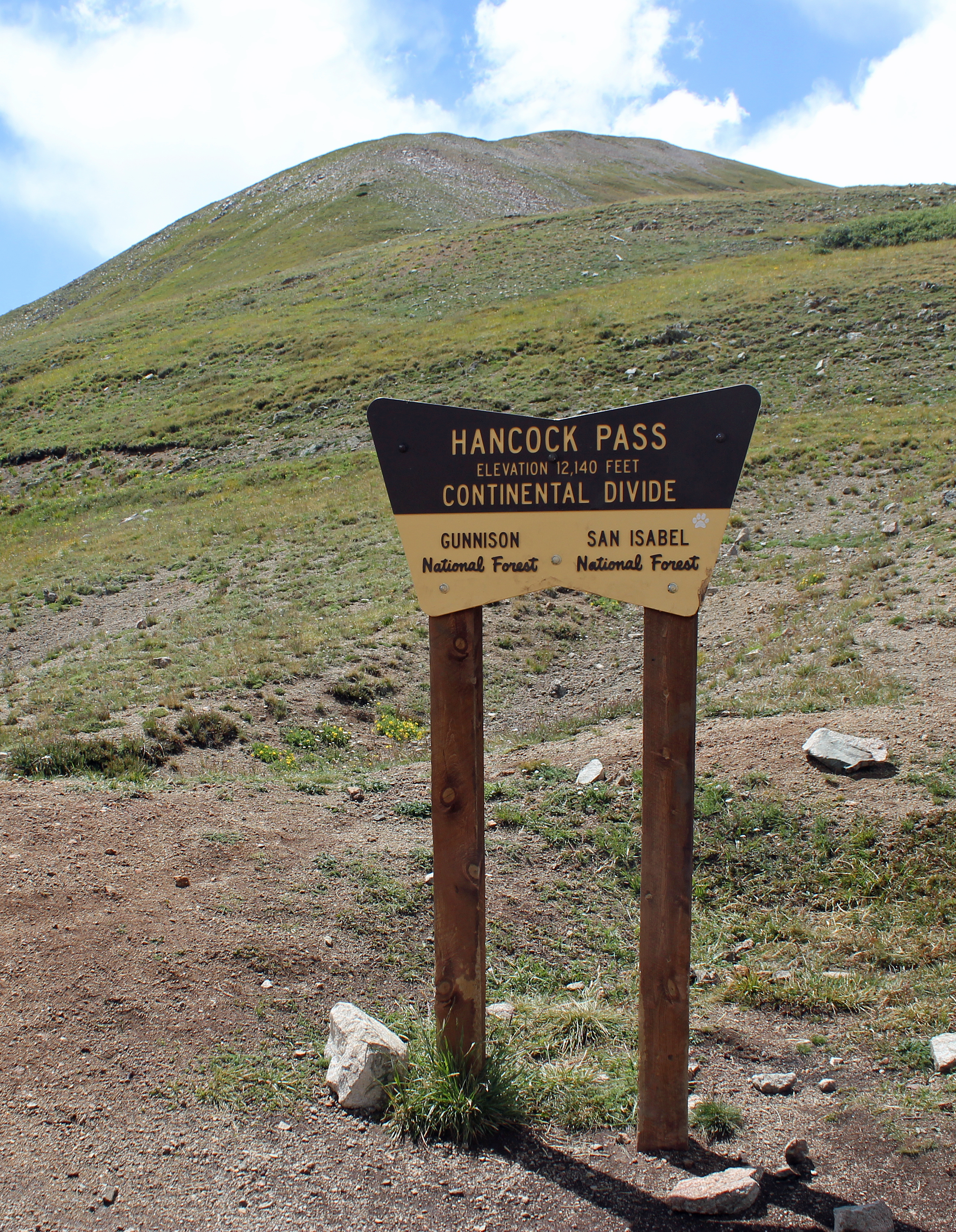
- The sign at the top of the pass.
- Interactive map of Hancock Pass
- Elevation: 12,208 feet (3,721 m)

Third Approach
- Location: Chaffee and Gunnison counties, Colorado.
- Range: Rocky Mountains
- Coordinates: 38°37′15″N 106°22′27″W
- Topo map: Garfield

Hancock Pass, elevation 12,208 ft (3,721 m), is a high mountain pass on the Continental Divide in western Colorado. The pass is on the border between Chaffee and Gunnison counties and between the Gunnison and San Isabel national forests.

The road over the pass is of moderate difficulty and is very rocky and slow going.
