= North Pass =

Mountain pass in Colorado, USA

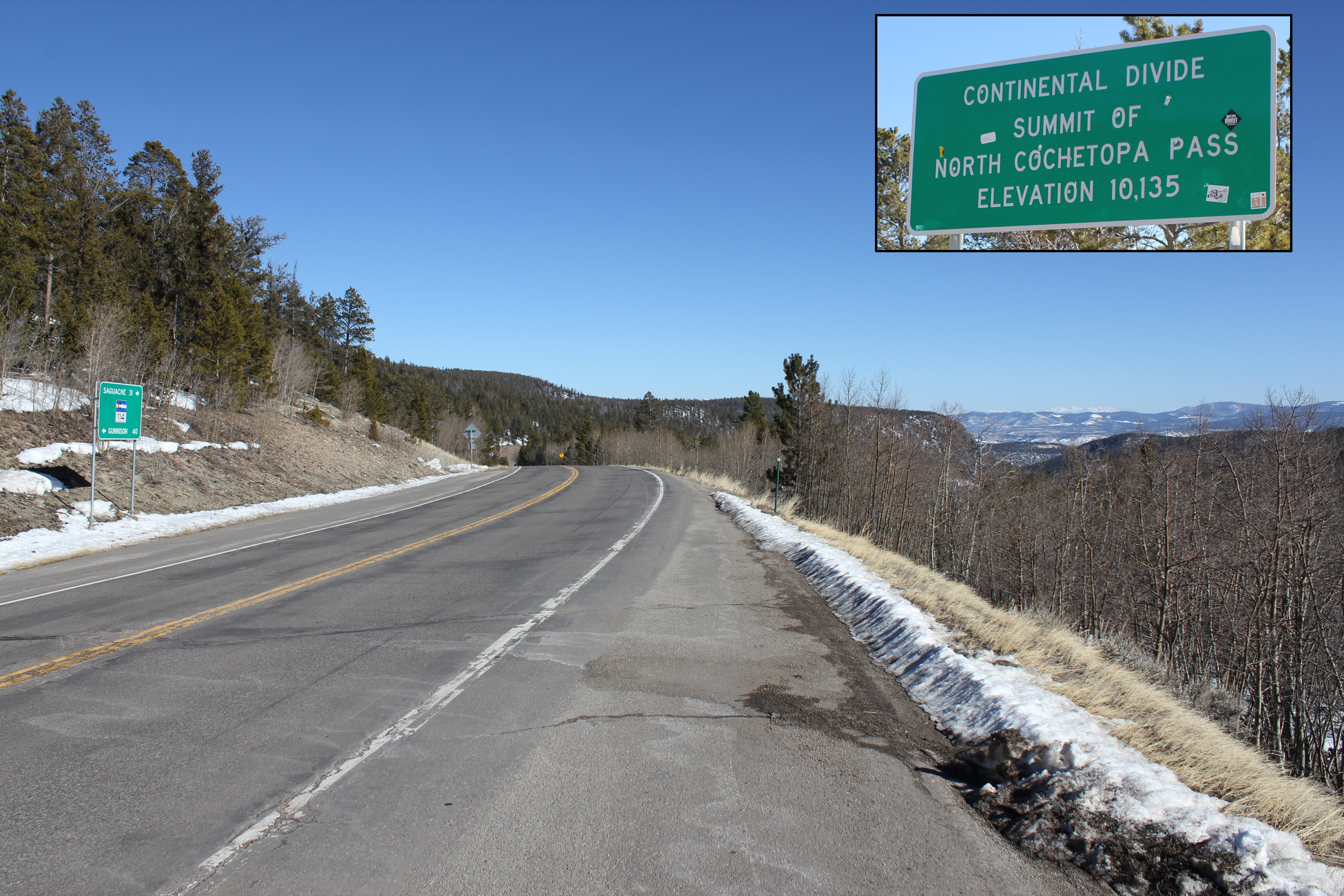
- Looking east from the top of the pass. The inset shows the sign on the south side of the pass.
- Interactive map of North Pass
- Elevation: 10,135 feet (3,089 m)
- Traversed by: State Highway 114

Third Approach
- Location: Saguache County, Colorado, U.S.
- Range: Cochetopa Hills
- Coordinates: 38°12′50″N 106°34′20″W
- Topo map: USGS North Pass

North Pass (elevation 10,135 ft (3,089 m)) is a mountain pass over the Continental Divide in Saguache County, Colorado. North Pass, is also known as North Cochetopa Pass. The pass is traversed by Colorado State Highway 114 between Saguache to the southeast and Gunnison to the northwest. The route is an all-weather paved road.

== History ==
Throughout the 1920’s, State Highway 114 was slowly built, originally traversing Cochetopa Pass(the area surrounding North pass).

There were trails through these hills long before Cochetopa Pass was constructed, but it was the first significant wagon road through this area. The history of Cochetopa Pass includes abortive expeditions, cannibalism, and invasions by native tribes.

By 1959, preparations for realigning Cochetopa Pass had started. Approximately three miles north of the old Cochetopa Pass road is where the new highway was constructed. North Pass would be the name of this new road.

In June 1959, a contract to complete grading of the new route was awarded. Work was scheduled to begin in June, and was expected to take 5 months.

With effect from January 1, 1963, the USGS named this highway as North Pass. The US Department of the Interior Board of Geographic Names gave the term "North Pass" approval for use on maps in 1964. In 1981, North Cochetopa Pass was acknowledged as an alternate name for this pass.

== Accessibility ==
North Pass is easily accessible to most passenger vehicles all year round, making it a convenient route for travelers. State Highway 114, which runs through the pass, is paved and well-maintained, ensuring a smooth drive.

=== Seasonal access ===
Though North Pass is typically open year-round, weather conditions can sometimes lead to temporary closures or restrictions, especially during heavy snowfalls in winter. The Colorado Department of Transportation (CDOT) works diligently to keep the route clear, but motorists should always check weather forecasts and road conditions before traveling. During winter storms, certain vehicle types may be required to have snow chains or tires with adequate traction, as mandated by state regulations.

=== Vehicle suitability ===
State Highway 114 has a paved surface and relatively gentle gradients compared to other mountain passes in Colorado. Nonetheless, in the event of severe winter conditions, drivers should ensure their vehicles meet safety requirements, such as carrying traction devices (chains or winter tires), particularly if a storm is forecasted.

== Recreation on North Pass ==
There are many opportunities to enjoy the Gunnison and Rio Grande national forests that surround North Pass. Visitors have a wide array of options for hiking, mountain biking, camping, or winter activities. Just south of the pass along SH 114, campers can camp temporarily on the Buffalo Pass Campground for a minute fee per night.

North Pass is crossed by Colorado Trail Segment 18 immediately north of the summit. This trail passes through this region in line with the Continental Divide Trail. The hiking on Segment 18 is mostly on back roads, over open alpine meadows, and through farmland. It is 13.6 miles long. Water is essential, as the streams along the route are contaminated due to farming. On this portion of the Colorado Trail, mountain biking is permitted.
