= Rogers Pass (Montana) =

Mountain pass in Montana, USA

- Location within Montana
- Elevation: 5,610 ft (1,710 m)
- Traversed by: MT 200

Third Approach
- Location: Lewis and Clark County, Montana, United States
- Range: Rocky Mountains
- Coordinates: 47°04′35″N 112°22′11″W
- Topo map: USGS Rogers Pass (MT)

Rogers Pass is a mountain pass that rises 5,610 feet (1,710 m) above sea level and is located on the Continental Divide in the U.S. state of Montana. The pass is adjacent to Helena National Forest and is traversed by Montana Highway 200, providing the shortest route between the cities of Great Falls and Missoula, Montana. It was the site of the coldest temperature ever recorded in the coterminous United States, on January 20, 1954.

Rogers Pass is more than 100 miles (160 km) south of Marias Pass, and there are no other roads that cross the Continental Divide between these two passes. The region between the two passes is mostly wilderness, and the majority of it has been set aside and protected from future development. The Great Bear, Scapegoat and Bob Marshall Wildernesses have been consolidated into the Bob Marshall Wilderness Complex and permanently protect 1,535,352 acres (6,213.35 km^{2}). The region is noted for its inaccessibility and as one of the last strongholds for the grizzly bear in the lower 48 states. The Scapegoat Wilderness is a 10-mile (16 km) hike north of Rogers Pass via the Continental Divide Trail.

== Origin of name ==
Rogers Pass in Montana was named by the Great Northern Railway for one of the line's locating surveyors, A.B. Rogers, who located the pass in 1887. Rogers has the distinction of having two passes named after him: this one in Montana and another Rogers Pass in British Columbia, Canada, approximately 373 miles (600 km) to the northwest. In 1881 and 1882, A.B. Rogers was a surveyor for the Canadian Pacific Railway (CPR), and he located Rogers Pass in British Columbia, which was then used by the CPR on its transcontinental line across Canada. The CPR named the pass after Rogers. James J. Hill, who controlled the Great Northern, then hired Rogers as a locating engineer on the latter, which built into Montana in 1887. Shortly after Rogers had located the pass in Montana that bears his name, his career ended when he was badly injured falling from his horse. Although Hill and the Great Northern eventually chose Marias Pass, 100 miles (160 km) to the north, as the route over the Continental Divide for their transcontinental railroad, Hill saw to it that Rogers Pass in Montana was named after the surveyor.

== Golden eagle migration route ==
The region is a noted location for observation of golden eagles and, to a lesser extent, bald eagles. In March and April, strong westerly winds help migrating flocks of eagles cross the Continental Divide so that they can spend the summer on the Great Plains. During these months, over 800 golden eagles and 129 bald eagles have been observed heading east. From mid-September through October, a similar migration occurs, but in the opposite direction. This is also a migration route used by other raptors such as northern goshawks, red-tailed hawks, and rough-legged hawks. Canada geese, tundra swans, and snow geese also use the pass during migration periods. The golden eagles and other birds can be observed from a distance as close as 100 to 500 feet (30 to 150 m).

== Climate ==
According to the Köppen climate classification system, Rogers Pass has a humid continental climate, abbreviated "Dfb" on climate maps. Summers tend to be warm to hot, with cooler nighttime temperatures, while winters are very snowy and cold, sometimes severely cold. Precipitation peaks during late spring and early summer.

=== Record-cold temperature ===
Rogers Pass is the location of the lowest temperature ever recorded in the contiguous United States. On January 20, 1954, a low temperature of −70 °F (−57 °C) was recorded during a severe cold wave. Only Alaska, Antarctica, Canada, Greenland, Kazakhstan, China and Russia have recorded lower temperatures. Since the establishment of the modern weather station in 1964, however, the temperature has not fallen below −46 °F (−43 °C).

Climate data for Rogers Pass, Montana, 1991–2020 normals, extremes 1964–2022
Month	Jan	Feb	Mar	Apr	May	Jun	Jul	Aug	Sep	Oct	Nov	Dec	Year
Record high °F (°C)	65 (18)	64 (18)	75 (24)	83 (28)	89 (32)	95 (35)	100 (38)	100 (38)	95 (35)	90 (32)	71 (22)	66 (19)	100 (38)
Mean maximum °F (°C)	54.0 (12.2)	54.5 (12.5)	62.8 (17.1)	73.1 (22.8)	81.3 (27.4)	86.3 (30.2)	93.6 (34.2)	93.8 (34.3)	87.7 (30.9)	77.1 (25.1)	62.5 (16.9)	52.8 (11.6)	95.4 (35.2)
Mean daily maximum °F (°C)	35.7 (2.1)	36.8 (2.7)	45.3 (7.4)	53.2 (11.8)	62.3 (16.8)	70.6 (21.4)	81.5 (27.5)	80.7 (27.1)	70.1 (21.2)	55.3 (12.9)	42.1 (5.6)	34.4 (1.3)	55.7 (13.2)
Daily mean °F (°C)	26.5 (−3.1)	26.5 (−3.1)	34.2 (1.2)	41.5 (5.3)	50.3 (10.2)	58.1 (14.5)	66.0 (18.9)	64.8 (18.2)	55.4 (13.0)	43.7 (6.5)	33.3 (0.7)	26.0 (−3.3)	43.9 (6.6)
Mean daily minimum °F (°C)	17.3 (−8.2)	16.2 (−8.8)	23.0 (−5.0)	29.9 (−1.2)	38.4 (3.6)	45.5 (7.5)	50.5 (10.3)	48.9 (9.4)	40.7 (4.8)	32.2 (0.1)	24.6 (−4.1)	17.5 (−8.1)	32.1 (0.0)
Mean minimum °F (°C)	−17.1 (−27.3)	−11.0 (−23.9)	−2.5 (−19.2)	11.2 (−11.6)	25.0 (−3.9)	33.9 (1.1)	39.6 (4.2)	36.2 (2.3)	26.3 (−3.2)	11.8 (−11.2)	−3.4 (−19.7)	−13.5 (−25.3)	−27.2 (−32.9)
Record low °F (°C)	−70 (−57)	−39 (−39)	−40 (−40)	−12 (−24)	0 (−18)	23 (−5)	30 (−1)	28 (−2)	6 (−14)	−13 (−25)	−34 (−37)	−40 (−40)	−70 (−57)
Average precipitation inches (mm)	0.64 (16)	0.75 (19)	0.88 (22)	1.77 (45)	2.99 (76)	3.06 (78)	1.23 (31)	1.24 (31)	1.65 (42)	1.37 (35)	0.75 (19)	0.76 (19)	17.09 (433)
Average snowfall inches (cm)	12.0 (30)	14.9 (38)	16.1 (41)	10.7 (27)	4.4 (11)	trace	0.0 (0.0)	trace	3.1 (7.9)	5.1 (13)	7.7 (20)	11.0 (28)	85 (215.9)
Average precipitation days (≥ 0.01 in)	6.8	7.6	7.2	8.7	9.9	9.8	6.3	6.6	6.0	7.0	6.0	6.5	88.4
Average snowy days (≥ 0.1 in)	3.8	3.9	3.2	1.8	0.7	0.1	0.0	0.0	0.5	1.2	2.4	3.4	21
Source 1: NOAA (snow/snow days 1981–2010)
Source 2: National Weather Service

== See also ==
- List of mountain passes in Montana
- List of weather records
- A.B. Rogers
- Lewis and Clark Pass (Montana)
- Rogers Pass (British Columbia)
