= Buchanan Pass =

Mountain pass in Colorado, USA

- Interactive map of Buchanan Pass
- Elevation: 11,844 ft (3,610 m)
- Traversed by: Foot trail

Third Approach
- Location: Boulder / Grand counties, Colorado, U.S.
- Range: Front Range
- Coordinates: 40°07′52″N 105°37′49″W
- Topo map: USGS Isolation Peak

Buchanan Pass, elevation 11,844 ft (3,610 m), is a mountain pass located in the Rocky Mountains of north-central Colorado in the United States. The pass is toward the northern end of the Indian Peaks of the Front Range on the Grand-Boulder county line, between the Buchanan Creek drainage to the west and the Middle St. Vrain Creek drainage to the east. It is traversed by the Buchanan Pass Trail which travels from its junction with the Cascade Creek Trail on the west to the Camp Dick campground on the east, close to Peaceful Valley. The pass is in the Indian Peaks Wilderness of the Arapaho and Roosevelt National Forests and is the easternmost mountain pass on the continental divide.

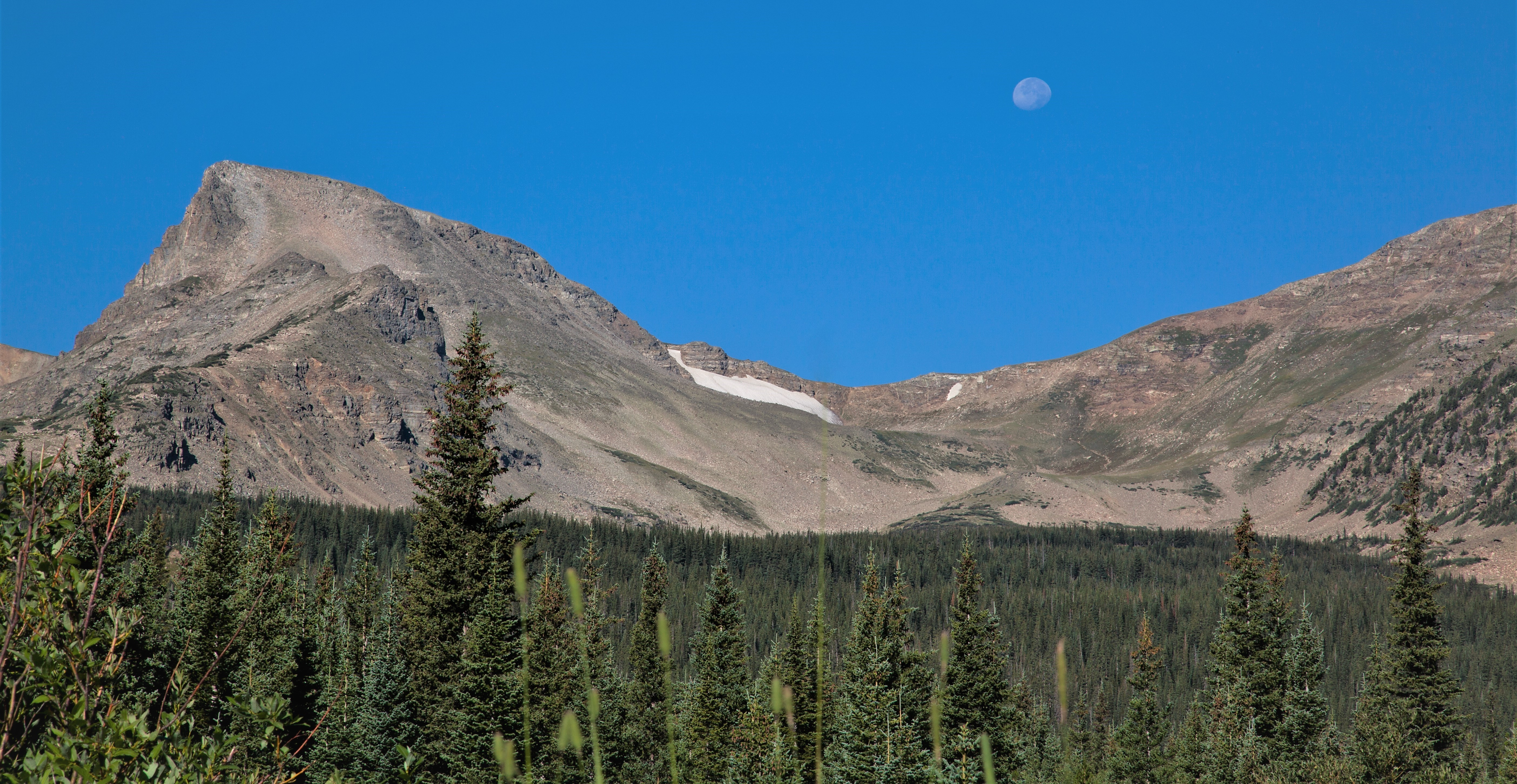
Buchanan Pass centered with Sawtooth Mountain to left
