= List of mountain passes in Wyoming =

Mountain passes in Wyoming are listed in the following articles:

- List of mountain passes in Wyoming (A–J)
- List of mountain passes in Wyoming (K–Y)
