= Lewis and Clark Pass =

Mountain pass in Montana, United States

- Interactive map of Lewis and Clark Pass
- Elevation: 6,424 feet (1,958 m)
- Traversed by: Lewis and Clark National Historic Trail

Third Approach
- Location: Helena National Forest, Lewis and Clark County, Montana
- Range: Lewis and Clark Range
- Coordinates: 47°08′34″N 112°25′44″W

Lewis and Clark Pass is a mountain pass on the continental divide in Montana, United States, at an elevation of 6,424 feet (1,958 m) above sea level. The pass lies at the head of the drainages of the west-flowing Blackfoot River and the east-flowing Dearborn River, in the Helena National Forest in Lewis and Clark County. The Continental Divide Trail traverses north and south through the pass.

In the early 19th century, the pass was a heavily-used pathway where native peoples crossed over the continental divide. The pass was crossed by Meriwether Lewis with a party of nine men and his dog Seaman on July 7, 1806, on the return leg of the Lewis and Clark Expedition. The pass is named for the expedition's two leaders, Lewis and William Clark.

Lewis and Clark Pass is the only roadless mountain pass on the entire Lewis and Clark National Historic Trail. It has gone from being one of the most used continental divide passes prior to the pioneer era to one of the least visited passes today. It can be accessed by a 1.5-mile (2.4 km) trail. Modern visitors encounter the pass much as Lewis did in 1806. The furrows left by the countless dog and horse travois that crossed the pass are still visible (though fading), and it is one of the few places along the expedition's route where visitors may still encounter a grizzly bear. On a clear day, visitors to the pass can see Square Butte in Cascade County, Montana, 40 miles (64 km) to the northeast.

== Ancient Indian pathway ==
The pass over the continental divide, now known as Lewis and Clark Pass, was part of a much used "road" for Native American people, since it was easily traversible and, most critically, the route traversing Lewis and Clark pass and also Lolo Pass farther west, was the shortest and easiest route between the plains of eastern Montana and the Columbia River Valley. The Nez Perce guides for Meriwether Lewis in 1806 referred to the pathway over the pass as the "Buffalo Road" or the "Cokahlarishkit" trail. Tribes living in the mountain valleys west of the continental divide used the pass as a shortcut to move out of the mountains and onto the broadreaching eastern Montana plains to hunt and harvest buffalo. However, the pass was also used by war parties from the nomadic people living on the plains of Eastern Montana to conduct raids on western Montana tribes living in the inter-mountain valleys. The pass was described as a broad and "well beaten" trail when Meriwether Lewis traversed it in 1806.

Lewis and Clark Pass is not the lowest pass in the area. Rogers Pass, 5.3 miles (8.5 km) to the southwest crosses the continental divide at an elevation 800 feet (240 m) lower, and is part of Montana Highway 200. However Lewis and Clark is the pass with the easiest approaches to the summit over which Native people could travel, using dog and later horse travois.

Before the time of Lewis and Clark, the pass was probably one of the busiest and most used passes in the northern Rocky Mountains. Ironically, today it is the least used pass on the Lewis and Clark Expedition route, since all other passes are traversed by roads fit for vehicles.

== Lewis and Clark and the pass ==
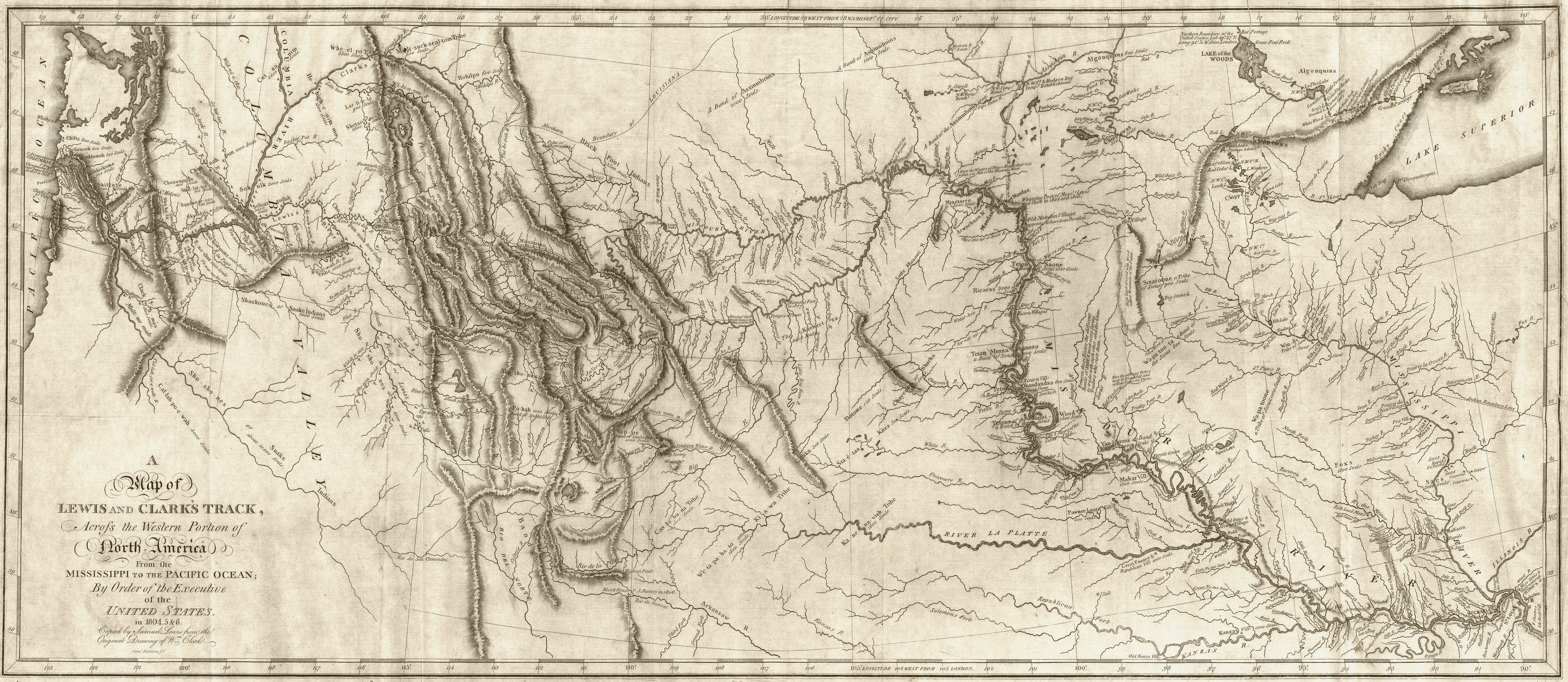
Map plotted and drafted by Lewis and Clark Expedition

On the westward leg of their expedition to the Pacific Ocean in 1805, Lewis and Clark were unaware of the pass, but by the time of their return they had learned of it from local tribal people and were determined to travel over it. On July 1, 1806, at Traveler's Rest on Lolo Creek in the Bitterroot Valley, Lewis and Clark split into two separate parties. Lewis was to go directly east, using the pass to take a shortcut out of the mountains to the eastern Montana plains. He then planned to veer north to explore the upper Marias River Country before returning to the Missouri River and descending it to where it was joined by the Yellowstone. Clark would cross over from the Bitterroot to the Big Hole River and then follow the Big Hole and the Jefferson River down to the Three Forks of the Missouri. Here Clark planned to turn east up the East Gallatin River until he could cross over to the Yellowstone River, which he would then follow down to the Missouri where he intended to find Lewis.

On July 3, 1806, Lewis left Traveler's Rest with nine men and his dog Seaman. His route to the pass lay through the Hellgate area, where Missoula is now located, and up the Clark's Fork of the Columbia. He then turned and followed the Blackfoot drainage to the pass over continental divide. After crossing the pass he then went down the Dearborn River to the Missouri, and then out onto the plains where the buffalo roamed.

On July 7, 1806, late in the day, Lewis and his small party came to the top of the divide between the Blackfoot River and the Dearborn. Lewis described it as "the dividing ridge between the waters of the Columbia and Missouri rivers". Lewis said little about the area other than that he could see in the far distance, on the skyline of the eastern Montana plains, the landmark now called Square Butte which the Corps had dubbed "Fort Mountain" the previous July. Square Butte can still be seen from the pass on a clear day at a viewing distance of about 40 air miles.

The goal of the Lewis and Clark Expedition was to find the shortest pathway from the Missouri River drainage to the Columbia River drainage. After crossing Lewis and Clark Pass, Lewis confirmed that the route that went over Lewis and Clark Pass, and then over Lolo Pass farther west, was the most direct route from the Missouri River to the Columbia River Valley.

== The only roadless pass on the Lewis and Clark Trail ==
Lewis and Clark pass is an exception to the rule that highways follow old Indian pathways. No highway or road crosses this pass today. It is the only pass that Lewis and Clark used that was not later traversed by a road. While the approaches to Lewis and Clark Pass are much easier to traverse from the Blackfoot drainage to the Dearborn drainage, Rogers Pass located 5.3 miles (8.5 km) to the southwest was more than 800 feet (244 m) lower than Lewis and Clark Pass, and modern highway construction and engineering methods favored Rogers Pass over Lewis and Clark Pass for highway construction. Therefore, Rogers Pass is traversed by Montana Highway 200, connecting the cities of Great Falls and Missoula, Montana.

== Visiting the pass ==
A road carries the visitor within 1.5 miles of the pass on the west side. Thereafter the visitor must follow the example of earlier Native Americans and travel on foot or horseback to the pass. The extensive use of the Lewis and Clark pass by Native people using dog and horse travois is evidenced by the furrows from travois that are fading but which can still be made out at the crest of the pass and at several places along the approach pathways.

Of all places along the Lewis and Clark Trail, this is the only pass that is roadless, and it is the only area on the Lewis and Clark National Historic Trail where it is possible to encounter grizzly bears. On a clear day there are extensive views out over the eastern plains of Montana. Like Meriwether Lewis, one can see Square Butte 40 miles away on the skyline.

== Location ==
The town of Lincoln is located 58 miles northwest of Helena, Montana, on Highway 200 and is a full service community. Lewis and Clark Pass is located 9 miles east of Lincoln off Highway 200. Turn north onto Alice Creek Rd (FS Road 293) and drive 11 miles to the trailhead. An uphill 1.5 mile hike reaches the summit of the pass.

== See also ==
- Mountain passes in Montana
- Helena National Forest
- Timeline of the Lewis and Clark Expedition
