= Cadotte Pass =

Mountain pass in Montana, United States

- Interactive map of Cadotte Pass
- Elevation: 6,073 ft (1,851 m)

Third Approach
- Location: Lewis and Clark County, Montana, United States
- Range: Rocky Mountains
- Coordinates: 47°05′58″N 112°23′37″W
- Topo map: USGS Cadotte Pass (MT)

Cadotte Pass, known in the mid to late 1800s as Cadotte's Pass, is a pass in the Rocky Mountains located on the Continental Divide in the U.S. state of Montana. Pierre Cadotte, a white settler at Fort Benton, Montana, explored the pass in 1851. Prior to his exploration Tribal people utilized the pass while migrating to the buffalo hunting plains around the Sun River. Isaac Stevens, Governor of Washington Territory, named the pass after Cadotte in 1853. The pass is 6,073 feet (1,851 m) above sea level.

== See also ==
- List of mountain passes in Montana
