= Kakwa Pass =

Mountain pass in British Columbia, Canada

- Location within British Columbia
- Elevation: 1,570 metres (5,150 ft)

Third Approach
- Location: British Columbia, Canada
- Range: Canadian Rockies
- Coordinates: 53°58′00″N 120°09′00″W
- Topo map: NTS 93H16 Mount Sir Alexander

Kakwa Pass, 1,570 metres (5,151 ft), is a mountain pass in the Canadian Rockies. It is located in the province of British Columbia on the Continental Divide. It is located just east of McGregor Pass and to the north of the town of McBride.

It is the prominence col for Wishaw Mountain, which has 1063 m prominence and is located just south.

== See also ==
- Kakwa Provincial Park
- Kakwa River
- South Kakwa Pass
- List of mountain passes
