= Cochetopa Pass =

Mountain pass in Colorado, USA

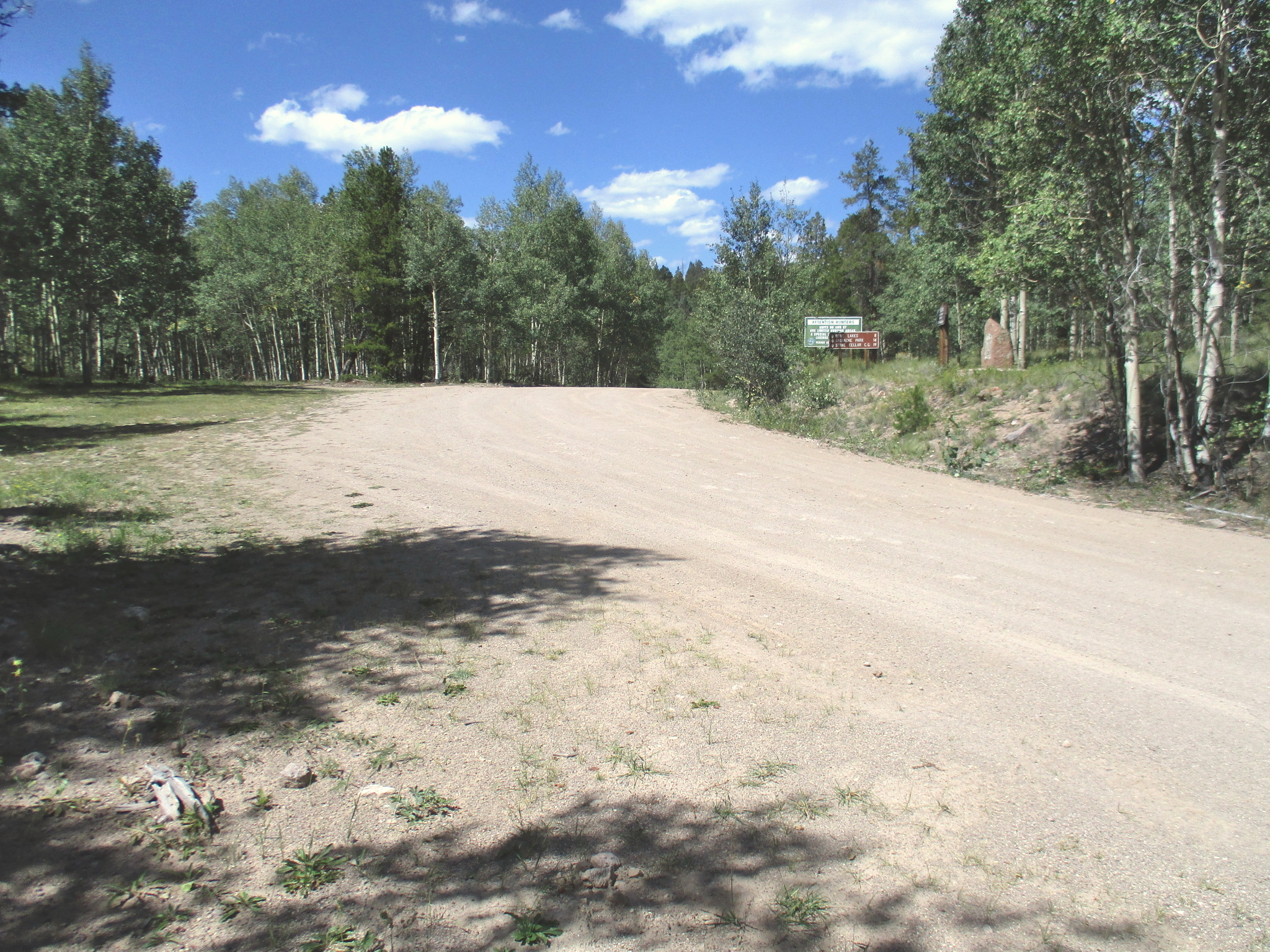
- Cochetopa Pass
- Interactive map of Cochetopa Pass
- Elevation: 10,067 ft (3,068 m)
- Traversed by: CR NN14 / FR 750

Third Approach
- Location: Saguache County, Colorado, United States
- Range: Rocky Mountains
- Coordinates: 38.1629°N 106.5998°W
- Topo map: USGS North Pass

Cochetopa Pass (Note: Pronounced /koʊtʃɪˈtoʊpə/ or sometimes locally /koʊtʃɪˈtoʊp/.) is a mountain pass in the Rocky Mountains of south-central Colorado. It lies on the Continental Divide between the city of Gunnison to the northwest and the town of Saguache to the southeast. It also lies on the boundary between the Gunnison and Rio Grande National Forests. Its name is taken from the Cochetopa Hills that it lies within, Cochetopa being the Ute Indian word for "pass of the buffalo". The original pass is traversed by Saguache County Road NN14, a maintained gravel road. Another crossing, sometimes called North Cochetopa Pass and more often simply North Pass, is located nearby on State Highway 114, which is paved and reaches a slightly higher elevation.

== History ==
The area of the Cochetopa Hills was a hunting ground of the Ute Indians. The area of the pass would be explored by many men in search of a route over and through the Rocky Mountains. Many expeditions would end in disaster.

=== 1848 ===
In 1848, St. Louis businessmen, in an effort to have the transcontinental railroad pass through their city, financed an expedition to find a route over Cochetopa Pass. The explorers set out with John Charles Fremont leading them. The expedition crossed over the San Juan Mountains at Bill Williams Pass, but soon after reaching Pool Table Mesa in mid-December, the men and mules began freezing to death. After one rescue party failed to reach help and began resorting to cannibalism, Fremont, with the help of the Ute Indians, led the men out to Taos, New Mexico. Fremont left the men behind in Taos and ran for California. It took until January to rescue the remainder of the party from the mountains. All told, the expedition was a failure and took the lives of 10 men.

=== 1853 ===
In the fall of 1853, Captain John W. Gunnison also explored and surveyed the area in search of a route for the transcontinental railroad. Not long after exploring the area, Captain Gunnison was killed by Indians, and his second in command, Lt. Edward G. Beckwith, took over and decided that the best route for the railroad would be further north through Wyoming across the Great Divide Basin.
