= Colorado State Highway 114 =

State highway in Colorado, United States

State Highway 114
- Map of south central Colorado with SH 114 highlighted in red

Route information
- Maintained by CDOT
- Length: 61.7 mi (99.3 km)

Major junctions
- West end: US 50 east of Gunnison
- East end: US 285 in Saguache

Location
- Country: United States
- State: Colorado
- Counties: Gunnison, Saguache

Highway system
- Colorado State Highway System; Interstate; US; State; Scenic
← SH 113	→ SH 115

State Highway 114 (SH 114) is a 61.7 mi (99.3 km) long state highway in southern central Colorado. SH 114's western terminus is at U.S. Route 50 (US 50) east of Gunnison, and the eastern terminus is at US 285 in Saguache.

== Route description ==
SH 114 begins in the west at its junction with US 50 approximately eight miles east of Gunnison. From there the route initially proceeds southward for more than twenty miles (32 km) before turning more nearly eastward and entering Gunnison National Forest and climbing up to cross the Continental Divide at North Pass at an elevation of 10,149 ft (3,093 m). At North Pass the road crosses into Rio Grande National Forest through which it passes generally eastward for roughly four and a half miles before leaving National Forest Service land and continuing for a further twenty-six miles before reaching Saguache at the northern edge of the San Luis Valley. There the road finds its eastern terminus at US 285.

== History ==
The route was defined in the 1920s, using a routing over Cochetopa Pass. By 1954, the route was paved for about 12 miles (19 km) and was paved for another 8 miles (13 km) two years later. In 1963, the section over Cochetopa Pass was deleted and North Pass was used instead, paved by 1964.

== Major intersections ==
County	Location	mi	km	Destinations	Notes
Gunnison		0.000	0.000	US 50 – Gunnison, Salida	Western terminus
Saguache	Saguache	61.697	99.292	US 285 – Monte Vista, Salida	Eastern terminus
1.000 mi = 1.609 km; 1.000 km = 0.621 mi

== Gallery ==
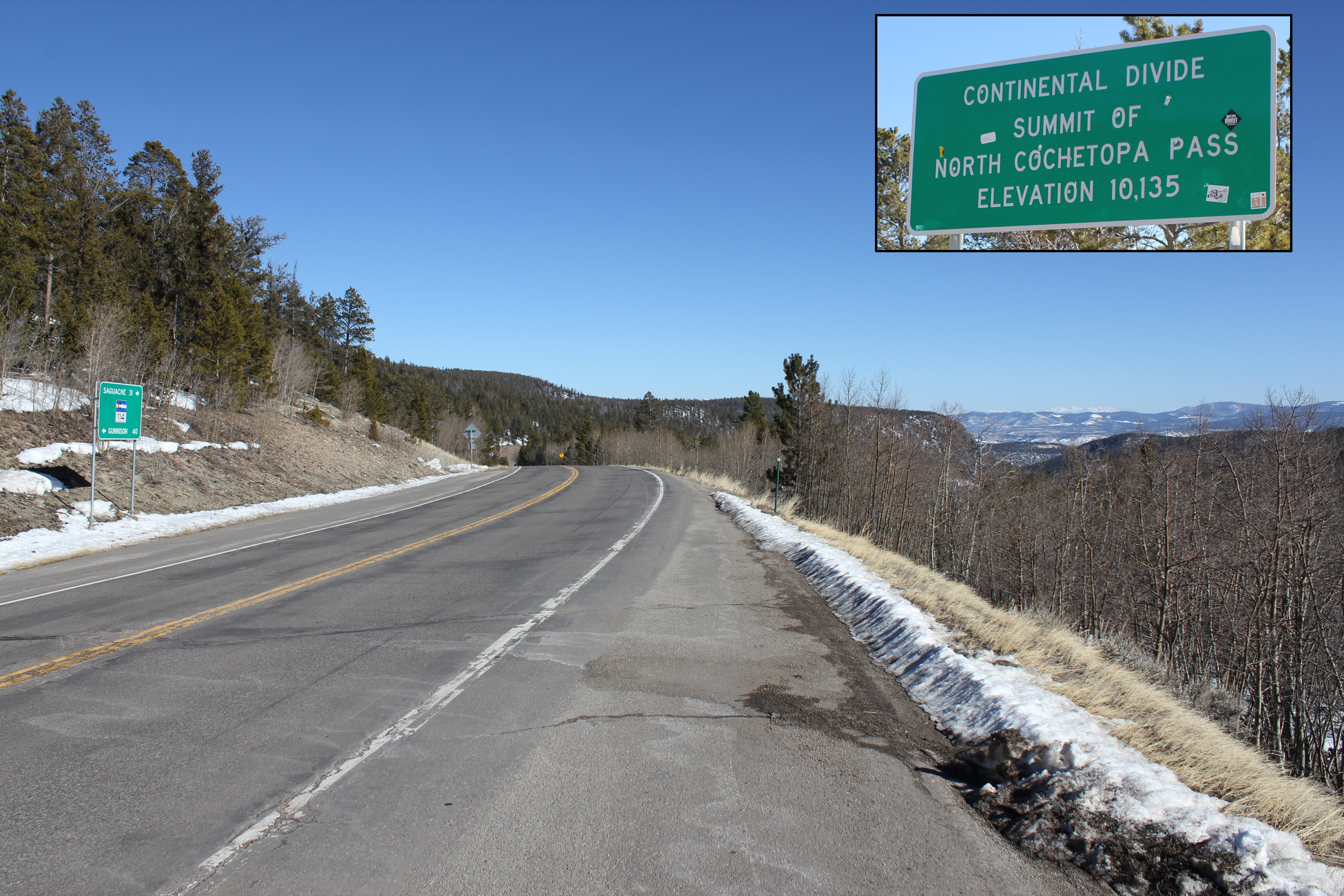
North Pass on Highway 114.

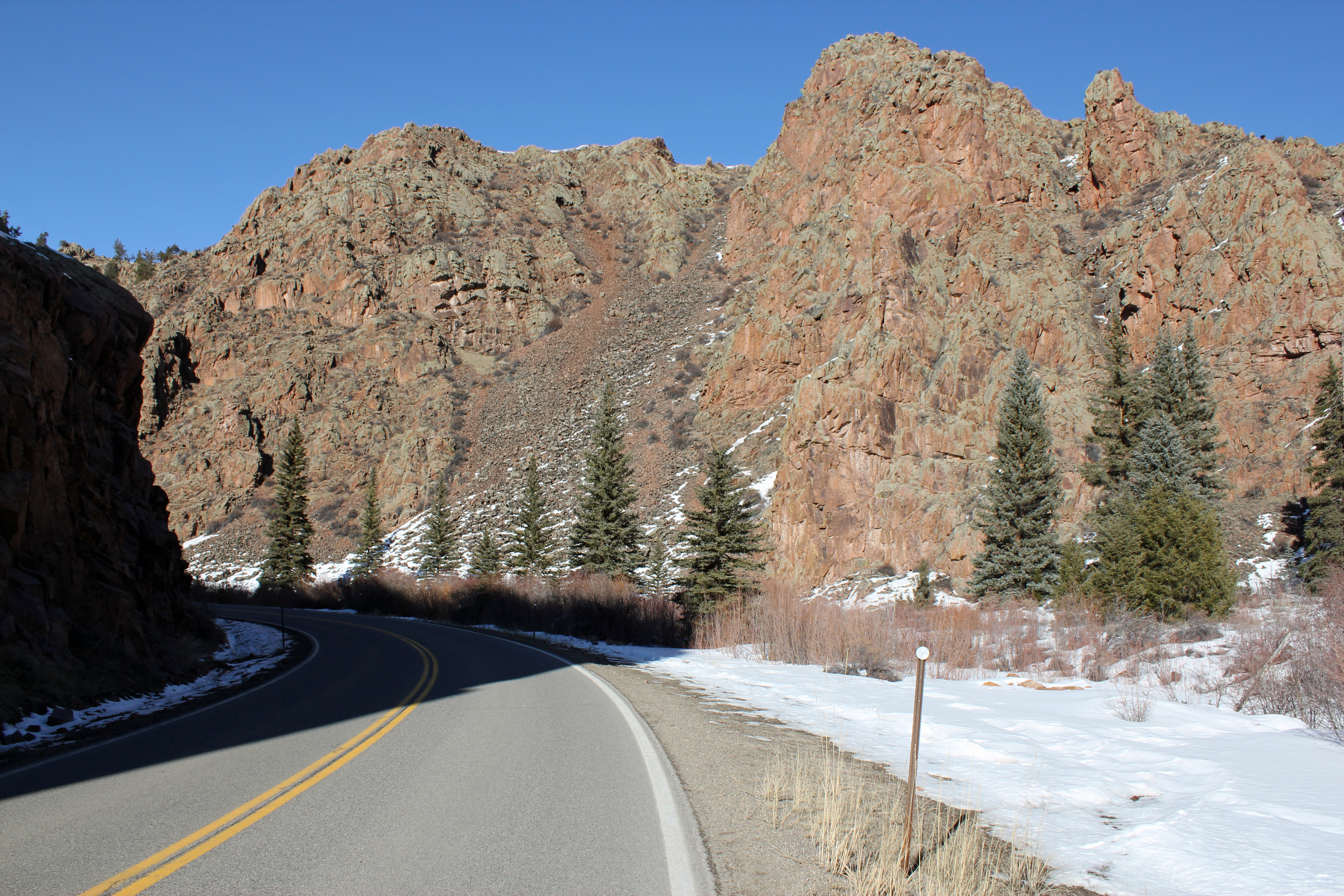
A section of Highway 114 in Gunnison County.

== See also ==
- List of state highways in Colorado
