= McGregor Pass =

Mountain pass in British Columbia, Canada

- Location within British Columbia
- Elevation: 1,555 m (5,102 ft)

Third Approach
- Location: British Columbia, Canada
- Range: Canadian Rockies
- Coordinates: 53°58′00″N 120°13′00″W
- Topo map: NTS 93H16 Mount Sir Alexander

McGregor Pass, 1,555 metres (5,102 ft), is a mountain pass located on the Continental Divide in the Canadian Rockies and near the head of the McGregor River, to the north of Wishaw Mountain and to the west of Kakwa Pass, which is in the same vicinity. McGregor Pass forms the division between the Hart Ranges of the Rockies, which begin at Mount Sir Alexander just to the northwest and extend to the Peace Reach of Lake Williston, and the Continental Ranges, the largest and most well-known segment of the Canadian Rockies, which extend to Marias Pass, at the head of the North Fork Flathead River in Montana, United States.

McGregor Pass is the prominence col for Mount Buchanan, giving it 1,181 metres (3,875 ft) of prominence.

== See also ==
- McGregor Plateau
- List of mountain passes
