= Elk Pass (Canada) =

Mountain pass in Alberta/British Columbia, Canada

- Location within Alberta Location within British Columbia
- Elevation: 1,905 m (6,250 ft)
- Traversed by: Trans Canada Trail (proposed)

Third Approach
- Location: Alberta–British Columbia border, Canada
- Range: Canadian Rockies
- Coordinates: 50°35′10″N 115°04′27″W
- Topo map: NTS 82J11 Kananaskis Lakes

Elk Pass (el. 1,905 m or 6,250 ft) is a high mountain pass in the Canadian Rockies, traversing the continental divide. It connects the Elk Valley in the province of British Columbia with the Kananaskis Valley in Alberta.

The pass is unusual by its 4 km (2.5 mi) width, as the two valleys were created from a single glaciated trench. The 1916 Alberta/British Columbia Provincial Boundary Surveyors subdivided it into two routes labeled as "West Passage" and "East Passage." These would later be gazetteered as West Elk Pass and East Elk Pass.

Elk Pass is inaccessible to conventional road traffic. On the Albertan side it reaches into Peter Lougheed Provincial Park, while on the British Columbian side it is slightly east of Elk Lakes Provincial Park.

The Trans Canada Trail has hoped to designate preexisting hiking trails through the Elk Pass as its continental divide-crossing section, but has come into conflict with coal mines in the Upper Elk Valley over the impacts such a routing would have on their ability to expand their mine sites. In the past, residents of Elkford, British Columbia had proposed extending British Columbia Highway 43 over the pass and into Alberta, creating a new all-weather route from B.C. to Calgary, but in light of enhanced environmental protection on the Albertan side, the project is no longer considered likely.
