= Deer Lodge Pass =

Mountain pass in Montana

- Interactive map of Deer Lodge Pass
- Elevation: 5,879 feet (1,792 m)
- Traversed by: Interstate 15, Union Pacific Railroad (nearby)

Third Approach
- Location: Silver Bow County, Montana, US
- Range: Rocky Mountains
- Coordinates: 45°52′58″N 112°40′21″W
- Topo map: USGS Buxton

Deer Lodge Pass, elevation 5,879 ft (1,792 m), is a mountain pass on the Continental Divide in southwestern Montana, about 11 miles southwest of Butte. It is traversed by Interstate 15 and is one of three crossings of the Divide by I-15 (all in Montana), the others being Monida Pass (on the border with Idaho) and Elk Park Pass north of Butte. Unlike most other passes in western Montana, Deer Lodge Pass is in the midst of treeless, rolling hills (reminiscent of Interstate 80 in Wyoming), and the grades on the highway are relatively gentle.

About 0.7 miles (1.1 km) west of the highway crossing is a slightly lower pass, elevation 5,801 ft (1,768 m), that carries a branch line of the Union Pacific Railroad across the Divide. This is sometimes also referred to as Deer Lodge Pass, but the official railroad name for this location is Feely. The railroad line connects Silver Bow, Montana with Idaho Falls, Idaho and is a remnant of the Utah and Northern Railway, completed over the pass in 1881 and converted to standard gauge five years later.
