= Chief Joseph Pass =

Mountain pass in Idaho and Montana, United States

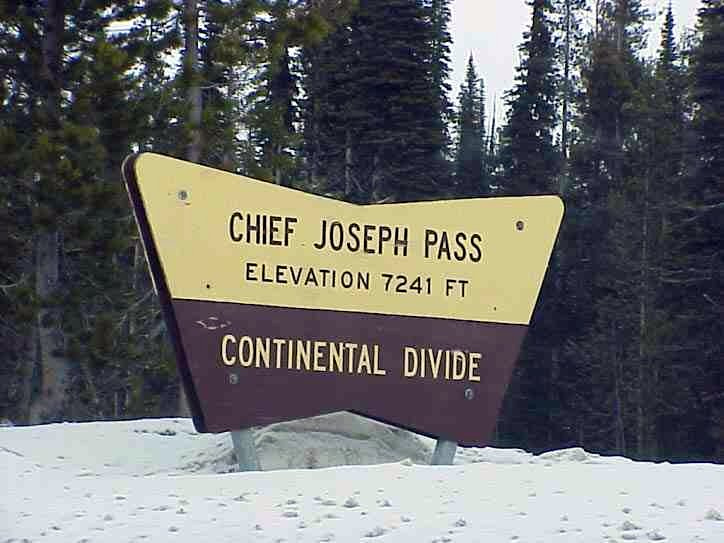
- US Forest Service sign at Chief Joseph Pass

- Location within the United States Location within Idaho
- Elevation: 7,251 ft (2,210 m)
- Traversed by: MT 43

Third Approach
- Location: Lemhi County, Idaho / Beaverhead County, Montana, U.S.
- Range: Bitterroot Mountains, Bitterroot Range, Rocky Mountains
- Coordinates: 45°41′05″N 113°55′59″W

Chief Joseph Pass (elev. 7,251 feet (2,210 m)) is a mountain pass on the continental divide of the Rocky Mountains in the northwestern United States joining Lemhi County, Idaho, and Beaverhead County, Montana. The pass is in the Bitterroot Mountains and is traversed by Montana Highway 43; it is named after Chief Joseph of the Wallowa band of the Nez Perce tribe, who traversed the pass in the summer of 1877 during the Nez Perce War, prior to the Battle of the Big Hole to the east.

West of the pass, the highway connects with US-93 at Lost Trail Pass, about a half-mile (0.8 km) west of the divide. Between the passes, the Montana highway is actually in Idaho, for about one mile (1.6 km).

This is the northernmost pass on the continental divide between Idaho and Montana. Less than a mile north, the divide heads eastward into Montana, following the Ravalli–Beaverhead county line towards Butte, then north to Glacier National Park. East of Chief Joseph Pass, Highway 43 descends to the town of Wisdom, 26 miles (42 km) east, passing the historic Big Hole National Battlefield.

In early September 1805, the westbound Lewis and Clark Expedition crossed either this pass or the nearby Lost Trail Pass (from the Idaho side) as they descended northward into the Bitterroot Valley of what is now Ravalli County, and later crossed Lolo Pass back into Idaho.

With lifts and runs in two states, the Lost Trail Powder Mountain ski area is about one mile (1.6 km) west, at Lost Trail Pass on US-93.

== See also ==
- Mountain passes in Montana
