= Elk Park Pass =

Mountain pass in Montana, United States

- Interactive map of Elk Park Pass
- Elevation: 6,352 feet (1,936 m)
- Traversed by: Interstate 15

Third Approach
- Location: Silver Bow/Jefferson counties, Montana, US
- Range: Rocky Mountains
- Coordinates: 46°02′11″N 112°27′33″W
- Topo map: USGS Elk Park Pass

Elk Park Pass, elevation 6,352 ft (1,936 m), is a mountain pass on the Continental Divide in southwestern Montana, about 4 miles (6.4 km) northeast of Butte. It is traversed by Interstate 15 and is one of three crossings of the Divide by the Interstate (all in Montana), the others being Monida Pass (on the border with Idaho) and Deer Lodge Pass southwest of Butte. Elk Park Pass lies on the border between Silver Bow and Jefferson counties and is remarkable for its highly asymmetrical nature. The approach from the north is through namesake Elk Park, a high, mostly treeless plain (like South Park in Colorado or the Sierra Valley in California), and the grade is almost imperceptible. The elevation at the northeast end of the park, about 10 miles (16 km) from the pass, is about 6,200 ft (1,900 m), only 152 ft (46 m) lower than the pass itself. However, at the south end, the highway drops 750 ft (230 m) from the pass into Butte over a distance of only about 4 miles (6.4 km).

At one time Elk Park Pass was also traversed by a railroad line, constructed by the Great Northern Railway and later operated by its successor, Burlington Northern. However, this line was abandoned in 1972.
