= Odell =

Odell may refer to:

== Places ==
=== United States ===
- Odell, Arkansas, an unincorporated community
- Odell Township, Livingston County, Illinois
- Odell, Illinois, a village
- Odell, Indiana, an unincorporated community
- Odell, Nebraska, a village
- Odell, New Hampshire, a township
- Odell Hill, New York, a summit
- Odell, Oregon, an unincorporated community and census-designated place
- Odell Lake (Oregon)
- Odell, Texas, an unincorporated community

=== Elsewhere ===
- Odell, Bedfordshire, England, a village and civil parish
- 25234 Odell, an asteroid

== Businesses ==
- Odell Brewing Company, an independent craft brewery in Fort Collins, Colorado
- Odell's, a supplier of popcorn toppings headquartered in Reno, Nevada

== People ==
- Odell (surname)
- Odell (given name)

== See also ==
- Odell Town, West Virginia, an unincorporated community
- Odell Building, Morrison, Illinois, on the National Register of Historic Places
- Odell House, Hartsdale, New York, on the National Register of Historic Places
- Odel, metal company
- O'Dell (disambiguation)
