= O'Dell (disambiguation) =

O'Dell is a surname.

O'Dell may also refer to:

- O'Dell, British Columbia, railway point on the British Columbia Railway in Canada
- O'dell Owens (1947–2022), American physician, public health official, and educator

== See also ==
- Odell (disambiguation)
- Dell (disambiguation)
