= Edwin Harrison McHenry =

American civil engineer (1859–1931)

- Born: January 25, 1859; Cincinnati, Ohio, US
- Died: August 21, 1931 (aged 72); Ardmore, Pennsylvania, US
- Education: Pennsylvania Military College
- Occupations: civil engineer, railroad official
- Employer(s): Northern Pacific Railway, Canadian Pacific Railway, New York, New Haven and Hartford Railroad
- Known for: civil engineering railroad official
- Title: chief engineer, receiver, vice-president
- Predecessor: John William Kendrick
- Successor: William Lafayette Darling

Edwin Harrison McHenry (January 25, 1859 – August 21, 1931) was the fourth vice-president of the New York, New Haven and Hartford Railroad and first vice-president of the Consolidated Railway of Hartford, Connecticut. Prior to joining the New Haven, McHenry had been chief engineer and a receiver of the Northern Pacific Railway and later the chief engineer of the Canadian Pacific Railway.

== Biography ==
He was born in Cincinnati, Ohio, on January 25, 1859. He attended the Pennsylvania Military College at Chester, Pennsylvania.

He first started working on the railroad in 1883 as a rodman doing surveying on the Black Hills branch of the Northern Pacific Railroad. He progressed from rodman to chainman, draftsman, leveler, transitman, assistant engineer, division engineer, principal assistant engineer, and from November 1, 1893, to January 1, 1896, he was the chief engineer.

Starting on October 1, 1904, he was the first vice-president of the Consolidated Railway. He was also in charge of construction, operation and maintenance of the trolley lines owned by the New York, New Haven and Hartford Railroad. He was the fourth vice-president, New York, New Haven and Hartford Railroad, in charge of the electrical department.

While working for the Northern Pacific, McHenry performed two notable engineering feats, and made one memorable marketing suggestion:

- In the 1880s McHenry was the principal assistant engineer on Stampede Pass during the construction of Stampede Tunnel, linking western Washington and especially the Puget Sound ports of Seattle and Tacoma to the East by rail.
- In the early 1890s McHenry was tasked with locating a line from the vicinity of Logan westward to Butte, Montana. During the course of this work McHenry discovered Homestake Pass, the pass which Interstate 90 now crosses the Continental Divide in Montana.
- In 1893, McHenry was in Chicago visiting the Columbian Exposition. While there, he visited the Korean display and noticed the prominent ying-yang symbol (or Monad) in the Korean flag. He suggested the suitability of this symbol to the Northern Pacific General Passenger Agent Charles S. Fee and c. 1896 the symbol was adopted as the logotype of the newly reorganized Northern Pacific Railway.

McHenry died on August 21, 1931, in Ardmore, Pennsylvania.

== Legacy ==
McHenry, North Dakota, was named by the Northern Pacific for him. Frances, Washington, was named by McHenry for his wife, whose middle name was Frances.

== Engineering ==
- In the 1880s on the Northern Pacific, McHenry was the principal assistant engineer on Stampede Pass during the construction of Stampede Tunnel, linking western Washington and especially the Puget Sound ports of Seattle and Tacoma to the East by rail.
- In the early 1890s McHenry was tasked with locating a line from the vicinity of Logan westward to Butte, Montana. During the course of this work McHenry discovered Homestake Pass, the pass which Interstate 90 now crosses the Continental Divide in Montana.

== Publications and papers ==
- McHenry, Edwin H. Rules for Railway Location and Construction Used on the Northern Pacific Railway [with a chapter on] Estimating Overhaul in Earthwork. New York: Engineering News Publishing, 1901.
- McHenry's papers as chief engineer of the Northern Pacific are held by the Minnesota Historical Society in St. Paul, Minnesota. Some additional papers and correspondence are held by the University of Montana's K. Ross Toole Archives in Missoula, Montana.

Preceded by	Vice President of the New York, New Haven and Hartford Railroad	Succeeded by
Preceded by position created	Vice President of the Consolidated Railway; 1904-?	Succeeded by
