= Dell (name) =

Dell is an English unisex given name, nickname, and surname. It means "small valley or glen" and comes from the Old English word del.

Its feminine form, popular in the early 20th century, is Della.

Notable people and fictional characters with the name include:

== Given name or nickname ==
=== People ===
- Dell Akbar Khan (born 1952), Malaysian football player
- Dell Alston (born 1952), American baseball player
- Dell Bull (born 1965), American retired Naval Flight Officer
- Dell Curry (born 1964), American former National Basketball Association player
- Dell L. Dailey (born 1949), American retired lieutenant general and government official
- Dell Darling (1861–1904), American baseball player
- Dell Demps (born 1970), American basketball player and executive
- Dell Henderson (1877–1956), Canadian actor, director and writer
- Dell Hymes (1927–2009), American ethnographer, sociolinguist, anthropologist and folklorist
- Dell Morgan (c. 1900–1962), American football player and coach of football, basketball and baseball
- Dell O'Dell (1902–1962), stage name of American magician Odella Newton
- Dell Pettus (born 2001), American football player
- Dell Raybould (1933–2023), American politician
- Dell Williams (1922–2015), American feminist and businesswoman

=== Fictional characters ===
- Dell, in Fields of Mistria
- Dell Conagher, in Team Fortress 2
- Dell Parker, in the TV series Private Practice
- Dell Toledo, in American Horror Story: Freak Show

== Surname ==
- Aaron Dell (born 1989), Canadian ice hockey goaltender
- Alan Dell (1924–1995), British radio broadcaster
- Allan Dell (born 1992), South African-born Scottish rugby player
- Bernard Dell (born 1949), Australian botanist
- Christian Dell (1893–1974), German silversmith and designer
- Christopher Dell (born 1956), American diplomat
- Christopher Dell (cricketer) (born 1960), Australian former cricketer
- Claudia Dell (1910–1977), American showgirl and actress
- Diana Dell (1982), Russian actress
- Dick Dell (born 1947), American tennis player
- Donald Dell (born 1938), American tennis player
- Dorothy Dell (1915–1934), American actress
- Edmund Dell (1921–1999), British politician
- Etheline E. Dell (1865–1891), English artist and illustrator
- Ethel M. Dell (1881–1939), British romance novelist
- Floyd Dell (1887–1969), American newspaper and magazine editor, literary critic, novelist, playwright and poet
- Gabriel Dell (1919–1988), American actor, one of the Dead End Kids
- Gaye Dell (born 1948), Australian hurdler and children's author
- Glen Dell (1962–2013), South African commercial airline trainer and aerobatics pilot
- Jimmy Dell (1924–2008), British test pilot
- John Henry Dell (1830–1888), English landscape artist and illustrator
- Michael Dell (born 1965), American businessman, founder and CEO of Dell, Inc.
- Miriam Dell (1924–2022), New Zealand women's advocate
- Peter Dell the Elder (1490–1552), German sculptor
- Philip Dell, American politician in Florida from the 1820s to the 1850s and plantation owner
- Richard Dell (1920–2002), New Zealand malacologist
- Roger L. Dell (1897–1966), American jurist
- Salome Dell (born 1983), athlete from Papua New Guinea
- Susan Dell (born 1963 or 64), American businesswoman and philanthropist
- Tank Dell (born 1999), American football player
- Tony Dell (born 1947), Australian cricketer
- Wheezer Dell (1886–1966), American Major League Baseball pitcher
- William Dell (c. 1607–1669), English clergyman and radical Parliamentarian

== See also ==
- Big Dell, nickname of Wendell Sailor (born 1974), Australian rugby footballer
- Del (disambiguation), contains list of people with given name Del
- O'Dell, a surname
