= List of railroad crossings of the North American continental divide =

A crossing of the North American continental divide is necessary for any transcontinental railroad in North America, and has always been one of the hardest obstacles. This article lists such crossings from north to south.

== Canada ==
Location	Province(s)	Elevation	Built by	Current/Last	Years of operation	Notes
west of O'Dell	British Columbia	747 m (2,451 ft)	Pacific Great Eastern Railway	Canadian National Railway	1967–present	First of two crossings, about 4 miles apart, on CN Stuart Sub
south of Summit Lake	British Columbia	716 m (2,349 ft)	Pacific Great Eastern Railway	Canadian National Railway	1967–present	Second of two crossings on CN Stuart Sub
east of Summit Lake	British Columbia	728 m (2,388 ft)	Pacific Great Eastern Railway	Canadian National Railway	1958–present	
Yellowhead Pass	Alberta and British Columbia	1,110 m (3,642 ft)	Canadian Northern Railway and Grand Trunk Pacific Railway	Canadian National Railway	1914–present	Originally two lines. GTP built 1914, CNoR built 1915. Consolidated into one line in 1917, with some adjustments in 1924
Kicking Horse Pass	Alberta and British Columbia	1,627 m (5,338 ft)	Canadian Pacific Railway	Canadian Pacific Railway	1884–present	
Crowsnest Pass	Alberta and British Columbia	1,358 m (4,455 ft)	Canadian Pacific Railway	Canadian Pacific Railway	1897–present	

== United States ==
Location	State(s)	Elevation	Built by	Currently	Years of operation	Notes
Marias Pass	Montana	5,213 ft (1,589 m)	Great Northern Railway	BNSF Railway	1893–present	Hi-Line
Mullan Pass	Montana	5,566 ft (1,697 m)	Northern Pacific Railroad	BNSF Railway	1883–present	Passes through the Mullan Tunnel
Elk Park Pass	Montana	6,365 ft (1,940 m)	Great Northern Railway	Burlington Northern Railroad	1888–1972	
Homestake Pass	Montana	6,328 ft (1,929 m)	Northern Pacific Railroad	BNSF Railway	1888–present (dormant since 1983)	
Pipestone Pass	Montana	6,347 ft (1,935 m)	Chicago, Milwaukee, St. Paul and Pacific Railroad	Chicago, Milwaukee, St. Paul and Pacific Railroad	1909–1980	Passed through the Pipestone Pass Tunnel
Deer Lodge Pass	Montana	5,801 ft (1,768 m)	Utah and Northern Railway	Union Pacific Railroad	1881–present	Narrow gauge until 1887; railroad name Feely
Bannock Pass	Montana and Idaho	7,575 ft (2,309 m)	Gilmore and Pittsburgh Railroad	Gilmore and Pittsburgh Railroad	1910–1939	Tunnel at summit
Monida Pass	Montana and Idaho	6,823 ft (2,080 m)	Utah and Northern Railway	Union Pacific Railroad	1880–present	Narrow gauge until 1886
Reas Pass	Montana and Idaho	6,930 ft (2,112 m)	Union Pacific Railroad	Union Pacific Railroad	1905–1981	Branch to West Yellowstone
South Pass	Wyoming	7,420 ft (2,262 m)	U.S. Steel	U.S. Steel	1962–1983	Served U.S. Steel Atlantic City Ore Mine
Robinson	Wyoming	6,940 ft (2,115 m)	Union Pacific Railroad	Union Pacific Railroad	1868–present	Two sides of the Great Divide Basin; Robinson is the true Divide (per USGS)
Hadsell	Wyoming	6,930 ft (2,112 m)	Union Pacific Railroad	Union Pacific Railroad	1868–present	Two sides of the Great Divide Basin; Robinson is the true Divide (per USGS)
Rollins Pass	Colorado	11,660 ft (3,554 m) (1904), 9,239 ft (2,816 m) (1928)	Denver, Northwestern and Pacific Railway	Union Pacific Railroad	1904–present	Original alignment replaced in 1928 by the Moffat Tunnel )
Jones Pass	Colorado	8,964 ft (2,732 m)	Henderson Mine		1976–1999	Narrow gauge, passed through the Henderson Tunnel; replaced by a conveyor belt; elevation is for west (and only) portal
Boreas Pass	Colorado	11,493 ft (3,503 m)	Denver, South Park and Pacific Railroad	Colorado and Southern Railway	1882–1937	Narrow gauge
Fremont Pass	Colorado	11,319 ft (3,450 m)	Denver, South Park and Pacific Railroad	Colorado and Southern Railway	1884–1937	Narrow gauge. Line south of Climax retained, converted to standard gauge 1943, now operated by Leadville, Colorado and Southern Railroad
Fremont Pass	Colorado	11,330 ft (3,453 m)	Denver and Rio Grande Railroad	Denver and Rio Grande Western Railroad	1881–1923	Narrow gauge
Tennessee Pass	Colorado	10,424 ft (3,177 m)	Denver and Rio Grande Railroad	Denver and Rio Grande Railroad	1887–1890	Narrow gauge, replaced by standard gauge Tennessee Pass Tunnel
Tennessee Pass	Colorado	10,239 ft (3,121 m) (1890), 10,221 ft (3,115 m) (1945)	Denver and Rio Grande Railroad	Union Pacific Railroad (dormant)	1890–present (dormant since 1997)	Passed through the Tennessee Pass Tunnel (original tunnel built 1890, replaced in 1945)
Hagerman Pass	Colorado	11,528 ft (3,514 m) (1887),10,953 ft (3,338 m) (1893)	Colorado Midland Railway	Colorado Midland Railway	1887–1918	Passed through the Hagerman Tunnel, replaced in 1893 by the Busk-Ivanhoe Tunnel. Reverted to original route between 1897 and 1899
Alpine Tunnel	Colorado	11,612 ft (3,539 m)	Denver, South Park and Pacific Railroad	Colorado and Southern Railway	1881–1910	Narrow gauge
Marshall Pass	Colorado	10,856 ft (3,309 m)	Denver and Rio Grande Railroad	Denver and Rio Grande Western Railroad	1881–1953	Narrow gauge. Original D&RG mainline before Tennessee Pass line opened
Azotea	New Mexico	7,773 ft (2,369 m)	Denver and Rio Grande Railroad	Denver and Rio Grande Western Railroad	1880–1968	Narrow gauge
Hillcrest	New Mexico	7,714 ft (2,351 m)	Rio Grande and Southwestern Railroad	Rio Grande and Southwestern Railroad	1903–1924	Narrow gauge
Campbell Pass	New Mexico	7,244 ft (2,208 m)	Atchison, Topeka and Santa Fe Railway	BNSF Railway	1882–present	
Tyrone	New Mexico	5,990 ft (1,826 m)	Burro Mountain Railroad	Southwestern Railroad		Serves Phelps Dodge copper pit; short tunnel under Divide
Wilna	New Mexico	4,584 ft (1,397 m)	Southern Pacific Railroad	Union Pacific Railroad	1883–present	Lordsburg Subdivision
Hachita	New Mexico	4,495 ft (1,370 m)	Arizona and New Mexico Railroad	Southern Pacific Railroad	1902–1934	
Vista	New Mexico	4,650 ft (1,417 m) (east), 4,694 ft (1,431 m) (west)	El Paso and Southwestern Railroad	Southern Pacific Railroad	1902–1961	Two crossings 2 miles apart
(name unknown)	New Mexico	4,525 ft (1,379 m)	Phelps Dodge	Phelps Dodge	1970s–1999	Line served Hidalgo Smelter
Antelope	New Mexico	4,510 ft (1,375 m)	El Paso and Southwestern Railroad	Southern Pacific Railroad	1902–1961	

== Mexico ==
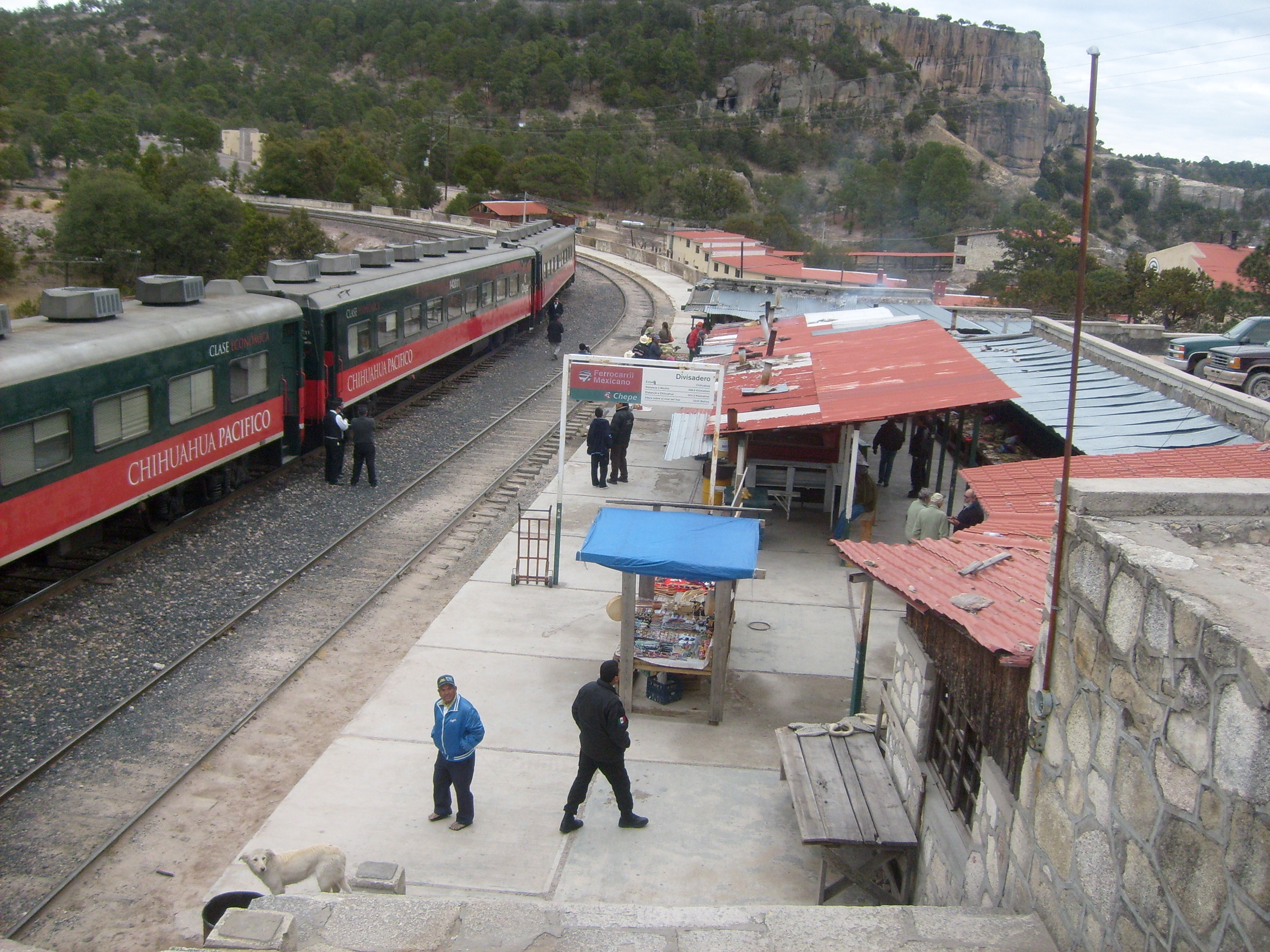
El Chepe train at Divisadero Chihuahua, 8 February 2009

Location	State(s)	Elevation	Built by	Currently	Years of operation	Notes
Divisadero	Chihuahua	2,270 m (7,448 ft)	Ferrocarriles Nacionales de México	Ferromex	1961–present	
Francisco I. Madero	Durango	2,000 m (6,562 ft)		Ferrocarril Coahuila Durango	1892–present	
Niza Conejo; Chivela Pass	Oaxaca	224 m (735 ft)	Ferrocarril Nacional de Tehuantepec	Ferrocarril del Istmo de Tehuantepec	1894–present	

== Central America ==
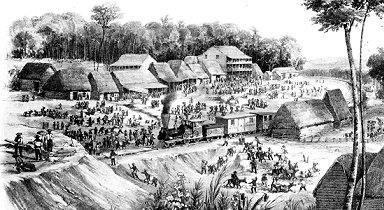
Culebra summit; December 1854

Location	Elevation	Built by	Current or last operator	Years of operation	Notes
Chato Guatemala		International Railways of Central America (div. of United Fruit)	FEGUA	1908–1996	
Ochomogo Pass Costa Rica	1,500 metres (4,900 ft)		Incofer	1870s–1991	9.898637°N 83.945031°W
Culebra Cut Panama	80.4 metres (264 ft)	Panama Railroad Company	Panama Canal Railway Company (div. of Kansas City Southern Railway)	1855–present	9°3′24″N 79°38′20″W

The Ecocanal is a proposal to build a rail line across Nicaragua from Monkey Point on the Caribbean to Corinto on the Pacific. If built, the rail line will cross the continental divide in Nicaragua, likely at a point north of Lake Nicaragua.

== See also ==
- List of Rocky Mountain passes on the continental divide
- Trans-Andean railways crossings of South America
