= Dell (disambiguation) =

Dell is a computer design-and-manufacturing company.

Dell, Dells, or The Dell also may refer to:

== Geography ==
- Dell (landform), a small valley
- Dell, Arkansas, a town
- Dell, Minnesota, an unincorporated community
- Dell, Missouri, an unincorporated community
- Dell, Montana, an unincorporated community
- The Dell, Leamington Spa, a park in Warwickshire, England

== People and fictional characters ==
- Dell (name), a surname, given name and nickname (including a list of people and fictional characters with the name)
- Michael Dell, founder of Dell Technologies

== Businesses ==
- Dell Technologies, parent company of Dell Inc.
- Dell Publishing, now an imprint of Random House
  - Dell Comics, the comic-book arm (1929-1974)
  - Dell Magazines, the magazine arm

== Buildings ==
- Dell Diamond, a minor league baseball stadium in Round Rock, Texas
- The Dell, Kingussie, a shinty stadium, home of Kingussie Camanachd in Scotland
- The Dell, Southampton, former home of Southampton F.C.
- Falmouth Town railway station, known as The Dell between 1974 and 1989
- The Dell, Thurrock, a concrete house in Grays, Essex, England, built by Alfred Russel Wallace

== Other uses ==
- The Dells, a rhythm and blues musical act, starting 1952
- Dell Children's Medical Center of Central Texas, a pediatric trauma center
- Dell Medical School, the graduate medical school of the University of Texas at Austin
- Dell Bridge, a footbridge in Port Sunlight, Wirral, England

== See also ==
- Dell City, Texas, a city
- Del (disambiguation)
- Dale (disambiguation)
- O'Dell (disambiguation)
