= Garrison, Montana =

- CDP
- Location of Garrison, Montana
- Coordinates: 46°31′30″N 112°49′35″W
- Country: United States
- State: Montana
- County: Powell

Area
  - Total: 9.64 sq mi (24.96 km^{2})
  - Land: 9.63 sq mi (24.95 km^{2})
  - Water: 0.0039 sq mi (0.01 km^{2})
- Elevation: 4,410 ft (1,340 m)

Population (2020)
  - Total: 115
  - Density: 11.9/sq mi (4.61/km^{2})
- Time zone: UTC-7 (Mountain (MST))
  - Summer (DST): UTC-6 (MDT)
- ZIP code: 59731
- Area code: 406
- FIPS code: 30-30175
- GNIS feature ID: 2408285

Garrison is a census-designated place (CDP) in Powell County, Montana, United States. As of the 2020 census, Garrison had a population of 115.

The traditional Salish name for the area that was later named Garrison Junction is snx̣ʷq̓pusaqs. Groups would split up here, with some going towards Helena, others towards Butte.

== History ==
A post office called Garrison was established in 1883, and remained in operation until 2015٫ The community was named for William Lloyd Garrison, an abolitionist, who was also the father-in-law of Henry Villard, the man who finally pushed the Northern Pacific Railroad to completion in 1883. Garrison is just east of Gold Creek, where the 'golden spike' was driven on September 8, 1883, to mark the completion of the line. Among others present for the occasion was former President Ulysses S. Grant. Garrison was also a division point for the Northern Pacific; as well as its successors Burlington Northern, Montana Rail Link, and BNSF, with traffic heading east to Helena or south and east to Butte. Heading towards Helena traffic crosses Mullan Pass, while just outside of Butte Homestake Pass is used. The lines converge again in Logan, Montana just outside of Three Forks.

== Geography ==
According to the United States Census Bureau, the CDP has a total area of 9.5 square miles (25 km^{2}), all land.

== Demographics ==
Historical population
Census	Pop.	Note	%±
2020	115		—
U.S. Decennial Census

As of the census of 2000, there were 112 people, 50 households, and 34 families residing in the CDP. The population density was 11.7 inhabitants per square mile (4.5/km^{2}). There were 63 housing units at an average density of 6.6 per square mile (2.5/km^{2}). The racial makeup of the CDP was 91.96% White, 4.46% Native American, and 3.57% from two or more races. Hispanic or Latino of any race were 1.79% of the population.

There were 50 households, out of which 22.0% had children under the age of 18 living with them, 52.0% were married couples living together, 8.0% had a female householder with no husband present, and 32.0% were non-families. 24.0% of all households were made up of individuals, and 10.0% had someone living alone who was 65 years of age or older. The average household size was 2.24 and the average family size was 2.62.

In the CDP, the population was spread out, with 20.5% under the age of 18, 4.5% from 18 to 24, 23.2% from 25 to 44, 31.3% from 45 to 64, and 20.5% who were 65 years of age or older. The median age was 46 years. For every 100 females, there were 119.6 males. For every 100 females age 18 and over, there were 117.1 males.

The median income for a household in the CDP was $33,250, and the median income for a family was $32,656. Males had a median income of $16,250 versus $28,250 for females. The per capita income for the CDP was $12,678. There were 35.5% of families and 36.4% of the population living below the poverty line, including 90.0% of under eighteens and none of those over 64.
