= Pipestone Pass =

Pipestone Pass may be refer to:

- Pipestone Pass (Alberta), a pass in Banff National Park, Alberta, Canada (see List of passes of the Rocky Mountains
- Pipestone Pass (Montana), a pass on the Continental Divide of the Americas in Silver Bow County, Montana, United States
