= Odwell =

Odwell is a surname. Notable people with the surname include:

- Dave Odwell (born 1952), British boxer
- Fred Odwell (1872–1948), American baseball player
- George Odwell (1911–1995), British boxer

== See also ==
- Odell (surname)
- Oswell (disambiguation)
