= Campbell Pass =

Crossing of the Continental Divide in New Mexico

- Interactive map of Campbell Pass
- Elevation: 7,270 feet (2,220 m)
- Traversed by: I-40, BNSF Railway

Third Approach
- Location: McKinley County, New Mexico, US
- Range: Rocky Mountains
- Coordinates: 35°25′19″N 108°18′30″W
- Topo map: USGS Continental Divide

Campbell Pass is an infrequently used name for a heavily travelled crossing of the Continental Divide in west-central New Mexico. This broad, gentle mountain pass, located in McKinley County between Gallup and Grants, is the site of the town of Continental Divide. The pass was selected as the route to be traversed by the original main line of the Atchison, Topeka and Santa Fe Railway in 1880 (now the Southern Transcon of the BNSF Railway). The famous U.S. Route 66 was built through the pass in 1926, and is now the route of its successor, Interstate 40.

The origin of the name Campbell Pass is obscure, and it appears to be used mostly in connection with the railroad.

== See also ==
- List of railroad crossings of the North American continental divide
  - Yellowhead Pass, the Canadian Northern crossing
  - Kicking Horse Pass, the Canadian Pacific's first crossing
  - Marias Pass, the Great Northern crossing
  - Mullan Pass, the Northern Pacific's first crossing
  - Creston, Wyoming, the Union Pacific's first crossing
  - Tennessee Pass, the Denver and Rio Grande Western crossing
  - Wilna, New Mexico, the Southern Pacific crossing
