= Marias Pass =

Mountain pass in Montana

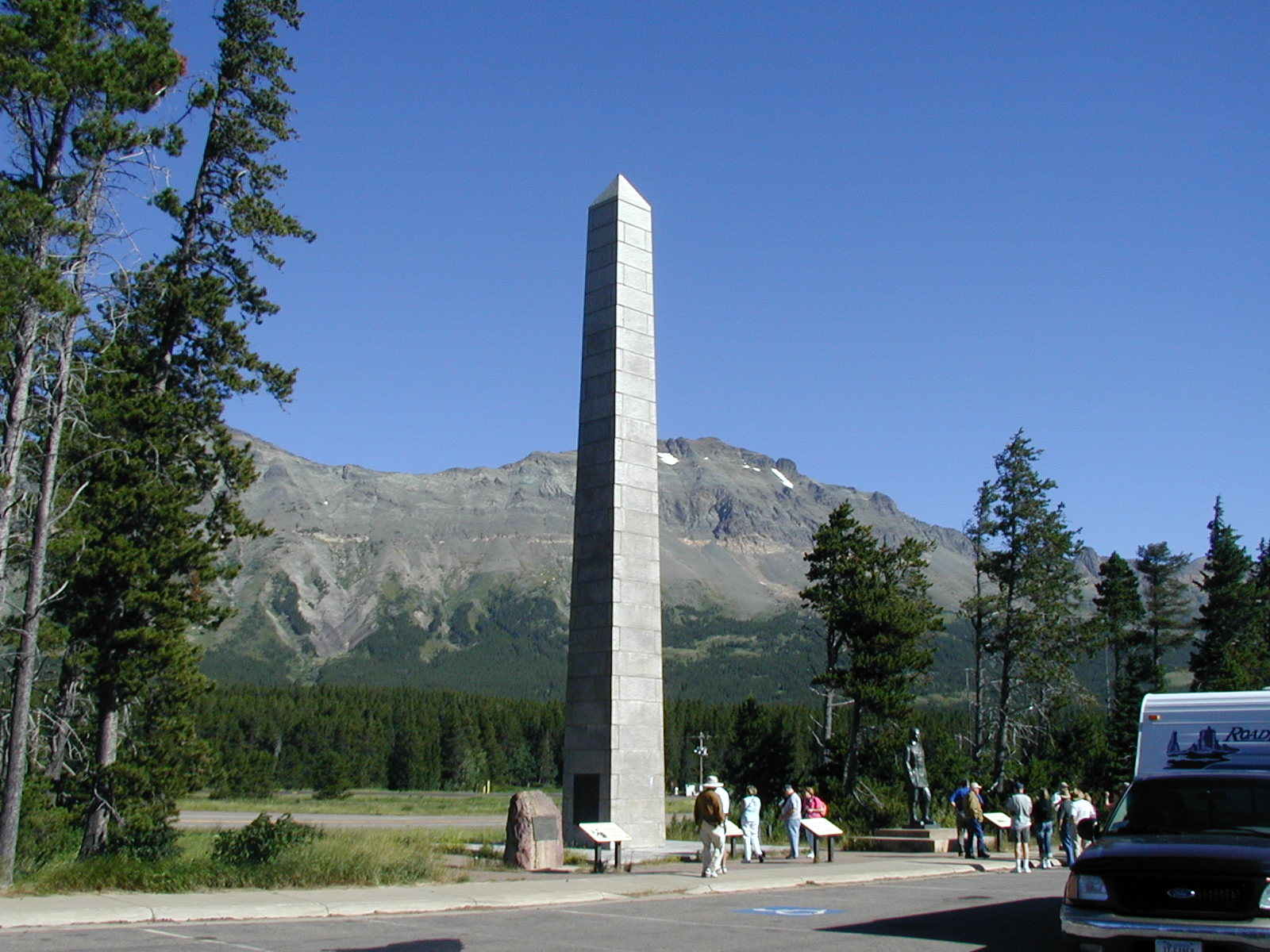
- Marias Pass obelisk and statue of John F. Stevens.

- Location within the United States Location within Montana
- Elevation: 5,213 ft (1,589 m)
- Traversed by: US 2, BNSF Railway, and Amtrak Empire Builder

Third Approach
- Location: Glacier County, Montana, U.S.
- Range: Lewis Range
- Coordinates: 48.3183°N 113.3552°W

Marias Pass (elevation 5,213 feet (1,589 m)) is a mountain pass in the Rocky Mountains in the state of Montana in the Western United States. Lying on the southern border of Glacier National Park, it is traversed by US Highway 2 and by the BNSF Hi-Line Subdivision. The pass is the lowest crossing of the Continental Divide between Canada and central New Mexico, and is the northernmost pass in the US open to automobile traffic year-round.

== Geography ==
Marias Pass traverses the Continental Divide in the Lewis Range, along the boundary between the Lewis and Clark National Forest and the Flathead National Forest. The pass forms the southern limit of the Continental Ranges, a major grouping of the Rocky Mountains which extends as far north as McGregor Pass in the Northern Rockies of the Canadian province of British Columbia. The Great Bear Wilderness in Lewis and Clark National Forest is south of the pass and Glacier National Park is to the north.

== Climate ==
Climate data for Summit, Montana, 2000–2020 normals, 1903-2020 extremes: 5233ft (1595m)
Month	Jan	Feb	Mar	Apr	May	Jun	Jul	Aug	Sep	Oct	Nov	Dec	Year
Record high °F (°C)	56 (13)	56 (13)	63 (17)	78 (26)	81 (27)	111 (44)	93 (34)	96 (36)	92 (33)	82 (28)	64 (18)	57 (14)	111 (44)
Mean maximum °F (°C)	43.6 (6.4)	43.5 (6.4)	52.0 (11.1)	61.9 (16.6)	72.5 (22.5)	82.8 (28.2)	87.7 (30.9)	86.9 (30.5)	81.1 (27.3)	67.6 (19.8)	53.0 (11.7)	42.1 (5.6)	90.0 (32.2)
Mean daily maximum °F (°C)	28.7 (−1.8)	29.8 (−1.2)	36.1 (2.3)	44.3 (6.8)	53.9 (12.2)	63.5 (17.5)	74.8 (23.8)	74.0 (23.3)	62.3 (16.8)	47.0 (8.3)	35.1 (1.7)	27.5 (−2.5)	48.1 (8.9)
Daily mean °F (°C)	22.2 (−5.4)	21.8 (−5.7)	28.3 (−2.1)	35.2 (1.8)	42.8 (6.0)	51.0 (10.6)	59.2 (15.1)	58.1 (14.5)	49.6 (9.8)	38.3 (3.5)	29.0 (−1.7)	21.5 (−5.8)	38.1 (3.4)
Mean daily minimum °F (°C)	15.1 (−9.4)	13.1 (−10.5)	19.9 (−6.7)	25.7 (−3.5)	31.5 (−0.3)	38.4 (3.6)	43.6 (6.4)	42.1 (5.6)	36.8 (2.7)	29.3 (−1.5)	22.6 (−5.2)	15.0 (−9.4)	27.8 (−2.3)
Mean minimum °F (°C)	−13.7 (−25.4)	−11.6 (−24.2)	−0.4 (−18.0)	11.9 (−11.2)	21.9 (−5.6)	29.4 (−1.4)	34.2 (1.2)	31.9 (−0.1)	25.0 (−3.9)	11.2 (−11.6)	−0.5 (−18.1)	−8.8 (−22.7)	−21.4 (−29.7)
Record low °F (°C)	−53 (−47)	−53 (−47)	−42 (−41)	−30 (−34)	0 (−18)	15 (−9)	22 (−6)	19 (−7)	5 (−15)	−30 (−34)	−39 (−39)	−46 (−43)	−53 (−47)
Average precipitation inches (mm)	5.47 (139)	4.57 (116)	4.83 (123)	3.92 (100)	3.90 (99)	4.02 (102)	1.23 (31)	1.51 (38)	2.58 (66)	4.05 (103)	5.39 (137)	5.58 (142)	47.05 (1,196)
Source 1: XMACIS2
Source 2: NOAA (Pike Creek precipitation)

Climate data for Summit, Montana
Month	Jan	Feb	Mar	Apr	May	Jun	Jul	Aug	Sep	Oct	Nov	Dec	Year
Record high °F (°C)	56 (13)	56 (13)	63 (17)	78 (26)	81 (27)	92 (33)	93 (34)	96 (36)	92 (33)	82 (28)	64 (18)	57 (14)	96 (36)
Mean maximum °F (°C)	42.0 (5.6)	44.1 (6.7)	51.4 (10.8)	62.4 (16.9)	72.4 (22.4)	80.7 (27.1)	86.0 (30.0)	85.7 (29.8)	79.9 (26.6)	68.3 (20.2)	51.3 (10.7)	43.4 (6.3)	87.9 (31.1)
Mean daily maximum °F (°C)	23.3 (−4.8)	28.6 (−1.9)	34.1 (1.2)	44.4 (6.9)	55.4 (13.0)	62.8 (17.1)	72.9 (22.7)	71.6 (22.0)	61.0 (16.1)	48.7 (9.3)	33.6 (0.9)	27.3 (−2.6)	47.0 (8.3)
Daily mean °F (°C)	15.3 (−9.3)	19.9 (−6.7)	24.5 (−4.2)	33.9 (1.1)	43.0 (6.1)	50.0 (10.0)	57.0 (13.9)	55.4 (13.0)	47.6 (8.7)	38.8 (3.8)	26.2 (−3.2)	20.1 (−6.6)	36.0 (2.2)
Mean daily minimum °F (°C)	7.2 (−13.8)	11.1 (−11.6)	14.6 (−9.7)	23.3 (−4.8)	30.6 (−0.8)	37.4 (3.0)	41.1 (5.1)	39.1 (3.9)	34.1 (1.2)	28.8 (−1.8)	18.9 (−7.3)	13.0 (−10.6)	24.9 (−3.9)
Mean minimum °F (°C)	−23.5 (−30.8)	−18.2 (−27.9)	−13.3 (−25.2)	3.9 (−15.6)	18.7 (−7.4)	26.6 (−3.0)	30.8 (−0.7)	28.2 (−2.1)	20.8 (−6.2)	10.0 (−12.2)	−5.2 (−20.7)	−16.6 (−27.0)	−38.1 (−38.9)
Record low °F (°C)	−53 (−47)	−53 (−47)	−42 (−41)	−30 (−34)	0 (−18)	15 (−9)	25 (−4)	19 (−7)	5 (−15)	−30 (−34)	−39 (−39)	−46 (−43)	−53 (−47)
Average precipitation inches (mm)	4.68 (119)	3.73 (95)	3.27 (83)	2.78 (71)	2.88 (73)	3.59 (91)	1.34 (34)	1.66 (42)	2.34 (59)	2.86 (73)	3.97 (101)	4.47 (114)	37.57 (955)
Average snowfall inches (cm)	50.8 (129)	39.1 (99)	34.8 (88)	23.7 (60)	8.5 (22)	1.0 (2.5)	0.1 (0.25)	0.0 (0.0)	4.7 (12)	10.9 (28)	33.7 (86)	42.0 (107)	249.3 (633.75)
Average precipitation days (≥ 0.01 in)	18	15	16	13	13	13	7	8	10	11	15	18	157
Source: Wester Research Climate Center

== History ==
Although Marias Pass had long been known to Native Americans and early fur trappers, its potential for use beyond foot traffic was not recognized until the middle of the nineteenth century.

=== Survey of 1853 ===
In 1853 Congress approved funding to survey possible routes for a transcontinental railroad. The project was known as the Pacific Railroad Surveys, and Isaac Stevens (who had just been appointed as the first governor of Washington Territory) was chosen to lead the survey of the northernmost of the four candidate routes. Stevens’ report of that survey, published in 1860, provides detailed insights. Of September 5, 1853, Stevens writes:

Mr. Lander was busily occupied to-day in fitting out his party for the survey of Marias Pass, in reference to which I also gained some general information that satisfied me of the existence of a pass in that quarter. Since I have given my attention to the passes of these mountains, I have been greatly impressed with the fact, from the course of the streams and the general deportment of the country, that there must be a good and practicable pass leading from some branch of the Marias; and at this time I was sanguine that we should find there the best solution of the question of the railroad practicability of the Rocky Mountain range.

Governor Stevens’ confident entry for September 5 (written years later) could have been colored by the events of a few days later:

From the Little Dog, a prominent chief of the Piegan tribe [of Blackfeet], and a man of character and probity, I got a very particular description of the Marias Pass we were in search of. From some superstition of the Blackfeet, it has not been used for many years, but formerly it was almost the only thoroughfare made use of by the Indians in passing from one side of the mountains to the other. It is a broad, wide open valley, with scarcely a hill or obstruction on the road, excepting here and there some fallen timber.

Undoubtedly feeling pressured by his duty to organize the newly-formed Washington Territory, Governor Stevens pressed on across the Rockies without locating Marias Pass. After crossing the Continental Divide at Cadotte Pass (elevation 6,073 feet (1,851 m)), Stevens sent the civilian engineer Abiel Tinkham back to look for the pass. But approaching from the steeper western side of the divide, Tinkham missed Marias Pass, and instead crossed at today’s Cut Bank Pass (elevation 7,850 feet (2,390 m)), roughly 12 miles (19 km) northwest of Marias Pass.

Upon hearing Tinkham’s report, and realizing Tinkham’s error, the determined Isaac Stevens made one final attempt to locate the elusive pass, requesting survey party member James Doty, left behind at Fort Benton, attempt to find it from the east. Stevens dutifully reported Doty’s not-quite-successful results in the Survey report:

Turning back on the 8th of June [1854], Mr. Doty retraced his route as far as the Marias, already referred to as issuing from a gap 15 miles wide, and along which was an old Indian trail, and followed it up on the trail for thirty miles to the southwest, finding no obstruction, except from trees; and at that distance, ascending a lofty hill, saw no mountains in the direction of the stream. On each side the mountains were lofty and rugged, showing, generally, perpendicular rock from within 300 feet of their summits, which were covered with snow; and snow banks were also found on the north side of many hills. It is to be regretted that Mr. Doty did not continue on, and ascertain where the trail issued on the western side of the mountains.

This is the true Marias Pass, described to me by the Little Dog at Fort Benton in September, 1853, and formerly used by the Indians in crossing the mountains.

News of such a pass was too important to wait for publication. Isaac Stevens must have spread word of Marias Pass by mouth: in 1857, three years before publication of the Survey results, James G. Swan, early resident of Washington Territory, wrote in The Northwest Coast,

In 1853, Governor Isaac I. Stevens, the first Governor of the Territory, surveyed a route for a Northern Pacific Rail-road and discovered a pass near the sources of Maria’s River suitable for a rail-road, estimated to be 2500 feet lower than the south pass of Fremont.

By modern measurements, Marias Pass is 2,337 feet (712 m) lower than the south pass of Fremont.

=== Survey of 1889 ===
Marias Pass was finally explored and charted in December 1889 by John Frank Stevens, principal engineer of the Great Northern Railway (GN). The location of the pass had been rumored for decades beforehand, but it took Stevens and a Flathead guide named Coonsah, who had been hiding out with the Blackfoot in Browning, to discover it.

The pass proved ideal for a railroad, because its approach was broad and open, within a valley ranging from one to six miles wide, and at a gentle grade that would not require extensive excavation or rockwork. Construction of the railroad through the pass began on August 1, 1890, starting east from Fort Assinniboine toward Marias Pass. The railroad followed the Middle Fork of the Flathead River west of the Continental Divide.

Stevens also discovered the pass across the Cascades in central Washington which bears his name.

== Roosevelt Memorial Obelisk ==
A memorial to President Theodore Roosevelt was constructed along the Continental Divide at the pass. Designs for the memorial were made by Kimball, Steele & Sandham of Omaha, Nebraska. Construction began in 1930, with the original intent to produce a granite archway across the highway. It was later decided to build an obelisk instead of an archway; it was completed in 1931. A cornerstone was placed to the southeast of the highway. Eleanor Roosevelt placed a small copper box filled with a copy of the bill that appropriated funds for the memorial as well as some other documents into the cornerstone. The obelisk is sixty feet (18 m) in height and extends nineteen feet (5.8 m) into the ground. It has a tapering cement core covered on all sides with seven-inch (18 cm) slabs of Montana granite quarried near Helena.

Today, U.S. Route 2 uses the pass, along with the BNSF Railway, a successor to the Great Northern Railway. The railway line, which sees freight traffic, as well as Amtrak's Empire Builder, is part of BNSF's Northern Transcon line linking Chicago and the Pacific Northwest. A statue of John Frank Stevens stands at Marias Pass.

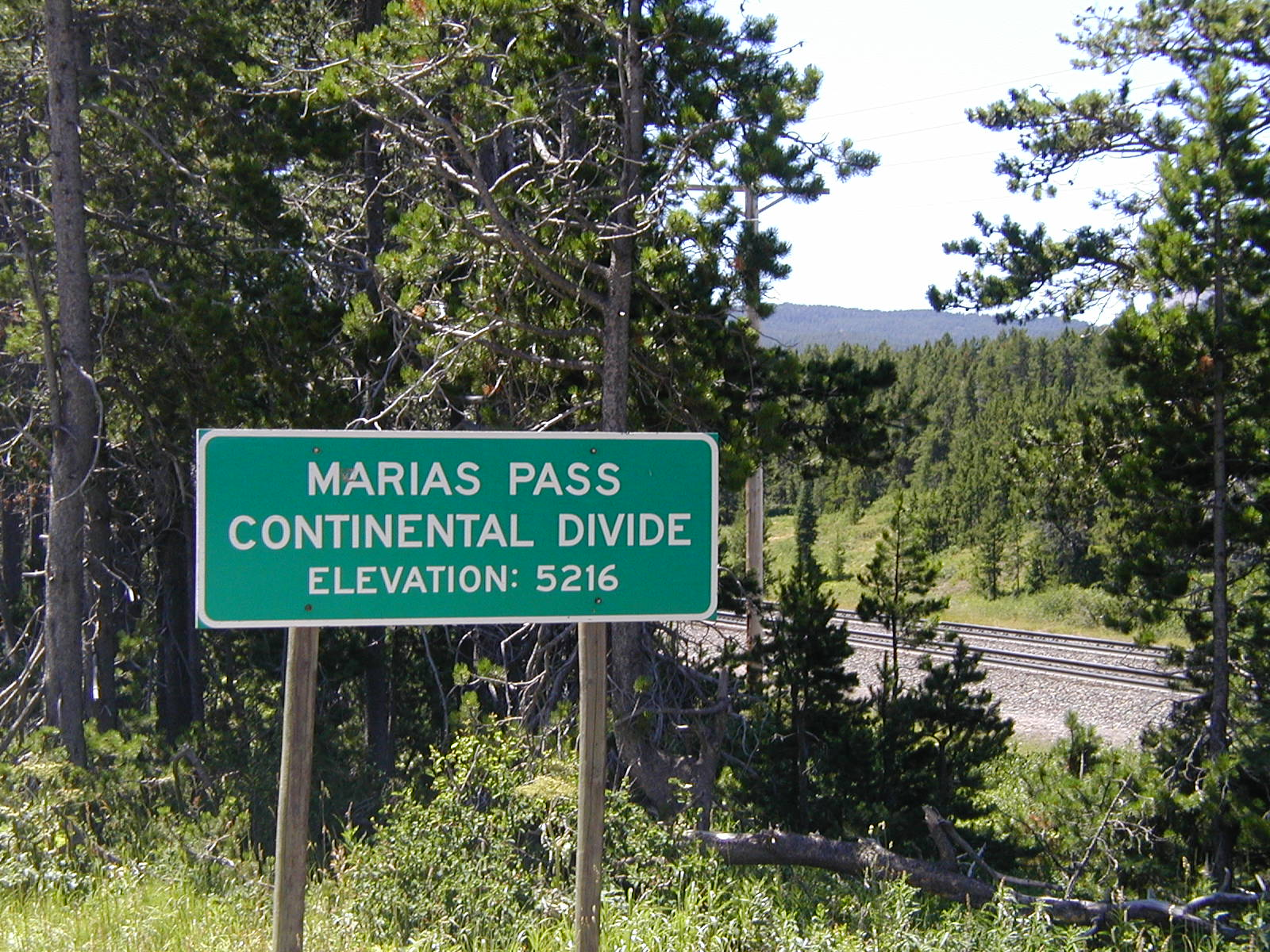
Marias Pass highway marker along US Route 2

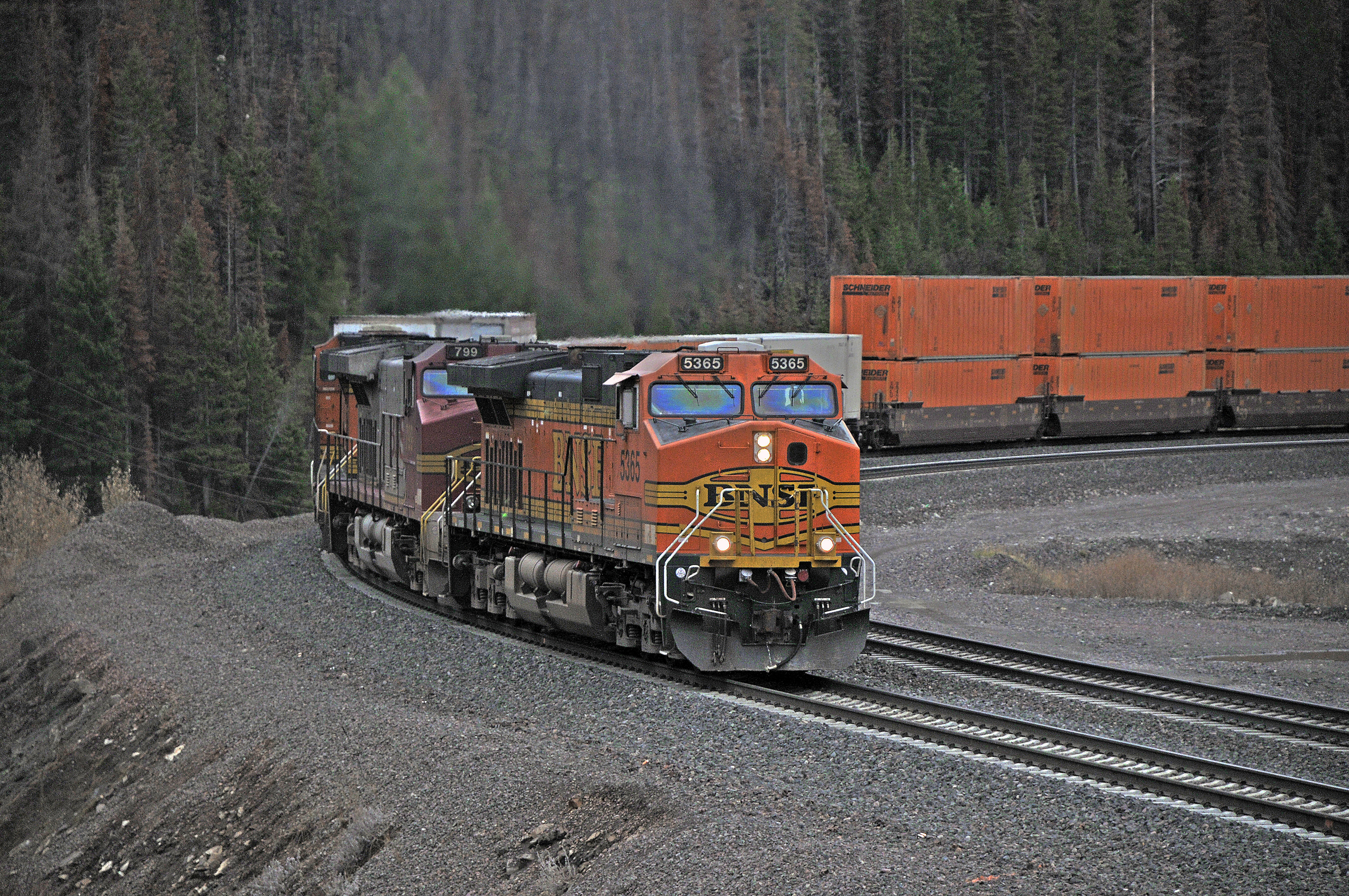
An eastbound BNSF intermodal train cresting the summit of the pass

== See also ==
- List of railroad crossings of the North American continental divide
  - Yellowhead Pass, the Canadian Northern crossing
  - Kicking Horse Pass, the Canadian Pacific's first crossing
  - Mullan Pass, the Northern Pacific's first crossing
  - Creston, Wyoming, the Union Pacific's first crossing
  - Tennessee Pass, the Denver and Rio Grande Western's crossing
  - Campbell Pass, the Santa Fe's crossing
  - Wilna, New Mexico, the Southern Pacific's crossing
- Mountain passes in Montana
