= Tennessee Pass =

Mountain pass in Colorado, USA

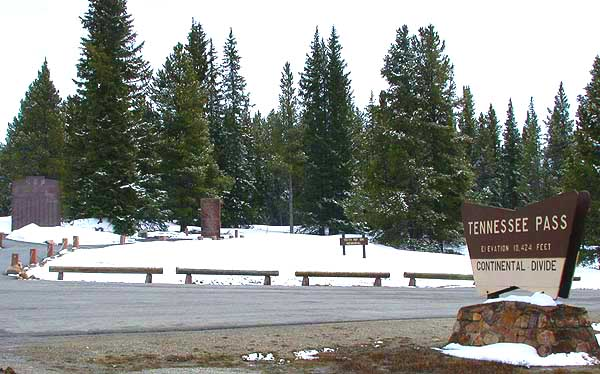
- Summit of Tennessee Pass along U.S. Highway 24, showing the memorial to the 10th Mountain Division

- Location within Colorado
- Elevation: 10,424 ft (3,177 m)
- Traversed by: US 24; Union Pacific Railroad (Out of service)

Location
- Location: Eagle / Lake counties, Colorado, U.S.
- Range: Sawatch Range
- Coordinates: 39°21′45″N 106°18′40″W
- Topo map: USGS Leadville North

Tennessee Pass elevation 10,424 ft (3,177 m) is a high mountain pass in the Rocky Mountains of central Colorado in the United States. The pass was named after Tennessee, the native state of a group of early prospectors.

== Route ==
The pass traverses the Continental Divide north of Leadville in a gap between the northern end of the Sawatch Range to the west and the northern end of the Mosquito Range to the east. It connects the headwaters of the Arkansas River to the south with the upper valley of the Eagle River (in the watershed of the Colorado River) to the north. The pass is traversed by U.S. Highway 24, allowing access between Leadville and Interstate 70 in the Eagle Valley. The pass has a gentle approach on both sides with few steep gradients and no major hairpin curves. The summit of the pass is nearly level. The road over the pass is generally open all year round, easily negotiable by most vehicles, and closes only during severe winter storms.

The summit of the pass is the location of Ski Cooper, a ski area in the San Isabel National Forest operated by permit from the United States Forest Service. Most of the area is above the tree line, providing a panoramic view of the peaks of the Sawatch Range to visitors. The area was formerly a World War II training ground for United States Army troops of the 10th Mountain Division from nearby Camp Hale. A memorial to troops of the division is located at the summit of the pass.

== Railroad line ==
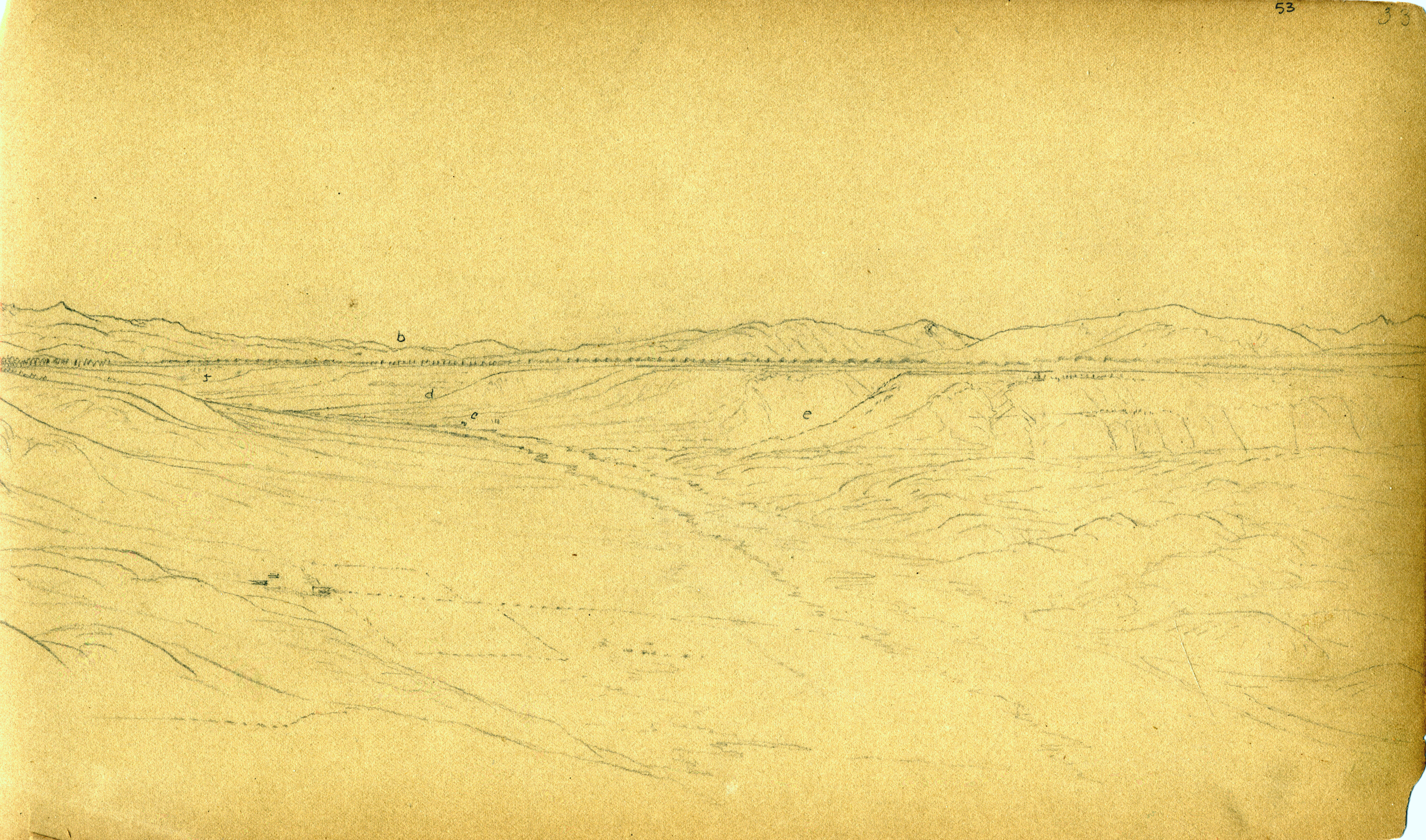
Terraces of the Upper Arkansas River. Labeled features are: b - Tennessee Pass, c - camp, d - California Gulch, and e - Iowa Gulch

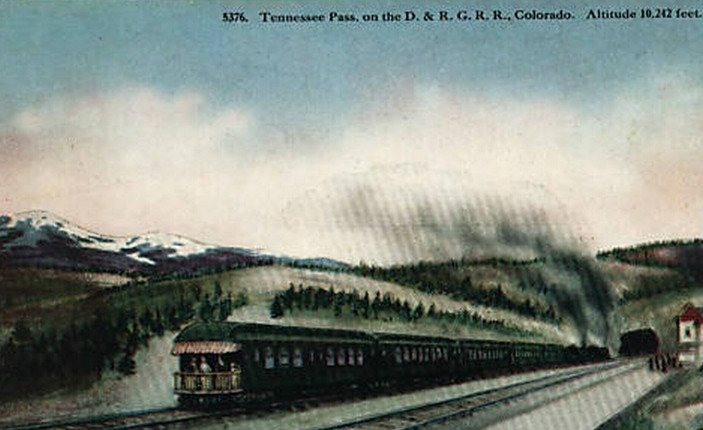
Denver & Rio Grande Western Railroad train at Tennessee Pass, c. 1910s or 1920s.

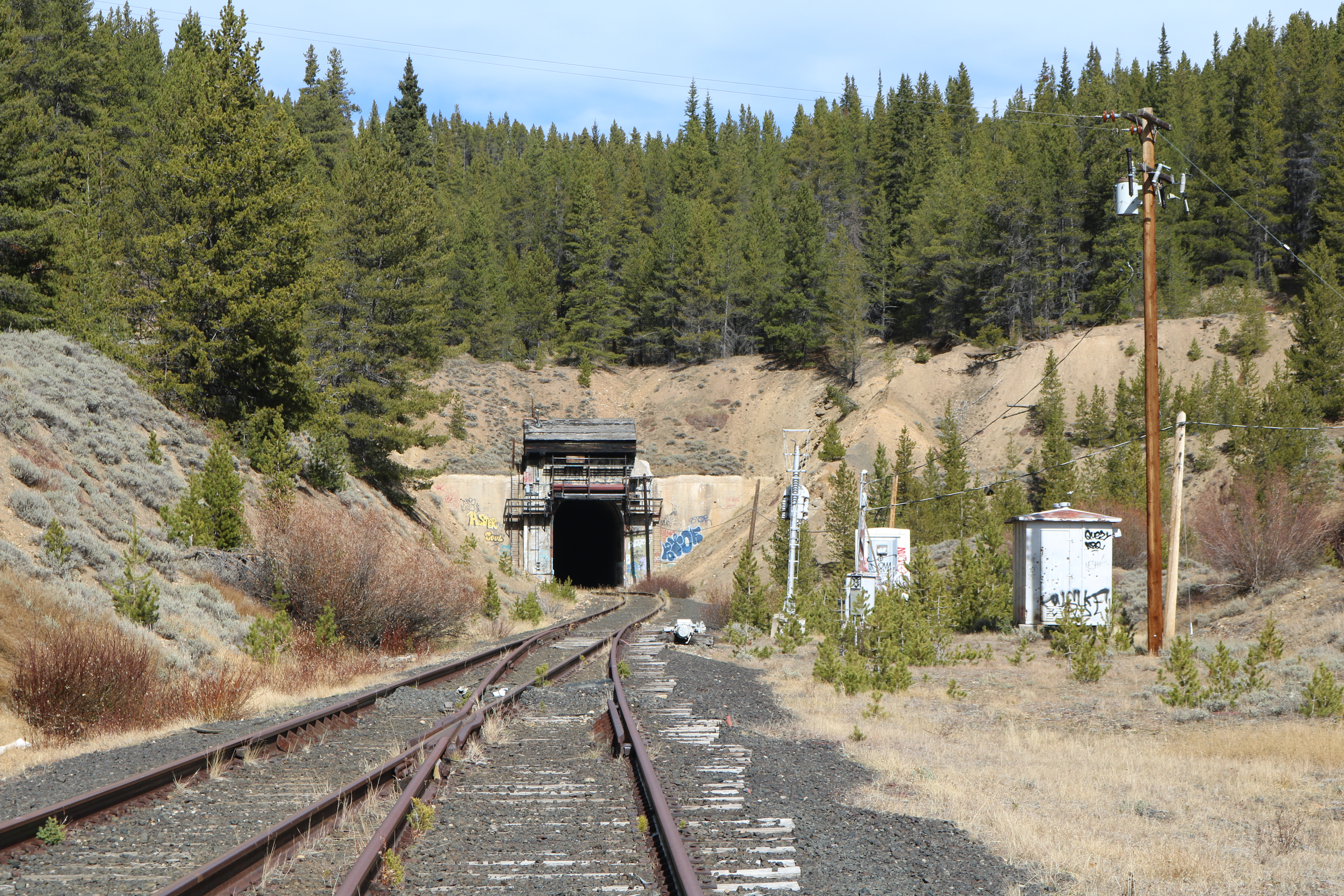
The tunnel's south portal in 2020

The Denver & Rio Grande Western Railroad constructed a narrow gauge railroad over Tennessee Pass in 1881, first as a branch line to access mines near Red Cliff, but by the mid 1880s the line became part of its extension to the Aspen area constructed in order to beat the Colorado Midland's standard gauge route to the rich mining area. In 1890, a new standard gauge line was built from Pueblo, to Grand Junction, and jointly with the Colorado Midland Railway, a tunnel was constructed about 200 ft (61 m) below the summit. In 1945, the old Tennessee Pass Tunnel was replaced by a newer tunnel. In recent times, the Rio Grande's Tennessee Pass line was the highest active mainline railroad mountain pass in the United States. The line, now owned by the Union Pacific Railroad (UP), is currently out of use but the tracks remain in place.

Once the Moffat Tunnel and Dotsero Cutoff were constructed, the line through Tennessee Pass became a secondary route. The Moffat Tunnel route had a maximum grade of 2%. The western approach to Tennessee Pass has grades up to 3%. However, the eastern approach has a maximum grade of only 1.4%.

The acquisition of the Southern Pacific by the DRGW in 1988 made Tennessee Pass once again the preferred transcontinental route. SP had a central route from California through to Kansas via Donner Pass, Tennessee Pass and trackage rights on the former Missouri Pacific route from Pueblo, Colorado into Kansas. The Moffat Tunnel route was kept in use.

On November 22, 1994, a Southern Pacific train loaded with Taconite pellets, which had departed from Wisconsin and was bound for the Geneva Steel mill near Provo, Utah, derailed on a curve near Minturn while descending the western slope of the Pass; fortunately, there were no fatalities. While the lead locomotive remained intact and on the tracks, the other three locomotives and 51 of the 54 cars loaded with Taconite pellets derailed. Of the crew members, the engineer, upon seeing the imminent derailment, jumped from the cab and survived, though he suffered a broken leg, while the conductor, who had remained in the locomotive, was rescued unharmed. The night before the derailment, while the train was at the Pueblo yard, it had been hooked up to the yard's ground air system to charge the brakes. Unbeknownst to the crew scheduled to operate that train, that yard air system had high levels of moisture in it. The train departed without incident from Pueblo to west, but as it climbed the eastern slopes of the Pass toward the summit, and due to the sub-zero temperatures that night, the moisture trapped in the locomotives’ brake systems condensed and froze, forming an ice plug. As the train began its descent from Pass summit to Dotsero, the brake systems failed due to the ice buildup, causing it to dangerously pick up speed. Despite their efforts to slow the train, the crew was powerless to stop it, and the out-of-control train derailed at nearly 60 mph.

On February 21, 1996, shortly before the merger with Union Pacific was completed, a SP freight train, consisting of 82 cars loaded hazardous materials westbound derailed while descending the western slope of the pass. In the accident, both the engineer and an engineering student were killed. The conductor, who was riding in one of the auxiliary locomotives, survived. In addition, there was a major spill of more than 51,000 gallons of Sulfuric acid and nearly 20,000 gallons of Triethylene glycol.

Investigations by the National Transportation Safety Board (NTSB) determined that the locomotives’ braking systems were functioning perfectly; it is therefore presumed that the engineering student, due to his inexperience in operating on mountainous terrain, failed to apply the brakes correctly during the descent, causing the train to dangerously accelerate. The conductor, who survived the accident because he was riding in one of the auxiliary locomotives, stated that the engineer, in a desperate attempt to prevent the derailment, took control of the controls and tried to apply the emergency brake.

In 1996, Union Pacific bought SP. Union Pacific preferred the Moffat Tunnel for routing traffic. The last revenue train went over the Tennessee Pass on August 23, 1997. Soon after UP ran this last train, they applied to the Surface Transportation Board for permission to abandon the line.

The 12 mi (19 km) of the Tennessee Pass line through the Royal Gorge is currently operated by the Royal Gorge Route Railroad, who operates excursion trains out of Cañon City.

On July 10, 2012, part of the old tunnel collapsed, creating a sinkhole that damaged U.S. Highway 24 and forced its temporary closure between Redcliff and Leadville. The newer tunnel was not damaged.

A report released by the Colorado Department of Transportation on September 4, 2014 stated the following about the line:

...The Tennessee Pass line has been identified as significant to CDOT because of its potential to carry both passengers and freight, and because it is the only existing trans-mountain alternative in Colorado to the Moffat Tunnel line, which often runs near capacity. The Tennessee Pass Line may be able to be used as an alternate route as trans-mountain rail demand grows due to increased development on the Western Slope or if the Moffat Tunnel were damaged or closed for any reason. Such an event would have a significant impact on Colorado, particularly on the Western Slope, since the railroads would be forced to move freight through Wyoming. The Royal Gorge Route Railroad currently offers scenic, tourist rail trips on 12 miles of the Tennessee Pass Line west of Cañon City. No freight has been shipped on the Tennessee Pass Line since 1997.

Union Pacific began actively discussing the sale of the line to Colorado Pacific in 2019, for an amount of $10 million. Colorado Pacific wanted to pay only the $8.8 million that the line was valued at. After a long battle in court, the ICC declared that they would not force a sale, but if other evidence was found, Colorado Pacific could re-file the report. As of October 2020, Colorado Pacific attempted another forced sale, this time saying they would run passenger/excursion service over the route. Union Pacific responded by stating they were in active negotiations for Rio Grande Pacific to operate the line and were opposed to Colorado Pacific's bid. On December 31, 2020 Rio Grande Pacific subsidiary Colorado, Midland & Pacific Railway Company, announced it had entered in an agreement with Union Pacific to explore reopening, leasing and operating the line for both potential commuter and freight services.

The route has been at the center of controversy because, with the construction of the Railroad to Uinta Basin in Utah, the eventual increase in the number of trains loaded with waxy-crude oil in the Central Corridor is expected to generate pressure that will lead to the reopening of the Tennessee Pass Subdivision to relieve pressure on the Moffat Tunnel Sub. The route through Tennessee Pass is more direct, avoiding the longer route via Moffat Tunnel, Denver and the UP–BNSF Joint Line to Pueblo, where trains enter BNSF trackage rights, bound for Gulf Coast refineries. Rio Grande Pacific refuted claims they would operate oil trains on the pass, with public statements their interests in the line are only in local freight and exploring potential commuter rail service.

Both Eagle County and environmental groups lobbied to put the project on hold, citing the potential risks of increased oil train traffic both in the Central Corridor and eventually through Tennessee Pass. One of the major concerns that both Eagle County and environmental groups indicated is that if a major derailment were to occur on the Central Corridor or Tennessee Pass route with a resulting oil spill, the environmental consequences to the Colorado River (which runs adjacent to the Central Corridor rail tracks), or the Arkansas River, which runs adjacent to the Tennessee Pass tracks, would be catastrophic. Eagle County's opposition to the Uintah Basin project led to the Supreme Court ruling Seven County Infrastructure Coalition v. Eagle County focused on an appeal court's interpretation of the National Environmental Policy Act which had paused the Uinta Basin Rail project. In an 8-0 ruling, the court ruled against Eagle County, citing that potential environmental impacts there from the Utah rail project on rail traffic outside of the Uinta Basin line itself, is outside the scope of an environmental impact statement as outlined according to NEPA.

Passenger rail service has been proposed along the line.

== Water diversion ==
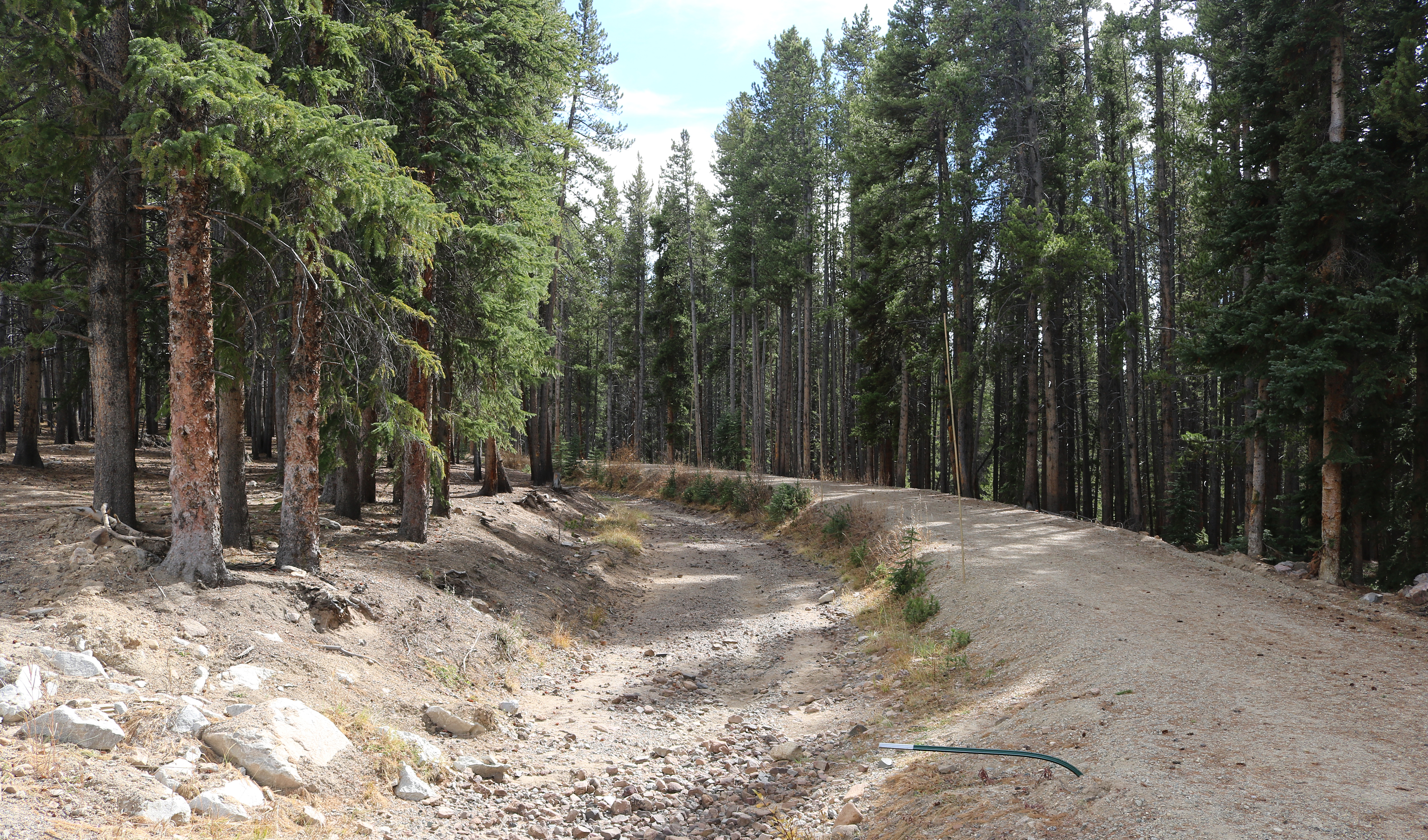
The ditch at the pass in October 2020, after it was shut down for the winter

Tennessee Pass is the location of the first transbasin diversion project to move water from the Colorado River Basin over the continental divide to the Arkansas River. The 1.5-mile (2.4 km) Ewing Placer Ditch (or just Ewing Ditch) was constructed in 1880 and remains in use. It transfers water from Piney Creek east of the pass, a tributary of the Eagle River over the pass to the head of Tennessee Creek. The ditch may have originally been used to provide water for placer mining, but the Otero Canal Company used the water for irrigation before selling the ditch to the Pueblo Board of Water Works in 1955. The ditch has a capacity of 18.5 cubic feet per second (0.52 m^{3}/s) and in an average year diverts approximately 1,000 acre-feet (1.2×10^{6} m^{3}).

A second ditch was constructed at Tennessee pass in 1929, the 6-mile (9.7 km) Wurts Ditch. This was built by William Wurts to provide irrigation water, but Pueblo purchased this ditch in 1938, and in 1953, they extended the ditch another 6.5 miles (10.5 km) westward along the south flank of the Eagle River valley. After extension, the ditch has a capacity of 100 cubic feet per second (2.8 m^{3}/s) and diverts an average of about 2,700 acre-feet (3.3×10^{6} m^{3}) of water.

== See also ==
- List of railroad crossings of the North American continental divide
  - Yellowhead Pass, the Canadian Northern crossing
  - Kicking Horse Pass, the Canadian Pacific's first crossing
  - Marias Pass, the Great Northern crossing
  - Mullan Pass, the Northern Pacific's first crossing
  - Creston, Wyoming, the Union Pacific's first crossing
  - Campbell Pass, the Santa Fe's crossing
  - Wilna, New Mexico, the Southern Pacific's crossing
- Treasure: In Search of the Golden Horse
