= Del squared =

Del squared may refer to:

- Laplace operator, a differential operator often denoted by the symbol ∇^{2}
- Hessian matrix, sometimes denoted by ∇^{2}
- Aitken's delta-squared process, a numerical analysis technique used for accelerating the rate of convergence of a sequence

== See also ==
- DEL2, the second tier ice hockey league in Germany
- Del, a vector calculus differential operator
- Nabla symbol, the symbol used for the Del operator
- ∂, the partial derivative operator symbol
- Del (disambiguation)
