= Cromwell Dixon =

Early American aviator

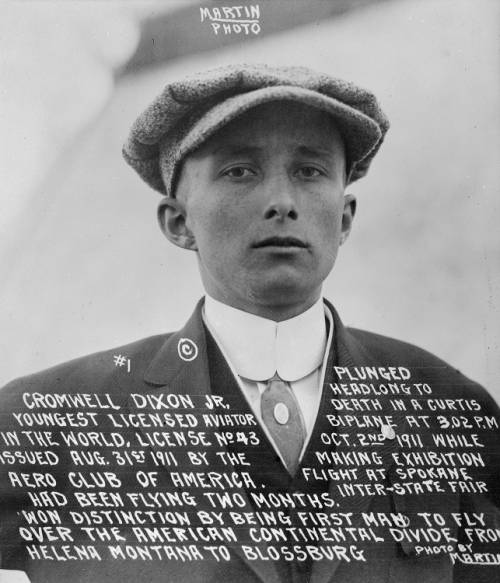
- Born: July 9, 1892; San Francisco, California, US
- Died: October 2, 1911 (aged 19); Spokane, Washington, US
- Resting place: Green Lawn Cemetery; Columbus, Ohio
- Occupation: Aviator
- Known for: First person to fly across the Continental Divide

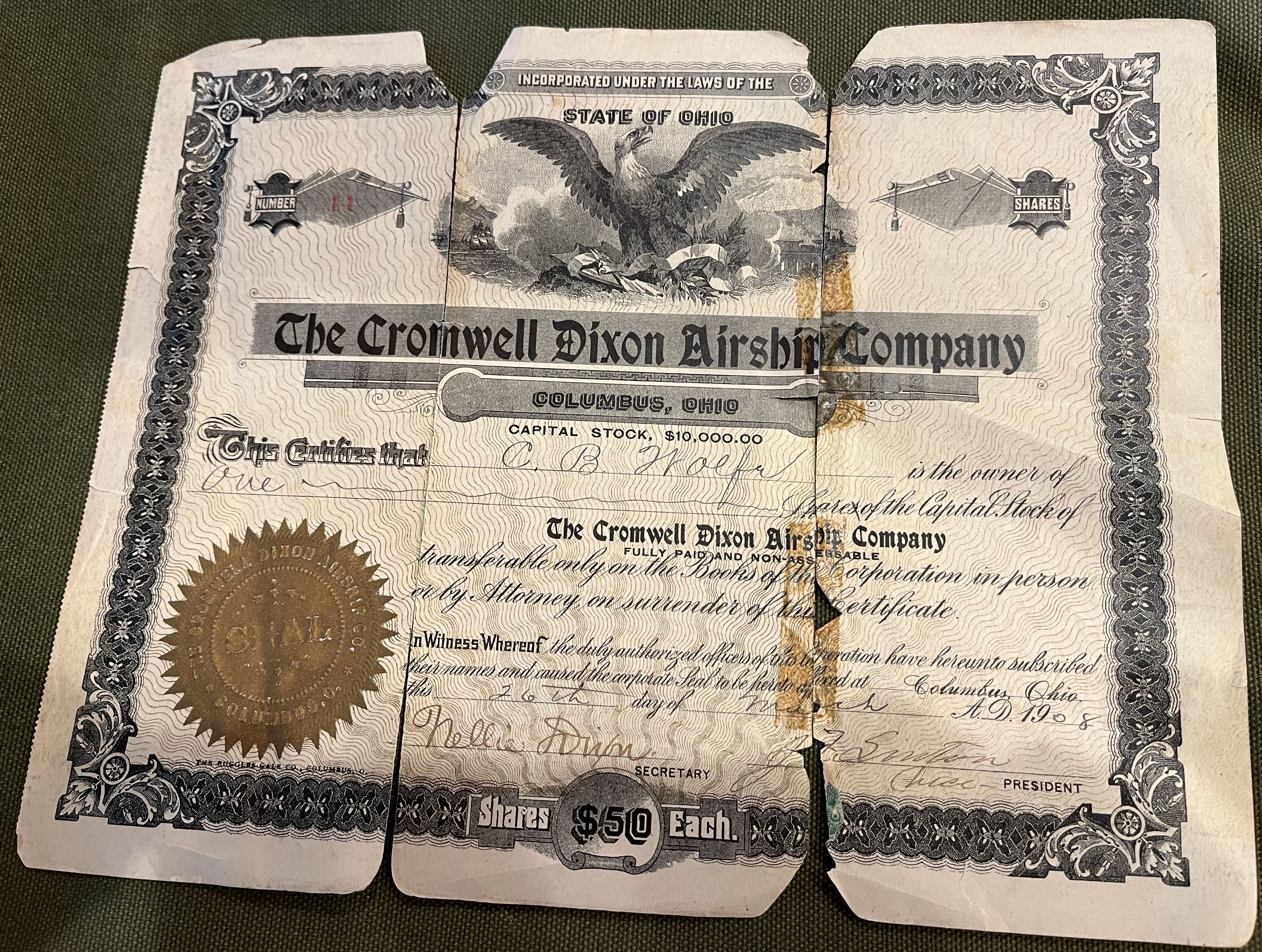
The Cromwell Dixon Airship Company

Cromwell Dixon (July 9, 1892 – October 2, 1911) was an American teenage dirigible pilot and aviator. He became the first person to fly an airplane across the Continental Divide in September 1911 when he flew fifteen miles over Mullan Pass.

== Life ==
=== Early life ===
Cromwell Dixon was born in San Francisco July 9, 1892, to Annie and Charles P. Dixon. His father died the next year. With another child on the way, Annie moved to Columbus, Ohio, where she kept her little family together and made a living by renting out rooms and taking in sewing. From an early age, Dixon showed a knack for mechanics. A family story said that he took a clock apart when he was only one year old. As a boy, he built clockwork-powered toys—a fish and a small boat that he sailed on a lake. At the age of ten, Dixon invented a roller coaster for the neighborhood kids; in 1903 he built his own motorcycle. Local newspapers took an interest in Dixon's inventions and began publishing articles about the young inventor by the time he was twelve.

=== Aviation ===
When he was 14, Dixon visited the Louisiana Purchase Exposition in St. Louis. The fair featured two buildings devoted to aviation exhibits, and Dixon was enthralled. A family friend later remembered that Dixon "could hardly be induced to leave the two buildings devoted to airships." Within a year, he began work on his own airship. After getting advice from A. Roy Knabenshue at the Ohio State Fair in Columbus, Dixon scrapped his first design, which would have used a gasoline-powered engine under a hydrogen balloon. Dixon redesigned his dirigible and completed it in 1907. It featured a thirty-two-foot gas bag made of silk and coated with varnish. Dixon attached a bicycle frame to the bag and geared the sprocket wheel to a propeller. Ropes attached the handlebars to a rudder made of bamboo and silk. To fill the gas bag, he made his own hydrogen generator out of a wooden barrel full of iron filings and sulfuric acid. A second barrel filled with lime or potash filtered the gas. Dixon named his airship the Moon and made his first flight on June 10, 1907. The Columbus Dispatch reported, "It was his first flight, his first trial, in fact, and the little airship, propelled by foot power after the fashion of a bicycle, which the youthful protege of the great Knabenshue built with his own hands, responded to every touch of the enthusiastic lad as he manipulated it gracefully at an altitude of 200 feet for more than an hour before 500 shouting and excited spectators." After this success, Dixon scheduled an exhibition on June 28 and charged 25 cents admission. According to the newspaper, thousands attended. A promoter noticed Dixon's success and scheduled him to make daily flights for the week of July fourth. After each flight, Dixon tethered his Moon to an open-air stage where his sister Lulu performed a vaudeville act. While she performed, he pedaled the dirigible across the stage behind her. Unfortunately, the Moon was destroyed when a fire, ignited by a firecracker, swept across the park.

Dixon quickly built another airship, which he named the Sky-cycle, and flew it for crowds at Olentangy Park. In October 1907, Dixon was invited to participate in the International Aeronautic Tournament at St. Louis. There he won first prize for dirigibles in the balloon race when he flew eight miles and crossed the Mississippi River on the way. Newspapers dubbed him "the youngest aeronaut in the world." After this success, he issued stocks to finance a mechanical version of his dirigible. On his seventeenth birthday, he flew in a self-made dirigible balloon over Dayton, Ohio. He continued to show his airships across the United States and Canada well into 1910. On September 4, 1910, he nearly crashed into the sea with his motor-powered dirigible when the engine failed at a height of 500 feet (150 m) during a flight at the Harvard aviation meet in Boston, Massachusetts. He eventually landed only 10 feet (3.0 m) from the water's edge.

By 1911, Dixon had switched to heavier-than-air craft, flying a Curtiss biplane, and he received his air pilot license (#43) on August 6, 1911. Aviator Glenn Curtiss was impressed with Dixon's skill and gave him a job in the Curtiss Exhibition Company. The company provided Dixon with a Curtiss "Pusher" plane, which he named Hummingbird. Dixon immediately embarked on a cross-country tour, traveling by train with his plane on a flatcar and stopping for performances in major cities. In September, he performed in his plane at the Helena, Montana fair. On the last day of the fair, he performed his most harrowing feat: an attempt to fly across the Continental Divide. No one had successfully crossed the divide in an airplane yet. Every aviator who had tried had died. His manager refused to allow him to try the dangerous trip until a $10,000 purse was raised. On September 30, Dixon flew from Helena to Blossburg, some 15 miles to the west, over the Mullan Pass. The flight took 26 minutes, and by completing it Dixon became the first aviator to cross the Continental Divide. The same day, he flew back to Helena. The return flight proved to be more difficult; Dixon had problems reaching the necessary altitude, and the flight took 43 minutes. His achievement earned him $10,000, presented to him by Governor Edwin L. Norris.

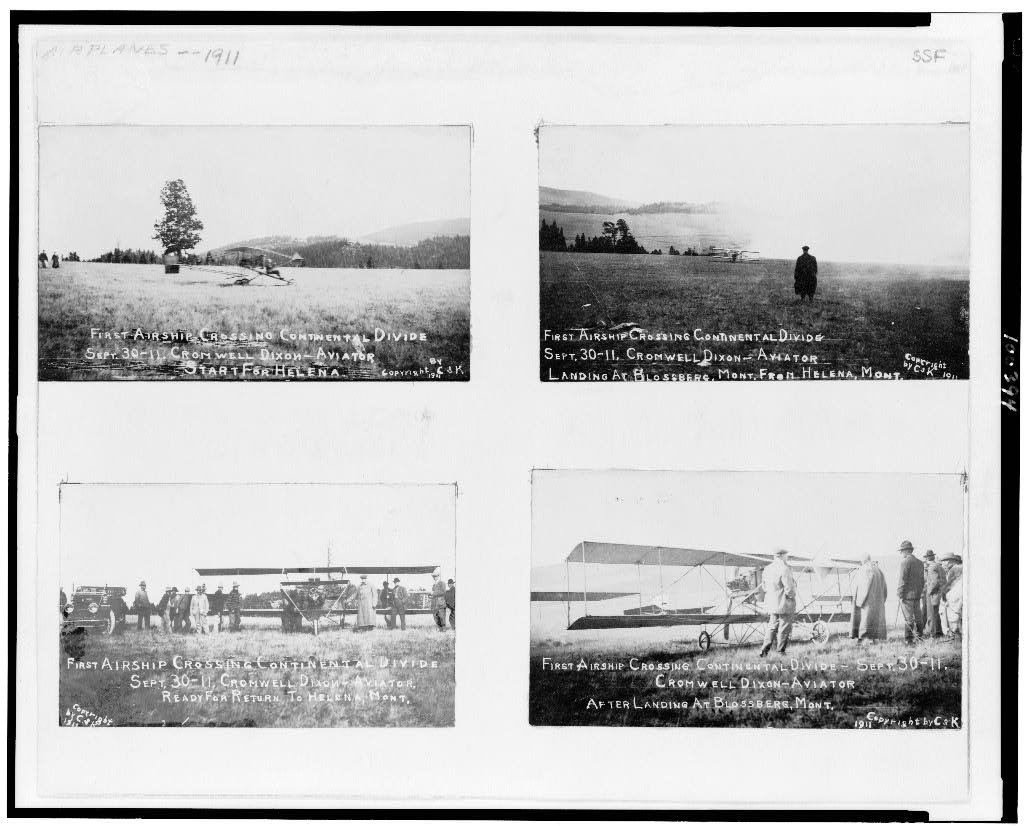

== Death ==
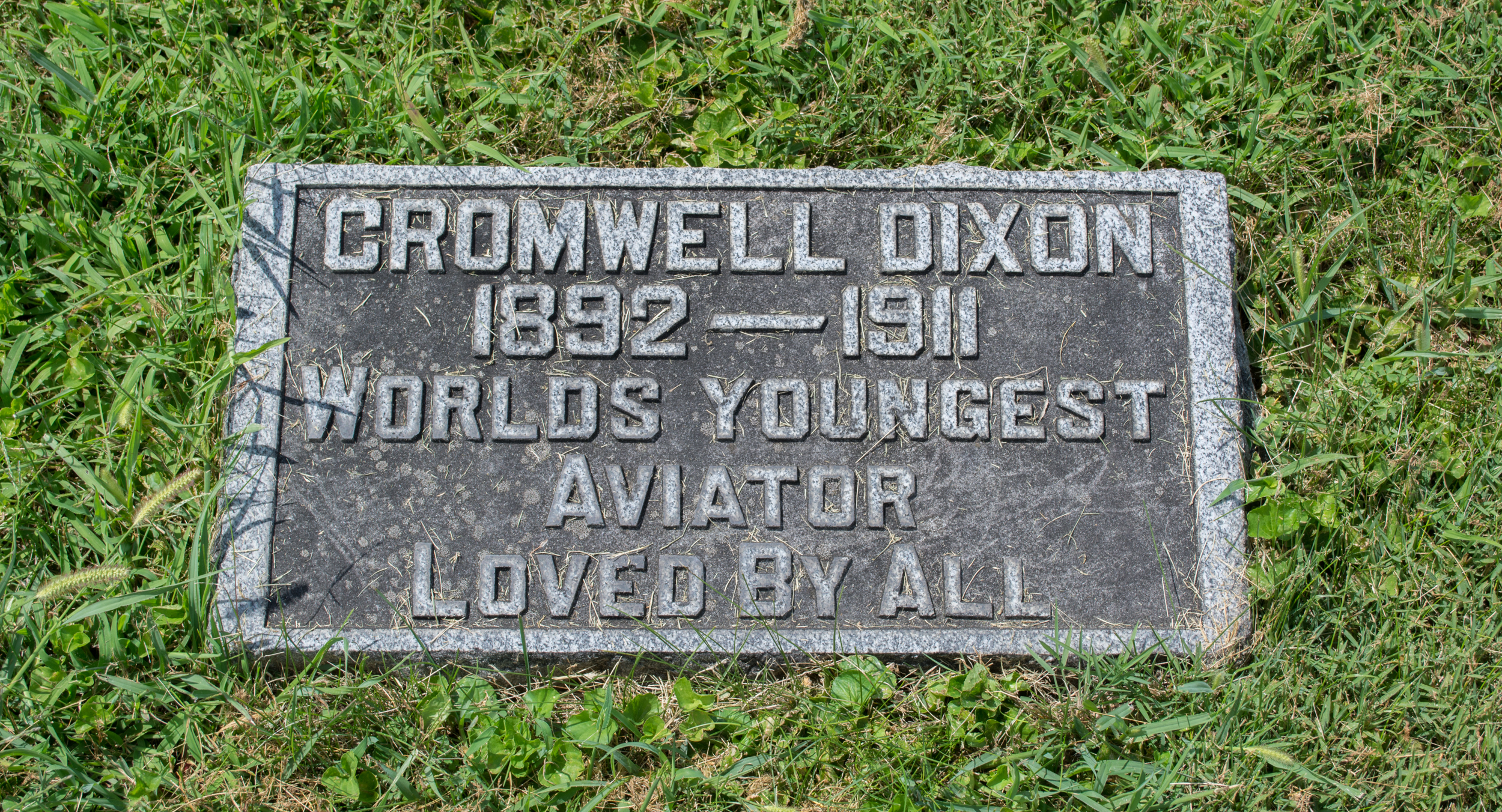
Cromwell Dixon's grave at Green Lawn

Dixon died two days later, in Spokane, Washington at the Interstate Fair. Billed as the youngest licensed aviator in the United States, he made his first flight of the day at 3pm, after having had some engine trouble. Flying his biplane in front of 12,000 spectators, the plane fell from 100 feet (30 m) into the Northern Pacific railroad cut north of the fairgrounds because of a strong downwind. Some of his injuries include: a fractured skull, collarbone facture, severe leg injuries, maybe a radiator impact, and internal crushing. He died less than an hour later in the hospital.

Interment was made in the Green Lawn Cemetery, at Dixon's hometown of Columbus, Ohio. His epitaph reads "Cromwell Dixon, World's Youngest Aviator, Loved By All."

== Legacy ==
A monument commemorating his historic Continental Divide flight was erected at the Montana State Fairgrounds in October 1912, but it was moved a few times over the years. It was finally placed in Morrison Park, southwest of the Helena Regional Airport, on October 6, 2009. The week before, September 30 was declared "Cromwell Dixon Day" by the Lewis and Clark County Commissioners.

Cromwell Dixon Drive in Helena is named after him, as well as Cromwell Dixon Campground on MacDonald Pass, near Blossburg. In the field at Blossburg, a bronze plaque on a rock monument commemorates Dixon's landing.

== See also ==
- List of firsts in aviation
