= Homestake Pass =

Mountain Pass in Montana

- Marker placed along the former Northern Pacific Railway's crossing of Homestake Pass.
- Interactive map of Homestake Pass
- Elevation: 6,329 ft (1,929 m)
- Traversed by: I-90; BNSF Railway (inactive)

Third Approach
- Location: Jefferson / Silver Bow counties, Montana, US
- Range: Rocky Mountains
- Coordinates: 45°55.3′N 112°25.2′W

Homestake Pass is a mountain pass in the Rocky Mountains of Montana in the United States. It sits on the Continental Divide on the border between Jefferson County and Silver Bow County, six miles south-southeast of Butte in Beaverhead-Deerlodge National Forest at an elevation of 6,329 feet (1,929 m). The pass carries Interstate 90 across the Continental Divide and is the highest point on the 3,020-mile (4,860 km) highway.

== History ==
The pass was discovered by Edwin Harrison McHenry, a civil engineer working for the Northern Pacific Railway, who was tasked with locating a route for the NP from the main line near Logan, Montana through to Butte. The line over the pass from Logan to Garrison, Montana via Butte became the Rocky Mountain Division, Second and Fourth Subdivisions, built in 1889. This was Northern Pacific's scenic transcontinental passenger train route used by the famous North Coast Limited and its Amtrak successor, the North Coast Hiawatha, which was discontinued in 1979.

The line over the pass is currently owned by BNSF Railway. It has been inactive since 1983, as its grades and curvature are poorly suited to freight trains, which utilize the former Northern Pacific's easier route via Helena, crossing the Mullan Pass. It is unknown if that the rail line over the pass will ever be used again, but BNSF has resisted tearing out the line because the original lease with the Northern Pacific and the US Forest Service requires that the grade be returned to its original status, a very costly process.

In 2022, when the termination of the Montana Rail Link lease was announced with the resulting resumption of BNSF operations on the tracks previously leased from MRL, there was speculation that one of the steps BNSF might take to increase traffic capacity on the MRL route would be to re-open Homestake Pass route to set up directional running from Garrison to Logan. This would entail eastbound and southbound empty (mainly coal and grains) trains using the steeper and windier Homestake route and loaded northwestbound trains would tackle current route through Helena across Mullan Pass.

When Interstate 90 was built in the 1960s, the state government chose Homestake Pass to cross the Continental Divide, providing an easier alternative to the U.S. Route 10 route over the Divide at Pipestone Pass. The freeway opened in August 1966 after two years of construction and was the second section of the Interstate Highway System to cross the Continental Divide.

A trail running race currently takes place annually on the Continental Divide Trail between Homestake Pass and Pipestone Pass. Hosted by Butte's Piss and Moan Running Club, the Wulfman CDT 14k is held on the Saturday closest to the Summer solstice.

== See also ==
- List of railroad crossings of the North American continental divide
- Mountain passes in Montana
