= O'Dell =

O'Dell is an English surname originating from the village Odell in Bedfordshire, England. Folk etymology gave it a misleading Irish O'Dell spelling. Some families anglicized their name over time.

Notable people with the surname include (in alphabetical order):

- Billy O'Dell (1933–2018), American baseball player
- Cricket O'Dell, fictional character from Archie Comics
- Diane O'Dell (born 1953), American serial killer
- Jack O'Dell (1923–2019), American civil rights activist
- Kenny O'Dell (1944–2018), American country music singer and songwriter
- Nancy O'Dell (born 1966), American television host and entertainment journalist
- Patrick O'Dell (born 1938), American award-winning cinematographer for CBS News
- Rick O'Dell (born 1948), American racing driver
- Scott O'Dell (1898–1989), American children's author
- Tom O'Dell (born 1990), American television host
- Tony O'Dell (born 1960), American actor
- Walden O'Dell (active since 2003), American businessman

== See also ==
- Odell (surname)
- Odell (given name)
- Dell (name), given name and surname
