= Diana Dell =

Russian film actress

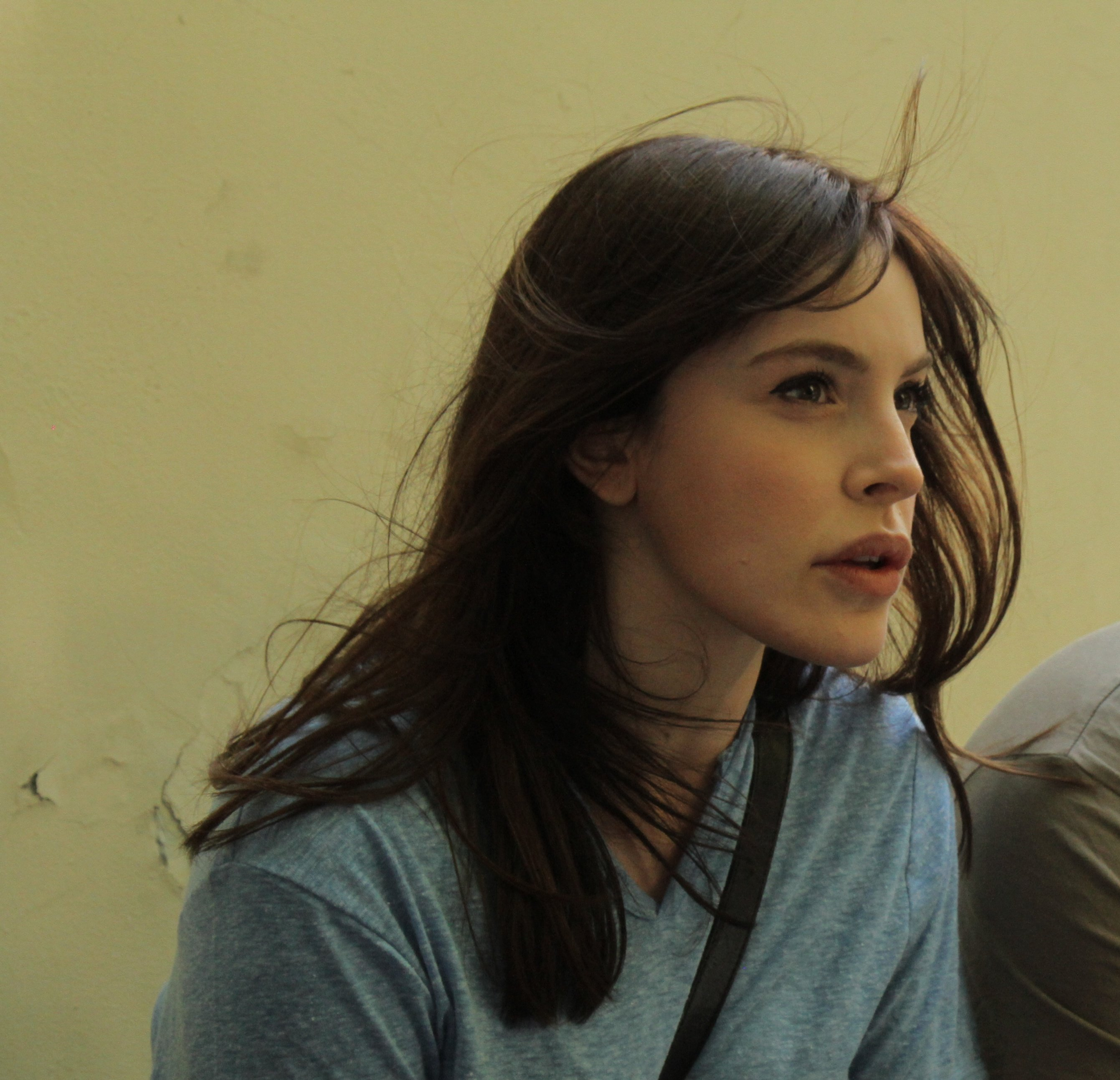
- Diana Dall on the set of the film Entropiya.
- Born: April 11, 1982 (age 43); Grozny, RSFSR, USSR
- Citizenship: Russia
- Occupation: Actress
- Years active: 2006–present

Diana Dell (Russian: Диа́на Дэлль; born 11 April 1982) is a Russian film actress.

== Biography ==
Dell was born in Grozny, RSFSR, USSR (now Chechen Republic, Russia). She trained as a lawyer, then graduated from a private school of performing arts in London.

Diana played her first leading role in 2008 in the movie Sny? (Dreams?) directed by Vladimir Raksha. Sny? became Russia's first Internet movie premiere and Diana's part of the mysterious beautiful Dasha drew the attention of the audiences.

On February 14, 2013, Entropiya (Enthropy) directed by Mariya Saakyan was released in Russia. The movie was produced by Julia Mishkinene (the producer of Shultes and The Hunter - films of the acclaimed Russian director Bakur Bakuradze).

In Entropiya Diana Dell played one of the main characters – the actress Masha.

The well-known Russian TV host Kseniya Sobchak, acclaimed film director Valeriya Gai Germanika, fashion model Danila Polyakov, and actor Evgeniy Tsyganov became Diana's partners in this movie.

Diana Dell about Entropiya: "It was a parody on a popular Russian reality-show Dom-2. All actors had to behave as in life."

In 2012, the movie Entropiya was included in the official program of the XX Window to Europe film festival (the prize "For Creative Search" was won by the director Mariya Saakyan).

Dell is a staunch opponent of animal murder. She does not eat any meat, seafood, or fish.

== Filmography ==
Actor
| Title | Year | Role |
|---|---|---|
| Entropiya | 2012 | Actress Masha |
| Persian Garden | 2009 | Actress |
| Sny? | 2008 | Dasha |
| Liteiny, 4 (TV series) | 2008 | Larisa |
| Bus (TV series) | 2007 | Irina |
| Women | 2006 | Italian girl |
