= John Henry Dell =

English painter (1830–1888)

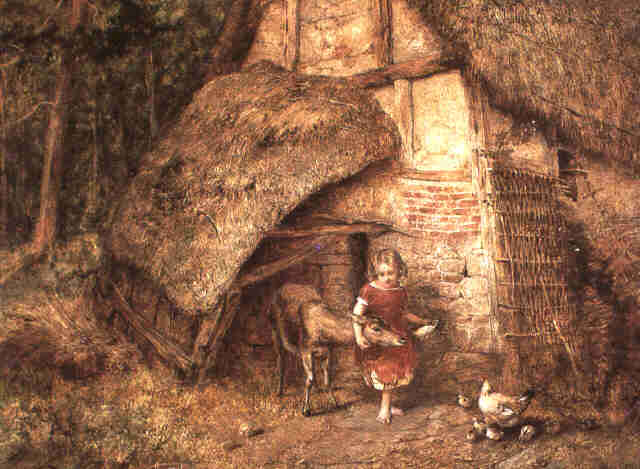
Feeding Time (1860)

John Henry Dell (1830–1888) was an English landscape artist and illustrator. He was a regular exhibitor at the British Institution and the Royal academy.

== Selected works ==
- Cottagers
- Feeding Time (1860)
