= William Lafayette Darling =

American civil engineer (1856–1938)

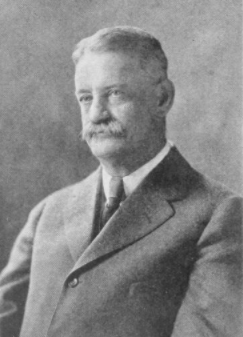
- Born: March 24, 1856; Oxford, Massachusetts
- Died: October 27, 1938 (aged 82); St. Paul, Minnesota
- Education: Worcester Polytechnic Institute 1877
- Occupation: Civil engineer
- Employer(s): Northern Pacific Railroad; Great Northern Railway; Chicago, Burlington and Quincy Railroad; Chicago, Milwaukee, St. Paul and Pacific Railway; U.S. Government
- Title: Chief engineer, consulting engineer, Doctor of Engineering
- Political party: Republican
- Board member of: Associate member, Naval Consulting Board; Advisory Commission of Railway Experts to Russia; Board of Economics and Engineering for the Owners of Railroad Securities; City Planning Board, St. Paul, Minnesota; City Zoning Board, St. Paul, Minnesota
- Spouse: Alice Ernestine Bevans
- Children: Fayette Bevans, William Lowell, Edna Cyrena
- Parent(s): William Edward and Cynthia Marana (Steers) Darling

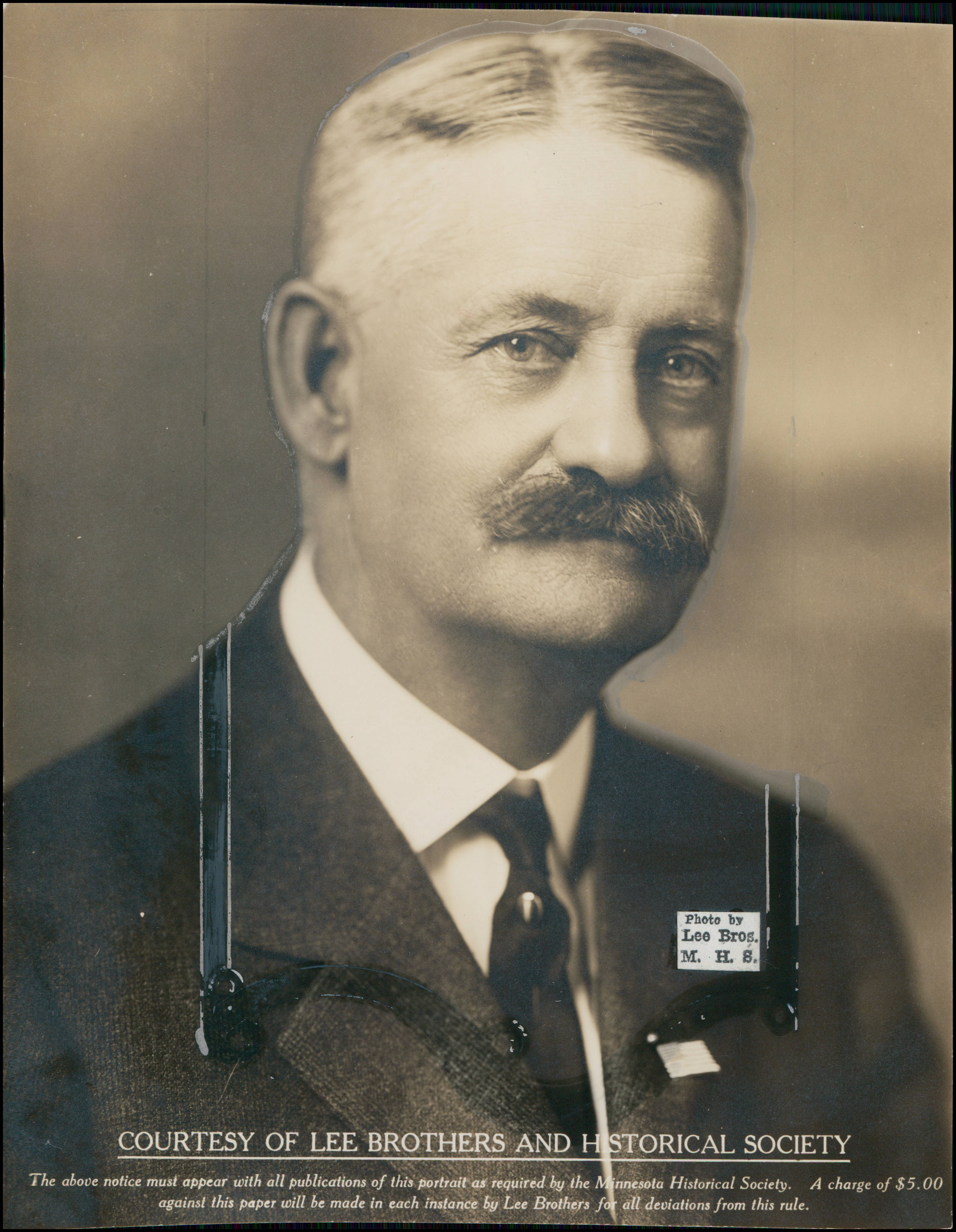
Darling in 1917

William Lafayette Darling (1856–1938) was a consulting engineer in St. Paul, Minnesota.

== Early life and education ==
William Lafayette Darling was born in Oxford, Massachusetts, on March 24, 1856. He received a Bachelor of Science in 1877 at the Worcester Polytechnic Institute, where he lettered in baseball and football. He became a Doctor of Engineering in 1927.

== Career ==
Entered engineering construction in the Northern Pacific Railroad between 1879 and 1883 as a division engineer, St. Paul and Northern Pacific (now Northern Pacific), 1883 to 1884; engineer, Chicago, Burlington and Quincy, 1884; engineer, location and construction, St. Andrews Bay and Chipley, 1884 to 1885; resident engineer in charge of terminals in St. Paul and Minneapolis, Chicago, Burlington and Northern (now Chicago, Burlington and Quincy), 1885 to 1887; engineer, location and construction, Duluth, Watertown and Pacific (now Great Northern Railway), 1887; located the line afterwards built by the Great Northern from Sioux Falls to Yankton, South Dakota, 1887 to 1888; engineer in charge of washout repairs from Minot, North Dakota, to Great Falls, Montana, Great Northern, 1888. The following positions with the Northern Pacific: in charge of construction of Howe truss bridge[s] in Montana, 1888 to 1889; in charge of location and construction of line from Little Falls to Staples, Minnesota, 1889; in charge of location and construction of the Coeur d'Alene Branch, 1889 to 1890; principal assistant engineer in charge of engineering and construction, 1891 to 1892; division engineer in charge of engineering from St. Paul, Minnesota, to Billings, Montana, 1892 to 1896; division engineer and assistant chief engineer, 1896 to 1901; chief engineer, 1901 to 1903. Chief engineer and vice-president, Gulf Construction Company, building a line from St. Louis to Kansas City, 1905; chief engineer, Pacific Railway (now Chicago, Milwaukee, St. Paul and Pacific Railroad), 1905 to 1906; chief engineer, Northern Pacific system and allied lines and during same period was vice-president and construction engineer in charge of construction of the Portland and Seattle Railway (now Spokane, Portland and Seattle), also during this period was construction engineer of the Pittsburgh and Gilmore.

In 1916 he became a consulting engineer at St. Paul, with the following activities: associate member, Naval Consulting Board during World War I; appointed a member of the Advisory Commission of Railway Experts to Russia by the Secretary of State, 1917; Member of Board of Economics and Engineering for the Owners of Railroad Securities in New York, 1921 to 1922. Public office: Member, City Planning Board, St. Paul; Member, City Zoning Board, St. Paul.

In 1926, the Trustees of the Worcester Polytechnic Institute established the policy of granting a limited number of honorary degrees, including Doctor of Engineering. In 1927, the degree was conferred upon William L. Darling.

== Personal life ==
Darling married Alice Ernestine Bevans on April 15, 1901, and they had three children.

He died in St. Paul on October 27, 1938.

== Clubs and fraternities ==
Member American Railway Engineering Association (former director); American Society of Civil Engineers; Permanent Association of Navigation Congresses; General Contractors of America (honorary member); Minnesota Club, St. Paul; University Club, St. Paul; Thirty-second degree Mason; Shriner.
