= Odell Hill =

Coordinates: 42.7734120°N 73.3345549°W

Odell Hill is a summit in the U.S. state of New York. The elevation is 1,257 feet (383 m).

Odell Hill was named in 1790 after Simeon Odell.
