= The Dell, Leamington Spa =

Urban park in Leamington Spa, Warwickshire, England

Coordinates: 52°17′33″N 1°32′33″W

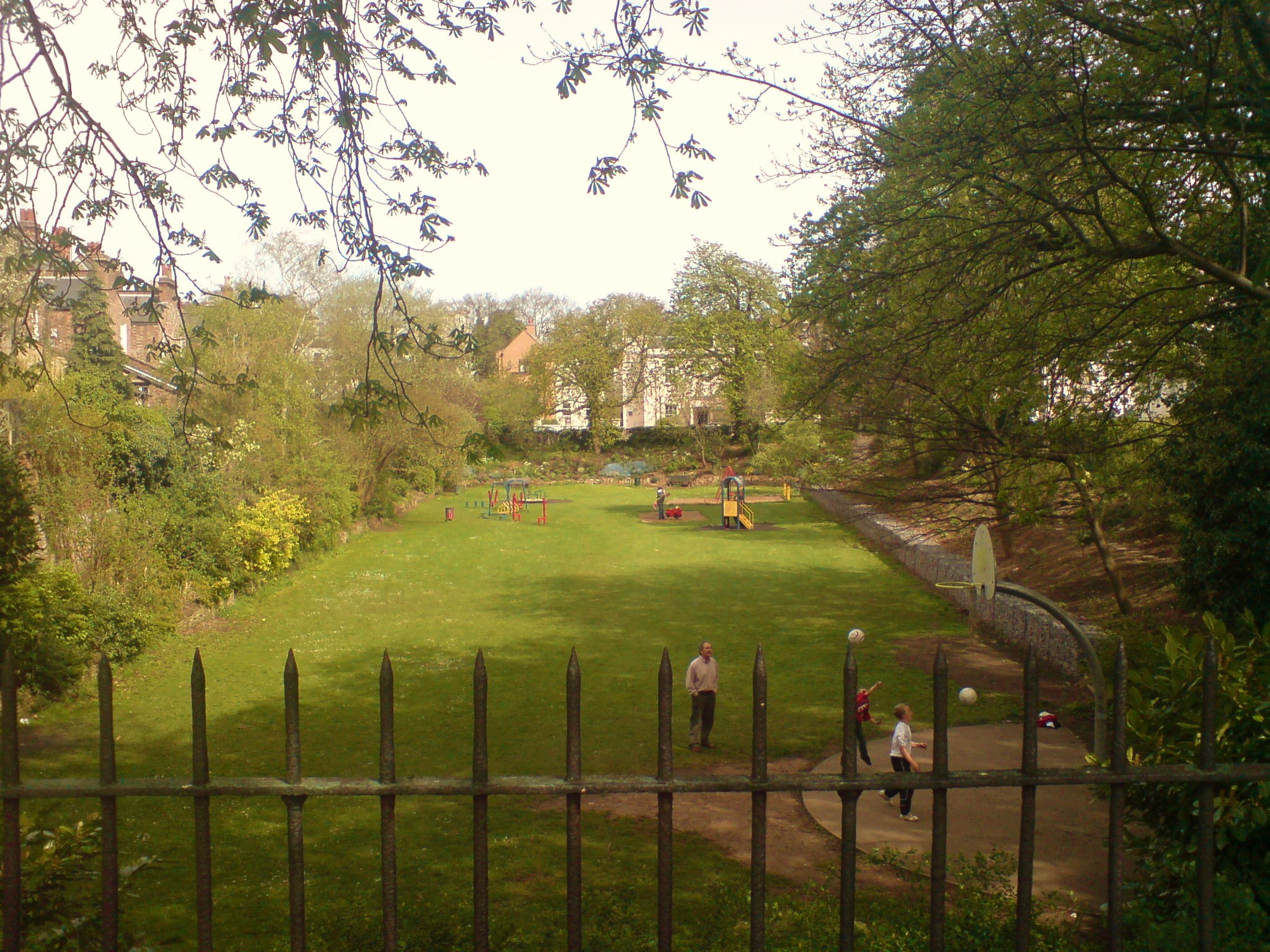
The Dell today. Note the numerous items of children's play equipment.

The Dell is a small park in the Milverton area of Leamington Spa, Warwickshire, England. Although it is not well known nationally (like The Jephson Gardens) or regionally (like Newbold Comyn), it is a well used and popular park amongst Leamingtonians themselves. The park takes its name from the fact that it is situated in a small sunken hollow, or dell.

== History ==
Up until the 1820s, the Dell was simply part of the course of a local watercourse, the Bins Brook. As the town grew, however, a new road was needed to connect the town to its neighbour Warwick. The brook was culverted and the road built higher up to avoid the often muddy ground. There was once a small summer house made from the stones of a demolished local church in the park, but it has now itself disappeared. Like another Leamington park, Newbold Comyn, the land stayed in private hands until the Leamington Corporation bought it in 1945. Flowerbeds and paths were laid out in a formal style in the early years but eventually they were grassed over for economic reasons. From the 1970s to late 1990s the park became slightly infamous. Gangs of youths would sometimes gather there, as would drug users.

== Renaissance ==
However, since the formation in 1997, of Friends of the Dell, and in 2006, the Gardening Around Leamington Spa (GALS) group, who have helped the Warwick District Council maintain the park, its good name has returned. Friends of the Dell hold regular parties in the park, the most popular being the ones in early summer and Halloween. In the early 2000s the somewhat ageing children's play equipment was upgraded thanks to a council grant. In May 2007, GALS received a £500 donation from Barclays to help weed the steep slopes of the park. In late 2007, the east slope of the park was reinforced with rock filled gabions placed at its foot. In March 2011, there was more great news for The Friends of The Dell when they learnt that the nationwide "Big Lottery Fund" had granted them £50,000. Plans to spend the money include a hard path across the park to allow better access for the disabled as well as improved play equipment, new railings and an information board at the entrance.

There are now, as there have been since the 1940s and before, shops around the Dell named after it such as Dell News (newsagents), Dell Practice (doctor's surgery) and The Dell Guesthouse.
