= Logan, Montana =

- Unincorporated community
- Location within Montana Location within the United States
- Coordinates: 45°53′04″N 111°25′25″W
- Country: United States
- State: Montana
- County: Gallatin

Area
  - Total: 0.51 sq mi (1.33 km^{2})
  - Land: 0.50 sq mi (1.29 km^{2})
  - Water: 0.015 sq mi (0.04 km^{2})
- Elevation: 4,275 ft (1,303 m)

Population (2020)
  - Total: 72
  - Density: 144.2/sq mi (55.69/km^{2})
- Time zone: UTC-7 (Mountain (MST))
  - Summer (DST): UTC-7 (MDT)
- FIPS code: 30-44500
- GNIS feature ID: 2583825

Logan is an unincorporated community in Gallatin County, Montana, United States. As of the 2020 census, Logan had a population of 72. Logan can be accessed via exit 283 on Interstate 90.

== History ==
Logan is situated on the Gallatin River and was established in 1889 as a railroad station on the Northern Pacific and Montana (later the Northern Pacific Railway, Burlington Northern, and Montana Rail Link.) It is now operated by BNSF Railway.

During construction period the settlement was referred to as Canyon House, due to a house of that name which was here at that time. The name of Logan was adopted on November 26, 1889. The name is in honor of Captain William Logan, who came to Montana in 1872, taking part in General Baker’s campaign against the Indians in 1872 to 1876.

In 1877, Captain Logan accompanied General Gibbon on the expedition which resulted in the Battle of the Big Hole on August 9, 1877, where he met his death. His wife’s name was Miss Odelia Furlong.

It is noted that [the] right-of-way of the Northern Pacific here was acquired from Odelia Logan. The owners of the town site were William D. Flowers and Mary E. Flowers. Their certificate is dated October 20, 1892. The plat was filed on June 10, 1893.

Logan was an important junction on the Northern Pacific's Rocky Mountain Division, where westbound trains could diverge north to the line to Helena, Montana and Mullan Pass, or south to Butte, Montana, via Homestake Pass. In addition, the Northern Pacific operated a secondary freight-only line between Logan and Bozeman, Montana from the 1920s through the 1950s. This was eventually made redundant by the use of diesel locomotives such as the EMD FT on the Northern Pacific and the alternate route was subsequently removed.

Until the 1930s Logan was home to a six-stall roundhouse, as well as coal and water facilities which supported the Northern Pacific's steam locomotives. The roundhouse burned down in a fire in December, 1932, destroying or damaging at least three steam locomotives. Photographs of this event can be seen in the Ronald V. Nixon Collection at the Museum of the Rockies in Bozeman.

The call letters for Logan's telegraph office were CH. It was located approximately 1,120 miles from the NP's terminus in St. Paul, Minnesota. Its elevation is 4,087 feet.

== Demographics ==
Historical population
Census	Pop.	Note	%±
2020	72		—
U.S. Decennial Census

== Bibliography ==
- Northern Pacific Railway. "Place Names Manuscript," no date.
- Ronald V. Nixon Collection, Museum of the Rockies, Bozeman, Montana.
