= Odell (given name) =

Odell is an English unisex given name which may refer to:

- Odell Barnes (disambiguation), several people
- Odell Barry (1941–2022), American former football player
- Odell Beckham Jr. (born 1992), American National Football League player
- Odell Borg, an American native flute maker
- Odell Brown (1940–2011), American jazz organist
- Odell Haggins (born 1967), American college football coach and former National Football League player
- Odell Hale (1908–1980), American Major League Baseball player
- Odell Hodge, an American basketball player
- Odell Horton, a United States federal judge
- Odell Jones, a Major League Baseball pitcher
- Odell Manuel, New Zealand former professional rugby league footballer and Australian Powerlifting champion
- Odell McLeod, an American country-gospel singer
- Odell Murray, an Antigua and Barbudan international footballer
- O'dell Owens (1947-2022), American physician
- Odell Pollard, an American attorney
- Odell Shepard (1884–1967), American professor, poet, and politician, 1938 Pulitzer Prize winner
- Odell Stautzenberger (1924-2002), American football player
- Odell Thurman (born 1983), American former National Football League player
- Odell Waller (1917–1942), African-American sharecropper executed for fatally shooting his white landlord
- Odell Willis (born 1984), Canadian Football League player

== Fictional characters ==
- Odell Watkins, a fictional character played on the television series The Wire

== See also ==
- Odel Kamara (born 2003), English boxer
- Odel Offiah (born 2002), English footballer
- Odell (surname)
