= O'Dell, British Columbia =

- Railway Point
- Interactive map of O'Dell, British Columbia
- Coordinates: 54°16′00″N 122°38′00″W
- Country: Canada
- Province: British Columbia
- Regional District: Fraser-Fort George

O'Dell is a railway point on the British Columbia Railway north of Prince George, British Columbia.
