= Del (disambiguation) =

Del is a vector differential operator represented by the symbol ∇ (nabla).

Del or DEL can also refer to:

== Mathematics ==
- A name for the partial derivative symbol ∂
- Dynamic epistemic logic

== Abbreviations ==
- DEL or Del, for Delaware, one of the United States
- DEL or Del, for Delhi, the capital of India
- Del, for the constellation Delphinus
- Del., for a non-voting delegate to the United States House of Representatives

== People ==
- Del (given name), a list of people with the given name or nickname

== Fictional characters ==
- Del Boy, lead character in the BBC comedy series Only Fools and Horses
- Del Dingle, fictional character in the ITV soap opera Emmerdale
- Del, robot alligator villager from the video game series Animal Crossing

== Computing ==
- DEL, Data-Entry Language, predecessor of the Lua programming language
- Del (command), a DOS, OS/2, and Microsoft Windows shell command
- <del></del>, HTML tags used to mark text for deletion
- Delete character, also known as rubout
- Delete key, abbreviated Del on computer keyboards

== Acronyms ==
- Defence Electric Light, a defensive spot-light used in Gibraltar in the 20th Century
- Department for Employment and Learning, part of the Northern Ireland government
- Deutsche Eishockey Liga, the premier ice hockey league in Germany
- DNA-encoded chemical library, a technology for the synthesis and screening of collections of chemical compounds

== Codes ==
- DEL, IATA code for Indira Gandhi International Airport, Delhi, India
- del, ISO 639-2 and 639-3 codes for the Delaware languages of Native Americans

== Music ==
- "Del", a song on the album 3rd Eye Vision by Hieroglyphics

== See also ==
- DEL2, the second tier of ice hockey in Germany, below the DEL
- Deel (disambiguation)
- Dell (disambiguation)
- Dele, a mark indicating deletion in copyediting
