= Pipestone Pass (Montana) =

Mountain pass in Montana, United States

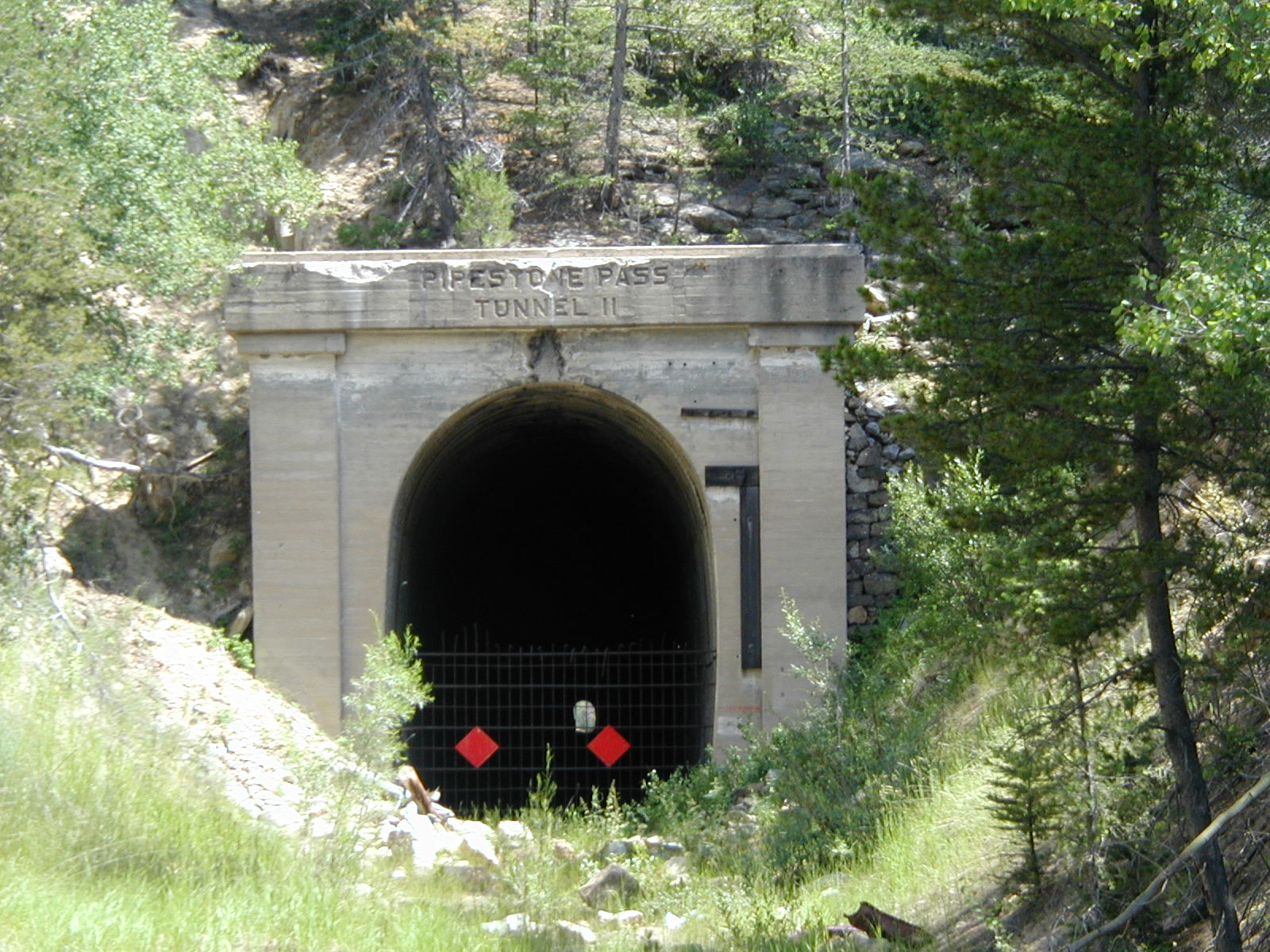
- West portal of the Milwaukee Road's Pipestone Pass Tunnel.
- Interactive map of Pipestone Pass
- Elevation: 1,935 m (6,348 ft)
- Traversed by: Montana State Route 2 and abandoned Milwaukee Road mainline (via Pipestone Tunnel).

Third Approach
- Location: Silver Bow County, Montana, United States
- Range: Rocky Mountains
- Coordinates: 45°51.35′N 112°26.3′W

Pipestone Pass is a mountain pass in the Rocky Mountains of Montana in the United States. It sits on the Continental Divide in Silver Bow County, Montana, 10 miles (16 km) south of Butte, Montana, in Beaverhead-Deerlodge National Forest, at an elevation of 6,453 feet (1,967 m). The pass marks the line between Jefferson and Silver Bow counties.

The name Pipestone refers to a soft, red stone preferred by Native Americans for making pipes.

== History ==
A rough wagon road was initially created in the 1870s to connect Butte and Whitehall.

The Chicago, Milwaukee, St. Paul and Pacific Railroad (commonly known as the Milwaukee Road) used the pass for its crossing of the Continental Divide on its mainline between Chicago, Illinois and the Pacific Northwest. The line was built as part of the Milwaukee Road's Pacific Extension, which was completed in 1909. The railroad line cut under the pass via the 2,290 ft Pipestone Pass Tunnel at an elevation of 6,347 ft (1,935 m). The line was electrified in 1915 and served the Milwaukee Road's premium transcontinental passenger train, the Olympian (later the Olympian Hiawatha). A poor competitive position against the rival Burlington Northern Railroad and substantial losses caused the Milwaukee Road to abandon the line in 1980.

Pipestone Pass was also used (without a tunnel) as the Continental Divide crossing for U.S. Highway 10, dating from 1926. This road is now designated as Montana Highway 2 and known locally as "The Harding Way", the name being coined in honor of President Warren G. Harding on the occasion of his visit to Butte.

A trail running race takes place annually on the Continental Divide Trail between Pipestone Pass and Homestake Pass. Hosted by Butte's Piss and Moan Running Club, the Wulfman CDT 14k is held on the Saturday closest to the Summer solstice.

== See also ==
- Mountain passes in Montana
