= Odell (surname) =

Odell is an English surname originating in Odell, Bedfordshire. In some families the surname is spelled O'Dell, in a mistaken Irish adaptation.

The name derived from Woad Hill.

Notable people with the surname include:

- Benjamin Odell (producer) (born 1969), American film producer
- Benjamin Barker Odell, Jr. (1854–1926), American politician and governor
- Bob Odell (American football) (1922–2012), American football player
- Bob Odell (politician) (born 1943), American politician
- Cary Odell (1910–1988), American art director
- David Odell, American screenwriter and film director
- Deborah Odell (born 1973), Canadian actress
- Dianne Odell (1947–2008), American poliomyelitis patient
- Edward Odell (1947–2013), American mathematician
- Helen Odell (1922–2012), American artist
- Horace Odell (1910–1984), American javelin thrower
- Howard Odell (1910–2000), American football player and coach
- Jack Odell (1920–2007), English toy inventor
- Jenny Odell (born 1986), American artist, writer and educator
- Jonas Odell (born 1962), Swedish director
- Jonathan Odell (1737–1818), American poet
- John Milton Odell (1831–1910), American industrialist
- Mary Jane Odell (1923–2010), American politician
- Mats Odell (born 1947), Swedish politician
- Matthew Odell (born 1979), American pianist
- Maude Odell (1871–1937), American actress
- Moses F. Odell (1818–1866), American politician
- N. Holmes Odell (1828–1904), American politician
- Noel Odell (1890–1987), English geologist and mountaineer
- Robert Odell (1896–1984), American art director
- Tom Odell (born 1990), British singer-songwriter
- Thomas Odell (writer) (1691–1749), English playwright
- Wally Odell (1912–1971), English footballer
- William Odell (cricketer) (1881–1917), English cricketer
- William Hunter Odell (1811–1891), Canadian lawyer, judge, and politician

== See also ==
- Odell (given name)
- O'Dell, surname
