= Mullan Pass =

Mountain pass in Montana, United States

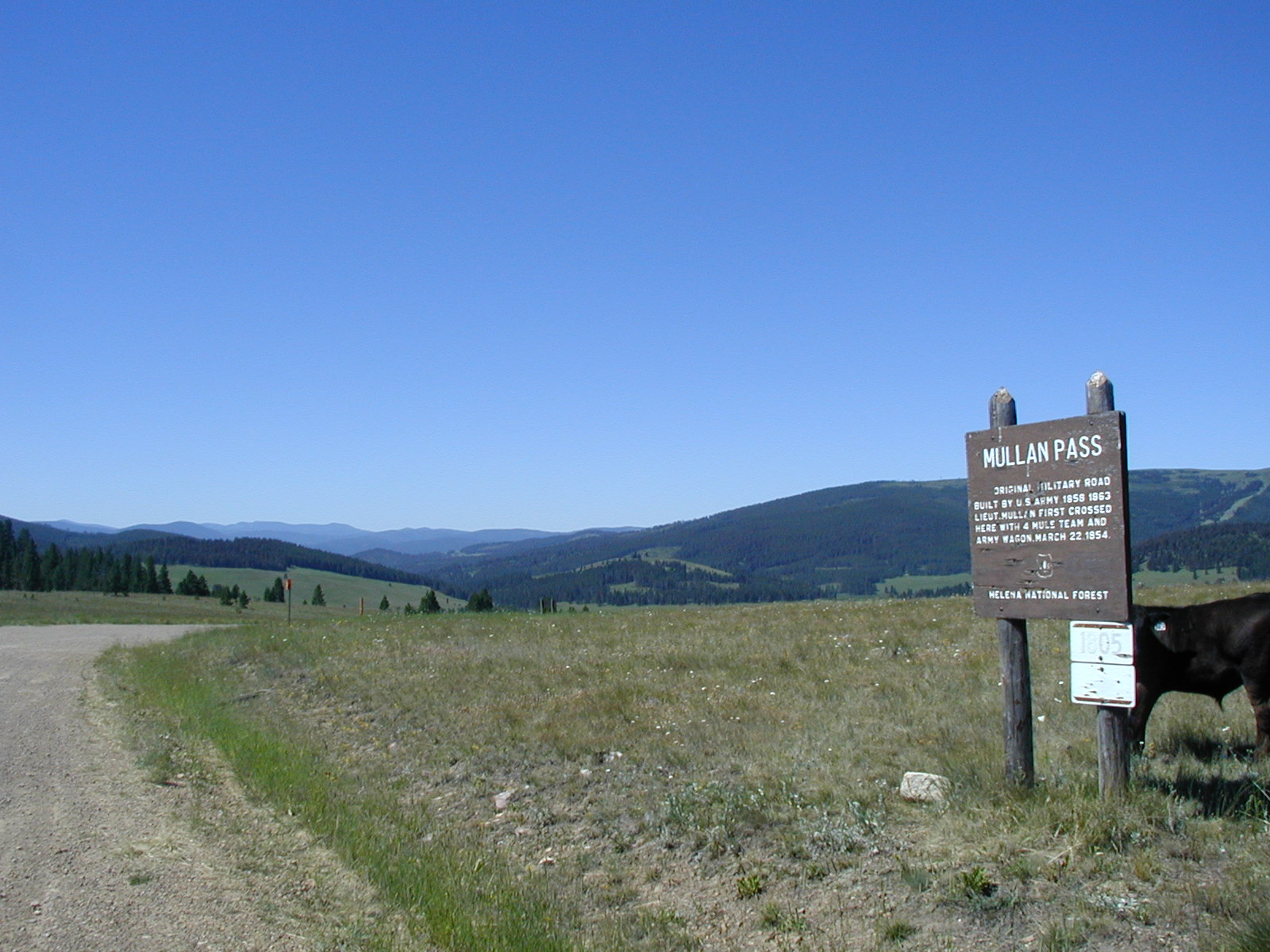
- Historical marker placed at Mullan Pass.

- Location within Montana Location within the United States
- Elevation: 5,902 ft (1,799 m)
- Traversed by: Austin-Mullan Pass Road and BNSF Railway (via Mullan Pass Tunnel).

Third Approach
- Location: Lewis and Clark / Powell counties, Montana, U.S.
- Range: Rocky Mountains
- Coordinates: 46.6434°N 112.3138°W

Mullan Pass is a mountain pass in the western United States, in the Rocky Mountains of Montana. It sits on the Continental Divide on the border between Powell and Lewis and Clark counties at 5,902 feet (1,799 m) above sea level. Located in the Helena National Forest, the pass is thirteen miles (21 km) west of the city of Helena.

The Northern Pacific Railway (NP) used the pass for its line from Logan to Garrison via Helena, built in 1883. This line was the NP's primary freight route and was also used by their secondary passenger train, the Mainstreeter. The NP also built an alternate line over Homestake Pass, which was used by their primary passenger train, the North Coast Limited. The rail line at Mullan Pass is currently operated by BNSF Railway; it crosses under the pass and the continental divide at 5,566 feet (1,697 m) via the 3,426-foot (0.65 mi; 1.04 km) Mullan Tunnel.

The pass was named after Lieutenant John Mullan, the U.S. Army engineer who first crossed the pass on March 22, 1854, and later supervised construction of the Mullan Road, the first road over the pass, in 1860.

== Notable events ==
On September 23, 1862, three Master Masons led by Nathaniel P. Langford convened at Mullan Pass, marking the beginning of Masonry in the region. Today, an annual meeting is held at the outdoor lodge at Mullan Pass to commemorate this event.

On September 30, 1911, Mullan Pass was the site of the first aeronautical crossing of the North American Continental Divide. Aviation pioneer Cromwell Dixon flew from Helena to Blossburg, some 15 miles to the west, over the Mullan Pass then successfully flew back the same day. His achievement earned him $10,000, presented to him by Governor Edwin L. Norris.

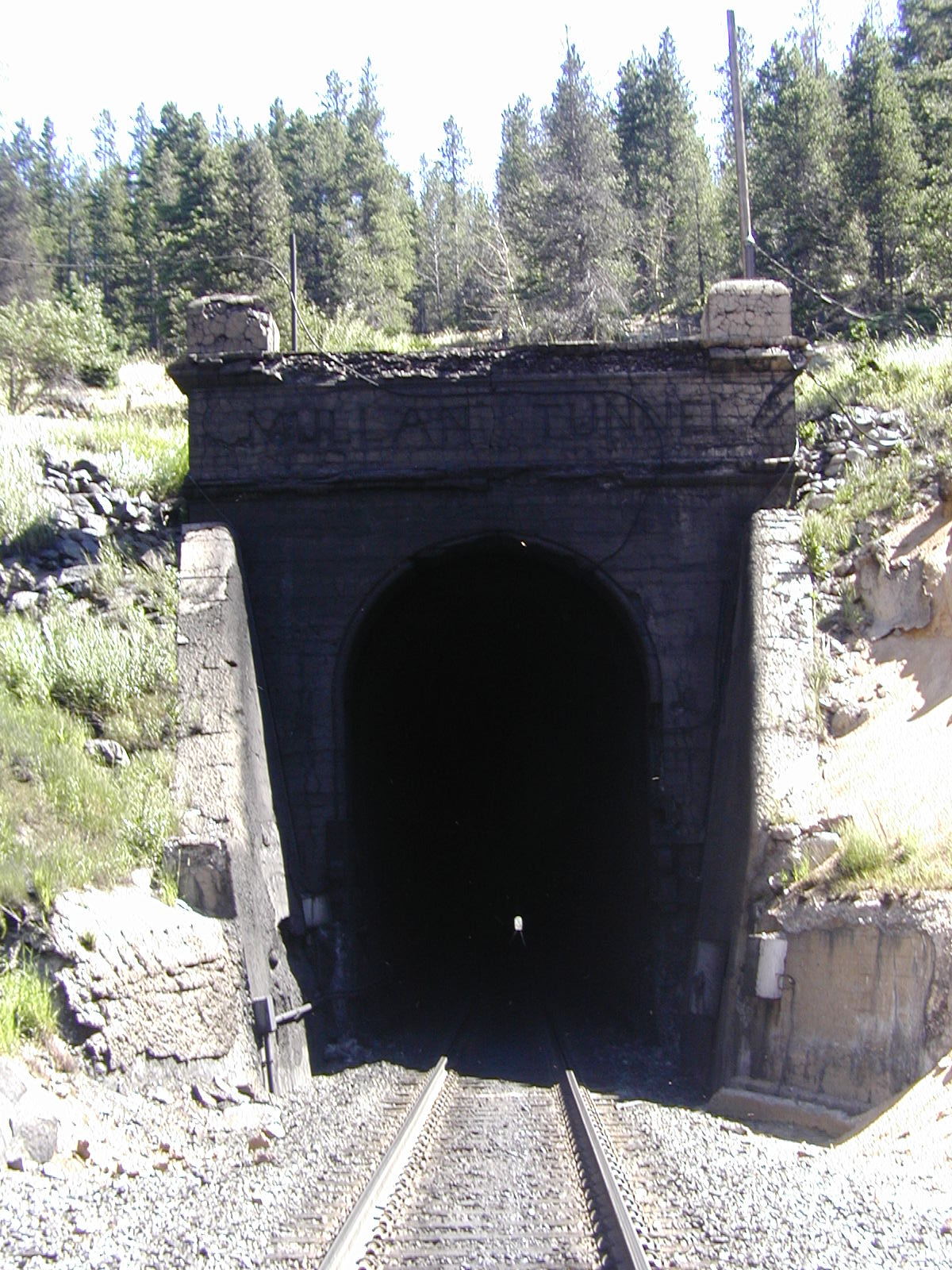
West portal of Mullan Tunnel.

On February 2, 1989, the Helena train wreck occurred when, during a significant cold snap, a train crew uncoupled the locomotives from a 48-car train due to mechanical problems. The air brakes failed on the cars, and the train rolled nine miles back into Helena where, at approximately 5:30 a.m., they collided with a parked work train and caught fire. An explosion later linked to a tank car filled with hydrogen peroxide shook the town, knocked out power, and caused extensive damage in the community, but no deaths.

In mid-July 2009, part of the Mullan Tunnel roof collapsed while it was being enlarged to handle double-stack freight cars. It was reopened to train traffic 28 days later, on August 14, 2009.

== Second Mullan Pass ==
A second Mullan Pass (47.464°N 115.637°W), also on the Mullan Road, is located on the Montana-Idaho border in the Bitterroot Range at 5,168 feet (1,575 m). It is approximately three miles (5 km) east-northeast of Lookout Pass, where Interstate 90 crosses the state line.

== Climate ==
Climate data for Mullan Pass, Idaho, 1991–2020 normals, 1938–2024 extremes: 6,028 ft (1,837 m)
| Month | Jan | Feb | Mar | Apr | May | Jun | Jul | Aug | Sep | Oct | Nov | Dec | Year |
|---|---|---|---|---|---|---|---|---|---|---|---|---|---|
| Record high °F (°C) | 52 (11) | 49 (9) | 61 (16) | 75 (24) | 80 (27) | 90 (32) | 92 (33) | 93 (34) | 85 (29) | 76 (24) | 60 (16) | 46 (8) | 93 (34) |
| Mean maximum °F (°C) | 39.4 (4.1) | 39.8 (4.3) | 47.9 (8.8) | 58.5 (14.7) | 67.9 (19.9) | 76.3 (24.6) | 82.5 (28.1) | 82.6 (28.1) | 75.7 (24.3) | 63.1 (17.3) | 48.0 (8.9) | 39.0 (3.9) | 83.0 (28.3) |
| Mean daily maximum °F (°C) | 27.6 (−2.4) | 28.3 (−2.1) | 34.3 (1.3) | 40.2 (4.6) | 50.3 (10.2) | 58.2 (14.6) | 69.8 (21.0) | 69.4 (20.8) | 59.1 (15.1) | 44.2 (6.8) | 31.9 (−0.1) | 26.7 (−2.9) | 45.0 (7.2) |
| Daily mean °F (°C) | 23.3 (−4.8) | 23.5 (−4.7) | 28.3 (−2.1) | 33.8 (1.0) | 43.0 (6.1) | 50.1 (10.1) | 60.9 (16.1) | 60.4 (15.8) | 51.3 (10.7) | 38.1 (3.4) | 27.7 (−2.4) | 22.4 (−5.3) | 38.6 (3.7) |
| Mean daily minimum °F (°C) | 19.1 (−7.2) | 18.6 (−7.4) | 22.4 (−5.3) | 27.4 (−2.6) | 35.7 (2.1) | 42.1 (5.6) | 52.0 (11.1) | 51.4 (10.8) | 43.5 (6.4) | 31.9 (−0.1) | 23.5 (−4.7) | 18.0 (−7.8) | 32.1 (0.1) |
| Mean minimum °F (°C) | 1.6 (−16.9) | 2.2 (−16.6) | 8.8 (−12.9) | 15.4 (−9.2) | 23.9 (−4.5) | 29.9 (−1.2) | 39.6 (4.2) | 38.7 (3.7) | 29.0 (−1.7) | 17.5 (−8.1) | 10.1 (−12.2) | 1.8 (−16.8) | −7.9 (−22.2) |
| Record low °F (°C) | −25 (−32) | −20 (−29) | −17 (−27) | 2 (−17) | 9 (−13) | 22 (−6) | 28 (−2) | 31 (−1) | 17 (−8) | −3 (−19) | −18 (−28) | −21 (−29) | −25 (−32) |
| Average precipitation inches (mm) | 5.90 (150) | 4.66 (118) | 5.03 (128) | 3.60 (91) | 2.96 (75) | 3.12 (79) | 1.09 (28) | 1.14 (29) | 1.65 (42) | 3.89 (99) | 6.01 (153) | 6.04 (153) | 45.09 (1,145) |
| Average snowfall inches (cm) | 49.2 (125) | 42.8 (109) | 35.0 (89) | 16.6 (42) | 9.7 (25) | 2.8 (7.1) | 0.1 (0.25) | trace | 2.5 (6.4) | 16.5 (42) | 43.2 (110) | 52.7 (134) | 271.1 (689.75) |
| Average precipitation days (≥ 0.01 in) | 19.3 | 17.5 | 19.6 | 16.9 | 14.9 | 13.1 | 5.7 | 6.1 | 8.0 | 13.3 | 18.3 | 17.5 | 170.2 |
| Average snowy days (≥ 0.1 in) | 19 | 18 | 18 | 12 | 5 | 2 | 0 | 0 | 2 | 8 | 16 | 21 | 121 |
Source 1: NOAA
Source 2: XMACIS2 (records, monthly max/mins & 1942-1957 snow)

== See also ==
- List of railroad crossings of the North American continental divide
- Lookout Pass
- Lookout Pass Ski and Recreation Area
- Mountain passes in Montana
