= List of mountain passes in Switzerland =

This is a list of mountain passes in Switzerland. They are generally situated in the Jura Mountains or in the Swiss Alps.

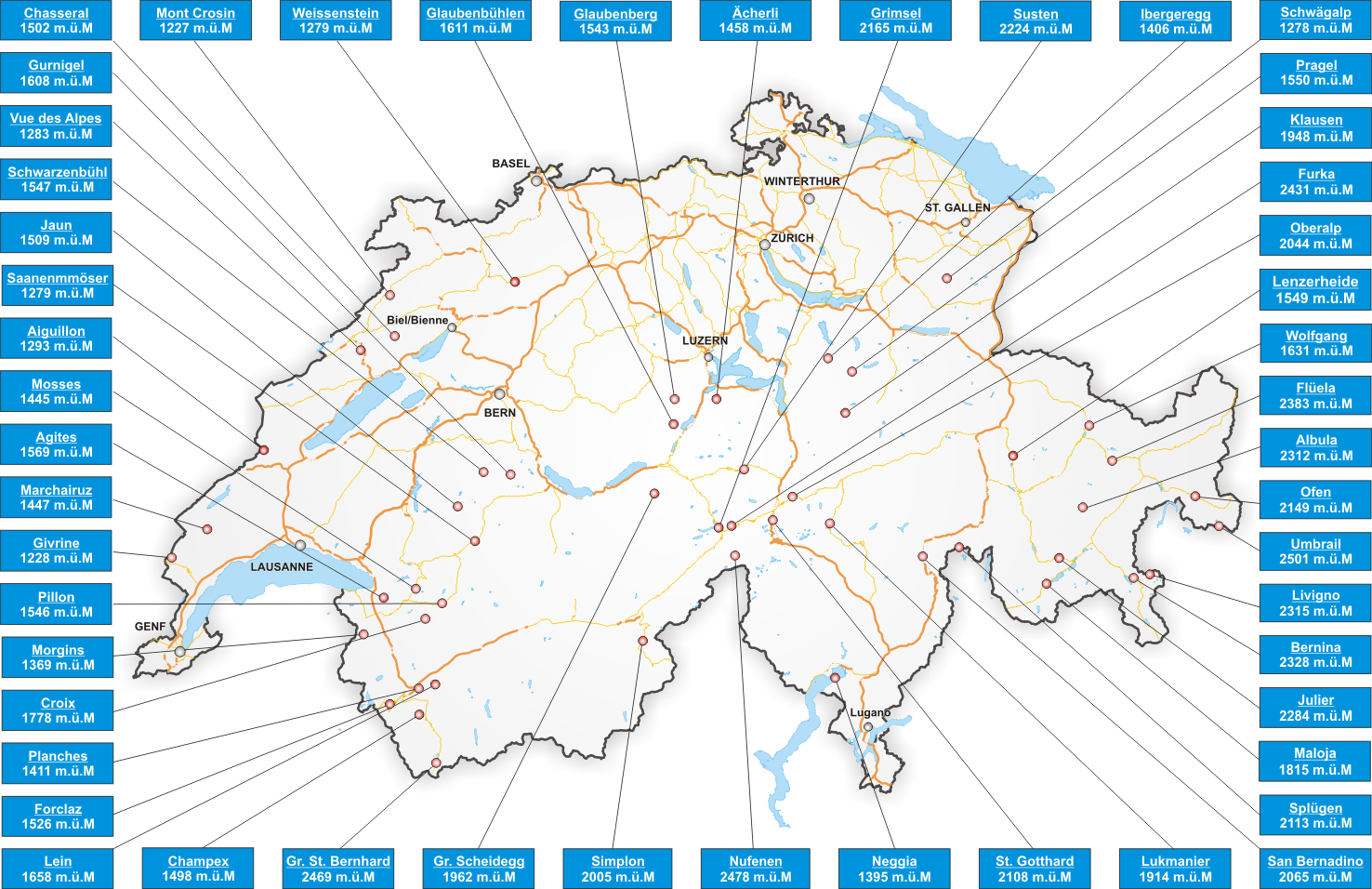
Passes above 1200 m

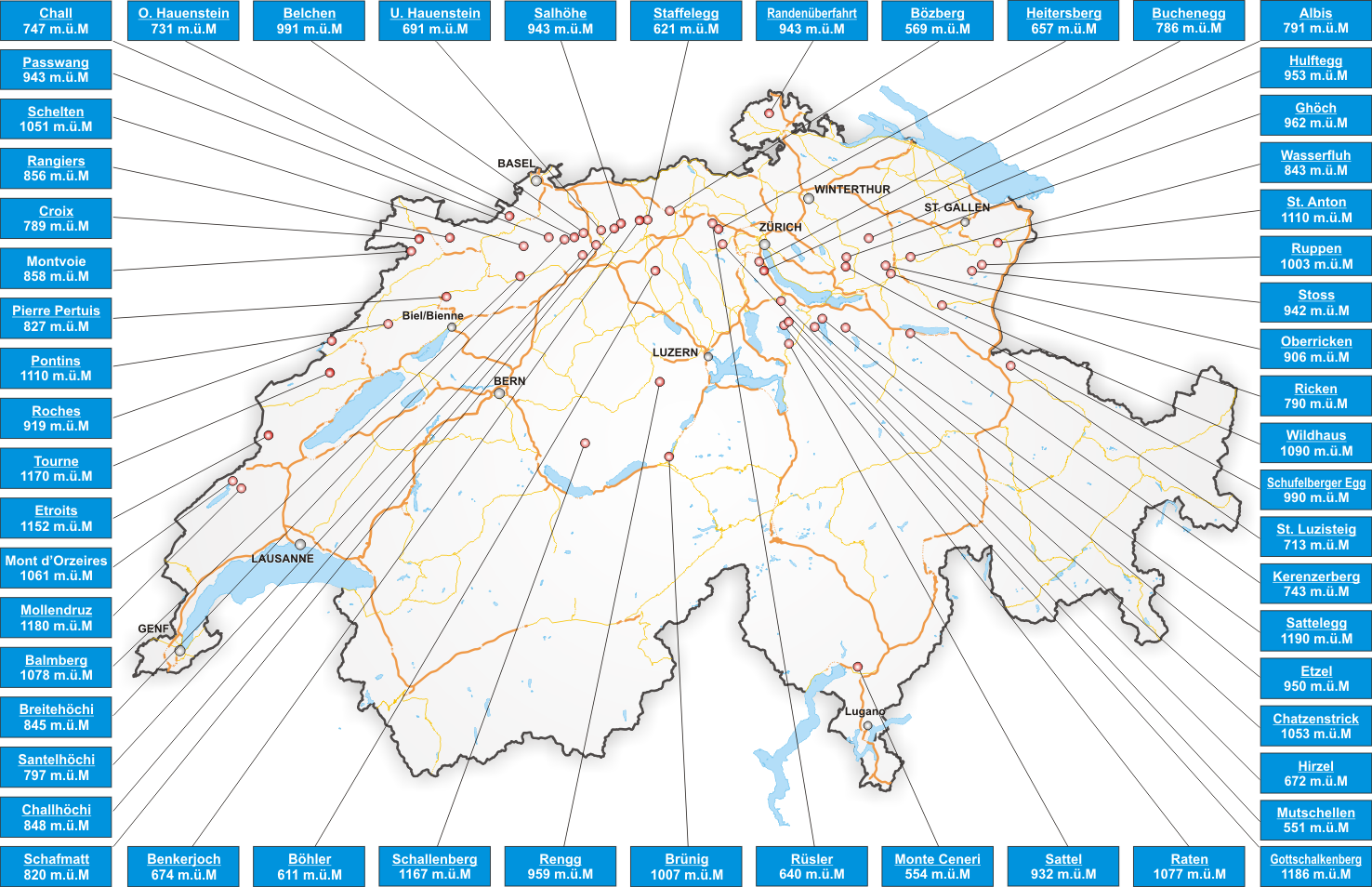
Passes below 1200 m

== Pass roads ==
Pass Roads
Name	Region	From – To	Elevation (m)	Max. gradient	Type	Source
Ächerli	OW/NW	Kerns OW – Dallenwil NW	1458	16%	road	
Agites	VD	Yvorne – La Lécherette	1569		road	
Aiguillon	VD	Baulmes – L'Auberson	1293	18%	road	
Albis	ZH	Langnau am Albis – Türlen	791	8%	road	
Albula	GR	Filisur – La Punt	2312	12%	road	
Alpe di Neggia	TI	Vira – Indemini	1395	12%	road	
Balmberg	SO	Welschenrohr – Günsberg	1078		road	
Belchenflue	BL/SO		1099		road	
Benkerjoch	AG	Küttigen – Oberhof	674		road	
Bernina	GR	Samedan – Poschiavo	2328	10%	road	
Bööler	AG	Unterkulm – Schöftland	611		road	
Bözberg	AG	Brugg – Frick	569	8%	road	
Brünig	BE/OW	Meiringen BE – Lungern OW	1008		road	
Buchenegg	ZH	Langnau am Albis – Tägerst	786		road	
Chalet-à-Gobet	VD	Lausanne-Moudon	873		road	
Challhöchi	BL		848		road	
Champex	VS		1470		road	
Chasseral	BE	Nods BE – Saint-Imier	1502	11%	road	
Chatzenstrick	SZ	Einsiedeln – Altmatt	1053		road	
Chilchzimmersattel	BL	Eptingen – Langenbruck	991		road	
Croix	VD	Bex – Les Diablerets	1778	12%	road	
Croix	JU	Saint-Ursanne – Courgenay	789	9%	road	
Etroits	VD	Yverdon – Fleurier	1152	8%	road	
Etzel	SZ	Pfäffikon – Einsiedeln	950	10%	road	
Flüela	GR	Davos – Susch	2383	10%	road	
Forch	ZH	Maur ZH – Küsnacht ZH	682		road	
Forclaz	VS	Martigny – Le Châtelard	1526	8%	road	
Furka	UR/VS	Realp UR – Oberwald VS	2431	11%	road	
Ghöch	ZH		962		road	
Givrine	VD/France	Nyon VD – Morez FR	1228	8%	road	
Glaubenberg	LU/OW	Entlebuch LU – Sarnen OW	1543	18%	road	
Glaubenbühl	LU/OW	Schüpfheim LU – Giswil OW	1611	12%	road	
Gottschalkenberg	ZG		1164		road	
Grand St. Bernard	VS	Martigny VS – Aosta IT	2469	11%	road/tunnel	
Grimsel	BE/VS	Innertkirchen BE – Gletsch VS	2165	10%	road	
Grosse Scheidegg	BE	Grindelwald – Meiringen	1962	14%	road (closed for cars)	
Gurnigel	BE	Riggisberg – Zollhaus	1608		road	
Heitersberg	AG	Mellingen – Killwangen	657		road	
Hirzel	ZH	Wädenswil – Sihlbrugg	672		road	
Hulftegg	ZH/SG	Fischenthal ZU – Mosnang SG	953	10%	road	
Ibergeregg	SZ	Schwyz – Unteriberg	1406	14%	road	
Jaun	FR/BE	Charmey FR – Reidenbach BE	1509	14%	road	
Julier	GR	Tiefencastel – Silvaplana	2284	10%	road	
Kerenzerberg	GL	Mollis – Mühlehorn	743	9%	road/motorway tunnel	
Klausen	UR/GL	Altdorf UR – Linthal GL	1948	9%	road	
Lenzerheide	GR	Chur – Tiefencastel	1549	11%	road	
Livigno	GR/Italy	La Motta GR – Livigno IT	2315	12%	road	
Lukmanier	GR/TI	Disentis GR – Biasca TI	1914	9%	road	
Maloja	GR/Italy	Silvaplana GR – Chiavenna IT	1815	9%	road	
Marchairuz	VD	Bière – Le Brassus	1447	14%	road	
Mollendruz	VD	Cossonay – Le Pont	1180	14%	road	
Mont Crosin	BE	Saint-Imier – Tramelan	1227	12%	road	
Mont d'Orzeires	VD	Vallorbe – L'Abbaye	1060	10.4%	road	
Monte Ceneri	TI	Magadinoebene – Vedeggio valley	554		road	
Moosalp	VS	Bürchen – Stalden	2048		road	
Morgins	VS/France	Monthey VS – Abondance FR	1369	14%	road	
Mosses	VD/BE	Aigle VD – Saanen BE	1445	10%	road	
Mutschellen	AG	Dietikon – Bremgarten	551		road	
Nufenen	VS/TI	Ulrichen VS – Airolo TI	2478	13%	road	
Oberalp	GR/UR	Disentis GR – Andermatt UR	2044	10%	road	
Oberer Hauenstein	SO/BL	Balsthal SO – Waldenburg BL	731	6%	road	
Oberricken	SG		906		road	
Ofen (Fuorn Pass)	GR	Zernez – Sta. Maria	2149	10%	road	
Passwang	SO	Erschwil – Mümliswil	943	11%	road	
Pierre du Moëllé	VD	Le Sépey – Lac de l'Hongrin	1661	16.5%	road	
Pierre Pertuis	BE	Sonceboz – Tavannes	827	9%	road	
Pillon	VD/BE	Le Sépey VD – Gstaad BE	1546	11%	road	
Pontins	NE/BE	Neuchâtel – St. Imier BE	1110	9%	road	
Pragel	SZ/GL	Hinterthal SZ – Netstal GL	1550	18%	road	
Rangiers	JU	Courgenay – Develier	856	12%	road	
Raten	ZG/SZ	Oberägeri ZG – Biberbrugg SZ	1077	15%	road	
Rengg	LU	Entlebuch – Schachen	959		road	
Ricken	SG	Eschenbach – Wattwil	790	9%	road	
Roches	NE/France	Le Locle NE – Morteau FR	919	7%	road	
Ruppen	AR/SG	Trogen AR – Altstätten	1003	9%	road	
Rüsler	AG	Oberrohrdorf – Neuenhof	649		road	
Saanenmöser	BE	Zweisimmen – Saanen	1279		road	
Salhöhe	SO/AG	Kienberg SO – Erlinsbach AG	779	9%	road	
San Bernardino	GR/TI	Thusis GR – Bellinzona TI	2065	10%	road/motorway tunnel	
Santelhöchi	SO	Egerkingen – Bärenwil	797		road	
Sattel	SZ	Pfäffikon – Seewen	932	7%	road	
Sattelegg	SZ	Willerzell – Siebnen	1190	14%	road	
Schallenberg	BE	Oberei – Schangnau	1167	10%	road	
Schelten	JU/SO	Delémont JU – Balsthal SO	1051	12%	road	
Schufelberger Egg	ZH	Hinwil – Fischenthal	990		road	
Schwägalp	SG/AR	Neu St. Johann SG – Urnäsch AR	1278	12%	road	
Schwarzenbühl	BE	Guggisberg – Gurnigel Pass	1547		road	
Simplon	VS/Italy	Brig VS – Domodossola IT	2005	9%	road	
Splügen	GR/Italy	Splügen GR – Chiavenna IT	2113	10%	road	
St. Anton	AI/SG	Oberegg AI – Ruppen Pass SG	1105	9	road	
St. Gotthard	UR/TI	Göschenen UR – Airolo TI	2108	8%	road/motorway tunnel	
St. Luzisteig	GR/Liechtenstein	Maienfeld GR – Vaduz LS	713	11%	road	
Staffelegg	AG	Frick – Aarau	621	10%	road	
Stoss	AI		942		road	
Susten	BE/UR	Innertkirchen BE – Wassen UR	2224	9%	road	
Tourne	NE	Peseux – Le Locle	1170	10%	road	
Umbrail	GR/Italy	Santa Maria Val Müstair GR – Stelvio Pass IT	2501	12%	road	
Unterer Hauenstein	SO/BL	Olten SO – Sissach BL	691	6%	road	
Vue des Alpes	NE	Neuchâtel – La Chaux-de-Fonds	1283	10%	road/motorway tunnel	
Wasserfluh	SG	Lichtensteig – St. Peterzell	843	10%	road	
Weissenstein	SO	Oberdorf – Gänsbrunnen	1284	20%	road	
Wildhaus	SG	Wattwil – Buchs	1090	10%	road	
Wolfgang	GR	Klosters – Davos	1631	10%	road	
Zugerberg	ZG		1039		road	

== Trails ==
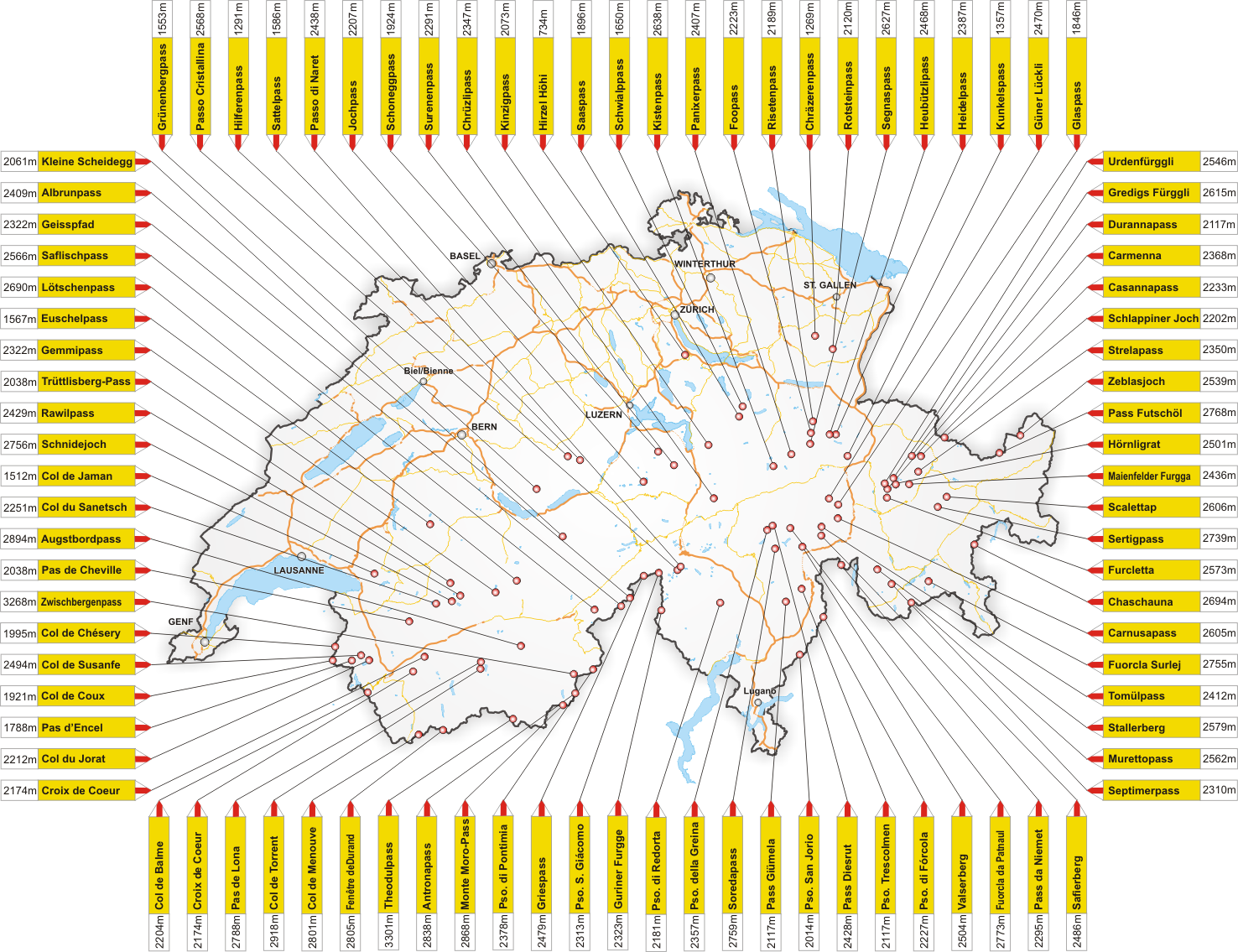
Bridle paths in Switzerland

All trails listed are bridle paths.

Trails
Name	Region	From – To	Elevation (m)
Albrun	VS/Italy	Binn – A. Dévero	2409
Col de l'âne	VS	Bourg St-Pierre – Fionnay	3033
Col des Arpettes	VS	Ayer – Gruben	3008
Antron	VS/Italy	Saas Almagell – Antronapiana	2838
Augstbord	VS	Gruben – St. Niklaus	2894
Balme	VS/France	Trient – Le Tour	2204
Barna	GR/Italy	Cebia – Campodolcino	2548
Bunderchrinde	BE	Kandersteg – Adelboden	2385
Chaschauna	GR/Italy	S-chanf – Livigno	2694
Col de Chésery	VS/France	Champoussin – Avoriaz	1995
Cheville	VD/VS	Anzeindaz – Derborance	2038
Chräzeren	SG	Schiltmoos – Horn	1269
Chrüzli	UR/GR	Amsteg – Seprun	2347
Col Collon	VS/Italy	Arolla – Bionaz	3074
Cristallina	TI	San Carlo – Ossasco	2568
Croix de Coeur	VS	Mayens de Riddes – Verbier	2174
Coux	VS/France	Champéry – Le Charny	1921
Diesrut	GR	Trun – Puzatsch	2428
Durand	VS/Italy	Fionnay – Vaud	2805
Encel	VS	Champéry – Cab. de Susanfe	1788
Euschel	FR	Schwarzsee – Jaun	1567
Foo	SG/GL	Weisstannen – Elm	2223
Fórcola	GR/Italy	Soazza – Menarola	2227
Fuorcla Surley	GR	Pontresina – Sils Maria	2755
Guriner Furgge	TI/Italy	Bosco/Gurin – Rivasco	2323
Futschöl	GR/Austria	Ardez – Galtür	2768
Gemmi	VS/BE	Leukerbad – Kandersteg	2322
Giumella	GR/TI	Rossa GR – Fontana (Biasca)	2117
Glas	GR	Safien – Tschappina	1846
Greina	TI/GR	Daigra – Trun	2357
Gries	VS/Italy	Nufenenpass – Riale	2479
Grünenberg	BE	Habkern – Schangnau	1553
Hahnenmoos	BE	Adelboden – Lenk	1950
Hilferen	LU	Wiggen – Flühli	1291
Hohtürli	BE	Griesalp – Kandersteg	2778
Haggenegg	SZ	Alpthal – Schwyz	1414
Holzegg	SZ	Alpthal – Schwyz	1405
Jaman	VD/FR	Les Avants – Montbovon	1512
Joch	NW/BE	Trüebsee – Engstlenalp	2207
Kinzig	UR/SZ	Bürglen – Muotathal	2073
Kisten	GL/GR	Linthal – Breil/Brigels	2638
Kleine Scheidegg	BE	Grindelwald – Lauterbrunnen	2061
Kunkels	GR/SG	Tamins – Vättis	1357
Lein	VS	Levron – Luy	1656
Lona	VS	Eison – Grimentz	2788
Lötschen	VS/BE	Goppenstein – Kandersteg	2690
Menouve	VS/France	Bourg St. Bernhard – Prailles	2801
Monte Moro	VS/Italy	Saas Almagell – Macugnaga	2868
Naret	TI	Ossasco – Fusio	2438
Niemet	GR/Italy	Innerferrera – Pianazzo	2295
Panix	GL/GR	Elm – Pigniu	2407
Planches	VS	Chemin – Vens	1411
Pontimia	VS/Italy	Zwischbergen – Bognanco	2378
Rawil	VS/BE	Praz Combeira – Lenk	2429
Redorta	TI	Monti di S. Carlo – Sonogno	2181
Richetli	GL	Elm – Linthal	2261
Riseten	SG, GL	Weisstannen – Matt	2189
San Giacomo	TI/Italy	Ronco – Riale	2313
San Lucio	TI/Italy	Bogno – Cavargna	1541
San Jorio	TI/Italy	Carena – Garzeno	2014
Safierberg	GR	Splügen – Thalkirch	2486
Saflisch	VS	Rosswald – Binn	2566
Sanetsch	VS/BE	Sion – Gsteig	2251
Sattel	LU/OW	Flühli – Grossteil	1586
Scaletta Pass	GR	Davos – Cinuos-chel	2606
Schlappiner Joch	GR/Austria	Klosters – St. Gallenkirch	2202
Schöllijoch	VS	Gruben – Randa	3343
Schonegg	NW/UR	Oberrickenbach – St. Jakob	1924
Sefinenfurgge	BE	Lauterbrunnen – Griesalp	2612
Segnas	GL/GR	Elm – Flims	2627
Septimer	GR	Casáccia – Bivio	2310
Sertig	GR	Sertig – Susauna	2739
Stallerberg	GR	Juf – Bivio	2579
Strela	GR	Langwies – Davos	2350
Surenen	OW/UR	Engelberg – Attinghausen	2291
Susanfe	VS	Salvan – Cab. de Susanfe	2494
Theodul	VS/Italy	Zermatt – Cervina	3301
Tomül	GR	Platz – Thalkirch	2412
Torrent	VS	Villa – Grimentz	2918
Trescolmen	GR	Valbella – Mesocco	2161
Trüttlisberg	BE	Lauenen – Lenk	2038
Zeblasjoch	GR/Austria	Samnaun GR – Ischgl ÖS	2539
Zwischbergen	VS	Saas Grund – Gondo	3268

== Railway ==
Railway
Name	Region	From – To	Built/Opened	Elevation (m)	Type
Albula Railway	GR	Filisur – La Punt	1903	1823	railway tunnel
Bernina Railway	GR	Samedan – Poschiavo	1906–1910	2253	railway
Bözberg	AG	Brugg – Frick	1874	461	railway tunnel
Brünig	BE/NW	Meiringen BE – Giswil NW	1888	1007	railway
Furka Heritage Railway	UR/VS	Realp UR – Gletsch	1914	2160	railway tunnel
Furka	UR/VS	Realp UR – Oberwald VS	1998	1550	railway tunnel
Col de la Givrine	VD	Nyon – La Cure		1228	railway
Kerenzerberg	GL	Mollis – Mühlehorn	1960	426	railway tunnel
Kleine Scheidegg	BE	Lauterbrunnen – Grindelwald	1892	2061	railway
Lötschberg Tunnel	BE/VS	Kandersteg BE – Goppenstein VS	1913	1216	railway tunnel with car transport
Oberalp	GR/UR	Disentis GR – Andermatt UR	1926	2044	railway
Saanenmöser	VD/BE	Montreux VD – Zweisimmen BE	1901–1912	1279	railway
Simplon	VS/Italy	Brig VS – Domodossola IT	1892–1906	690	railway tunnel
St. Gotthard	UR/TI	Göschenen UR – Airolo TI	1882	1141	railway tunnel
Vereina Tunnel	GR	Klosters – Susch	1999	1430	railway tunnel with car transport
Vue des Alpes	NE	Neuchâtel – La Chaux-de-Fonds		1040	railway tunnel
Weissenstein	SO	Oberdorf – Gänsbrunnen	1908	732	railway tunnel
Wolfgang	GR	Klosters – Davos		1631	railway

== See also ==
- List of highest road passes in Switzerland
- List of highest paved roads in Switzerland
- List of mountains of Switzerland
