= List of highest road passes in Switzerland =

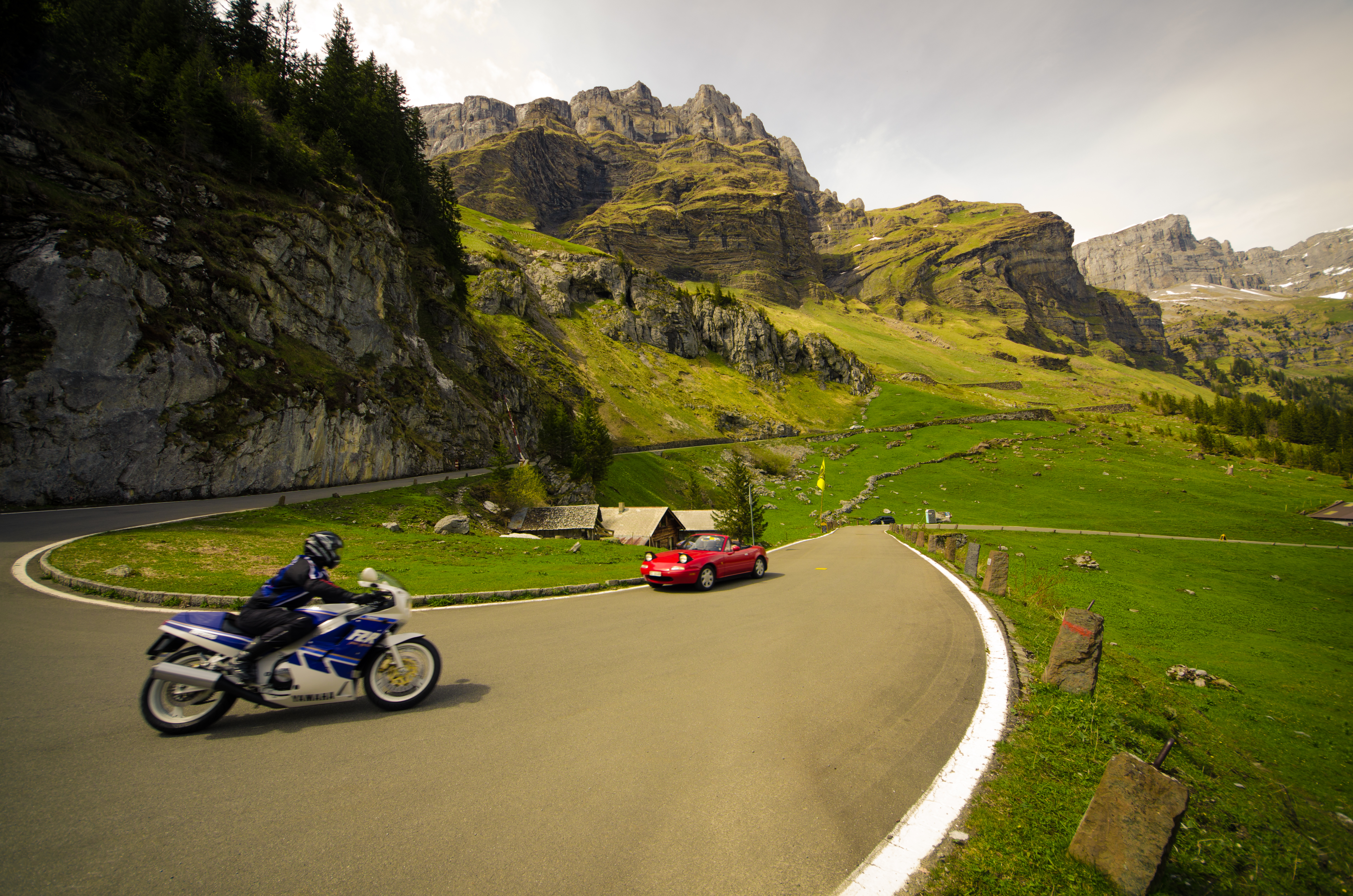
The Klausen Pass road

This is a list of the highest road passes in Switzerland. It includes passes in the Alps and the Jura Mountains that are over 1,000 metres (3,281 feet) above sea level. All the listed passes are crossed by paved roads. These are popular with drivers, bikers and cyclists for their spectacular scenery and are often the highlights of bicycle races such as Tour de Suisse and Tour de Romandie. Many of them are also served by public transport, the main transport company being PostBus Switzerland.

Only fully paved roads of which both ends are connected to the main Swiss or European road network are included. Dead-end roads such as the Sanetsch and Glas Pass are not listed. For a list including dead-end roads as well, see list of highest paved roads in Switzerland. For a list of all passes, whether crossed by a paved road or not, see List of mountain passes in Switzerland.

== List ==
Pass	Elevation	Location
Umbrail	2,501 metres (8,205 ft)	Swiss-Italian border in the Alps between Santa Maria Val Müstair, Switzerland and Bormio, Italy
Nufenen	2,478 metres (8,130 ft)	In the Alps between Ulrichen, Valais and Airolo, Ticino
Grand Saint Bernard	2,469 metres (8,100 ft)	Swiss-Italian border in the Valais (Pennine) Alps between Martigny, Switzerland and Aosta, Italy
Furka	2,427 metres (7,963 ft)	In the Valais (Pennine) Alps between Gletsch, Valais and Realp, Uri
Flüela	2,383 metres (7,818 ft)	In the canton of Graubünden between Davos and Susch in the lower Inn Valley (Engadin)
Bernina	2,328 metres (7,638 ft)	In the canton of Graubünden between St. Moritz and Val Poschiavo
Livigno	2,315 metres (7,595 ft)	In the Alps on the Swiss-Italian border between Motta, Graubünden and Livigno, Italy
Albula	2,312 metres (7,585 ft)	In the canton of Graubünden between Thusis and La Punt in the Inn Valley (Engadin)
Julier	2,284 metres (7,493 ft)	In the canton of Graubünden between Tiefencastel in the Rhine Valley and Silvaplana in the Inn Valley (Engadin)
Susten	2,224 metres (7,297 ft)	In the Alps between Innertkirchen, Bern and Wassen, Uri
Croix du Cœur	2,174 metres (7,133 ft)	In Valais between Verbier and Riddes
Grimsel	2,165 metres (7,103 ft)	In the Alps between Innertkirchen, Bern and Gletsch, Valais
Fuorn	2,149 metres (7,051 ft)	In the Alps in the canton of Graubünden between Zernez in the Inn Valley (Engadin) and Val Müstair
Splügen	2,117 metres (6,946 ft)	In the Alps on the Swiss-Italian border between Splugen, Graubünden and Chiavenna, Italy
Saint Gotthard	2,106 metres (6,909 ft)	In the Alps between Göschenen, Uri and Airolo, Ticino
San Bernardino	2,065 metres (6,775 ft)	In the Alps between Thusis, Graubünden and Bellinzona, Ticino
Moosalp	2,048 metres (6,719 ft)	In the Alps in the canton of Valais between Bürchen and Törbel
Oberalp	2,044 metres (6,706 ft)	In the Alps between Andermatt, Uri and Disentis, Graubünden
Simplon	2,008 metres (6,588 ft)	Just north (in Switzerland) of the Swiss-Italian border in the Valais (Pennine) Alps between Brig, Switzerland and Villadossola, Italy
Grosse Scheidegg	1,961 metres (6,434 ft)	In the Alps in the canton of Bern between Grindelwald and Meiringen. Open to bus traffic only.
Klausen	1,948 metres (6,391 ft)	In the Alps between Altdorf, Uri and Linthal, Glarus
Lukmanier	1,914 metres (6,280 ft)	In the Alps between Disentis, Graubünden and Biasca, Ticino
Maloja	1,815 metres (5,955 ft)	In the canton of Graubünden between the Inn Valley (Engadin) and the Val Bregaglia and Chiavenna in Italy
Croix	1,778 metres (5,833 ft)	In the Alps in the canton of Vaud between Bex and Les Diablerets
Pierre du Moëllé	1,661 metres (5,449 ft)	In the Alps in the canton of Vaud between Le Sépey and Lac de l'Hongrin
Mittelberg	1,633 metres (5,358 ft)	In the Alps between Rougemont, Vaud and Abländschen, Bern
Wolfgang	1,631 metres (5,351 ft)	In the Alps in the canton of Graubünden between Klosters and Davos
Glaubenbühl	1,611 metres (5,285 ft)	In the Alps between Flühli, Lucerne and Giswil, Obwalden
Gurnigel	1,608 metres (5,276 ft)	In the canton of Bern between Riggisberg and Zollhaus
Les Agites	1,569 metres (5,148 ft)	In the Alps in the canton of Vaud between Yvorne and La Lécherette
Pragel	1,550 metres (5,090 ft)	In the Alps between Muotathal, Schwyz and Netstal, Glarus
Lenzerheide	1,549 metres (5,082 ft)	In the Alps in the canton of Graubünden between Chur and Tiefencastel
Schwarzenbühl	1,547 metres (5,075 ft)	In the Alps in the canton of Bern between Guggisberg and Gurnigel Pass
Pillon	1,546 metres (5,072 ft)	In the Alps in the canton of Vaud between Aigle and Les Diablerets
Glaubenberg	1,543 metres (5,062 ft)	In the Alps between Entlebuch, Lucerne and Sarnen, Obwalden
Forclaz	1,527 metres (5,010 ft)	In the Alps in the canton of Valais between Martigny and Chamonix, France
Jaun	1,509 metres (4,951 ft)	In the Alps between Charmey, Fribourg and Boltigen, Bern
Chasseral	1,502 metres (4,928 ft)	In the Jura in the canton of Bern
Champex	1,490 metres (4,890 ft)	In the Alps in the canton of Valais between Martigny and Orsières
Marchairuz	1,447 metres (4,747 ft)	In the Jura in the canton of Vaud between Le Brassus and Bière
Mosses	1,445 metres (4,741 ft)	In the Alps in the canton of Vaud between Aigle and Château d'Oex
Planches	1,411 metres (4,629 ft)	In the Alps in the canton of Valais between Martigny and Sembrancher
Ibergeregg	1,406 metres (4,613 ft)	In the Alps in the canton of Schwyz between the town of Schwyz and Oberiberg
Ächerli	1,398 metres (4,587 ft)	In the Alps between Kerns, Obwalden and Dallenwil, Nidwalden
Alpe di Neggia	1,395 metres (4,577 ft)	In the Alps in the canton of Ticino between Gambarogno and Indemini
Pas de Morgins	1,369 metres (4,491 ft)	In the Alps on the Swiss-French border between Monthey, Valais and Abondance, France
Kunkels	1,357 metres (4,452 ft)	In the Alps in the canton of Graubünden between Bad Ragaz and Tamins
Aiguillon	1,293 metres (4,242 ft)	In the Jura in the canton of Vaud between L'Auberson and Baulmes
Weissenstein	1,284 metres (4,213 ft)	In the Jura in the canton of Solothurn between Oberdorf and Gänsbrunnen
Vue des Alpes	1,282 metres (4,206 ft)	In the Jura in the canton of Neuchâtel between La Chaux-de-Fonds and Neuchâtel
Saanenmöser	1,279 metres (4,196 ft)	In the Bernese Oberland between Zweisimmen and Saanen
Schwägalp	1,278 metres (4,193 ft)	In the Alps between Toggenburg, St. Gallen and Urnäsch, Appenzell Ausserrhoden
Givrine	1,228 metres (4,029 ft)	On the Swiss-French border in the Jura between Nyon, Vaud and Morez, France
Mont Crosin	1,227 metres (4,026 ft)	In the Jura in the canton of Bern
Sattelegg	1,190 metres (3,900 ft)	In the Alps in the canton of Schwyz between Siebnen and Willerzell
Wildhaus	1,090 metres (3,580 ft)	In the Alps in the canton of St. Gallen between Gams and Unterwasser
Mollendruz	1,180 metres (3,870 ft)	In the Jura in the canton of Vaud between L'Isle and Le Pont
La Tourne	1,170 metres (3,840 ft)	In the Jura in the canton of Neuchâtel between Les Petits-Ponts and Montmollin
Schallenberg	1,167 metres (3,829 ft)	In the canton of Bern between Steffisburg and Wiggen
Gottschalkenberg	1,164 metres (3,819 ft)	In the Alps in the canton of Zug
Etroits	1,152 metres (3,780 ft)	In the Jura in the canton of Vaud between Yverdon and Fleurier
Schelten	1,151 metres (3,776 ft)	In the Jura between Mervelier, Jura and Ramiswil, Solothurn
Les Pontins	1,110 metres (3,640 ft)	In the Jura in the canton of Bern
St. Anton	1,105 metres (3,625 ft)	In the Alps between Muolen, St. Gallen and Ruppen Pass
Belchenflue	1,099 metres (3,606 ft)	In the Jura between the cantons of Basel-Land and Solothurn
Balmberg	1,078 metres (3,537 ft)	In the Jura in the canton of Solothurn between Welschenrohr and Günsberg
Raten	1,077 metres (3,533 ft)	In the Alps in the canton of Zug between Oberägeri and Biberbrugg
Mont d'Orzeires	1,060 metres (3,480 ft)	In the Jura in the canton of Vaud
Chatzenstrick	1,053 metres (3,455 ft)	In the canton of Schwyz between Einsiedeln and Altmatt
Brünig	1,008 metres (3,307 ft)	In the Bernese Oberland between Meiringen, Bern and Lungern, Obwalden
Ruppen	1,003 metres (3,291 ft)	In the Alps between Altstätten, St. Gallen and Trogen, Appenzell Ausserrhoden
