= Weissenstein =

Mountain in Switzerland

- Röti
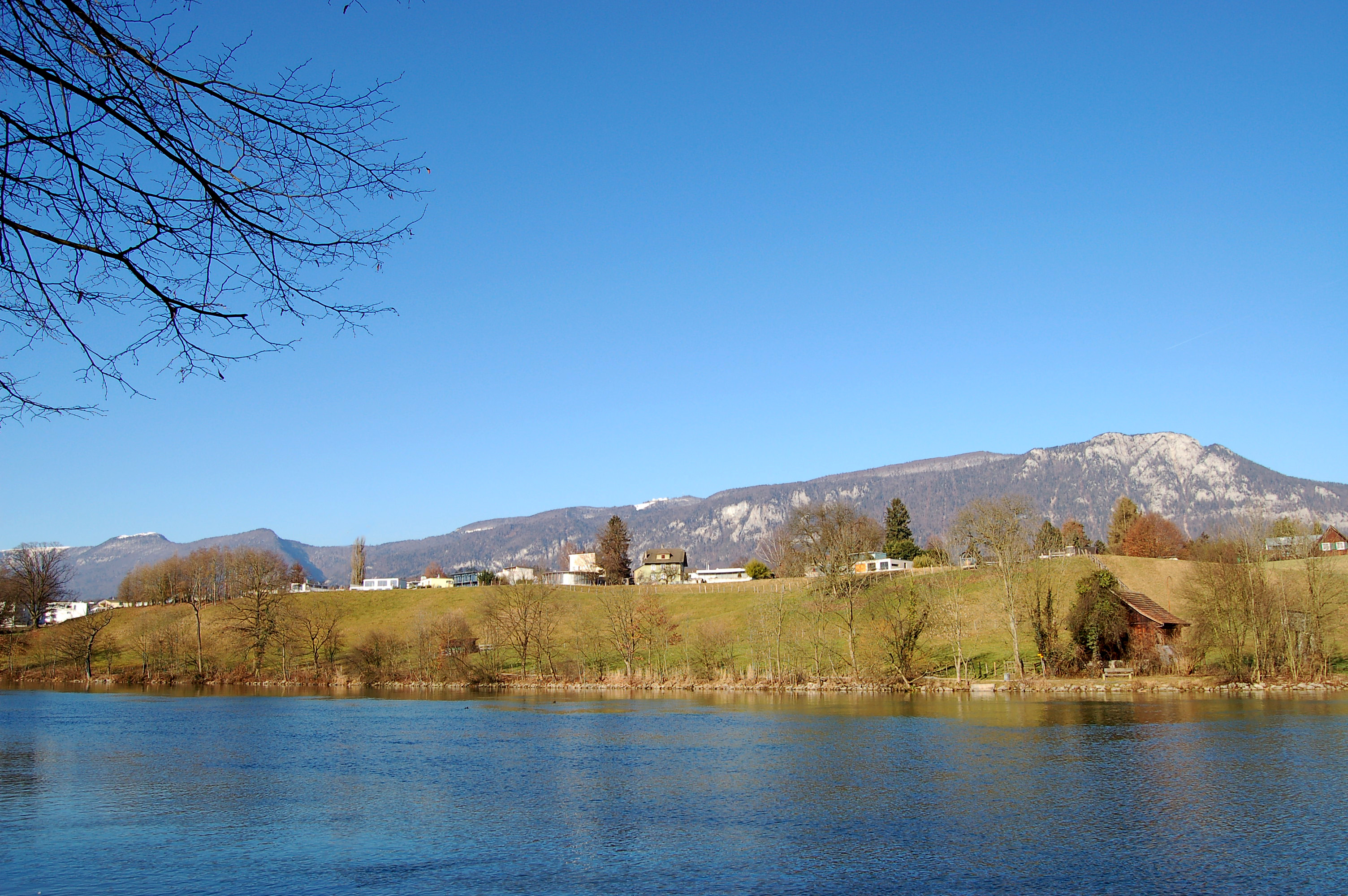
- View from Feldbrunnen (south side)

Highest point
- Elevation: 1,395 m (4,577 ft)
- Prominence: 213 m (699 ft)
- Parent peak: Hasenmatt
- Isolation: 5.9 km (3.7 mi)
- Coordinates: 47°15′07″N 7°30′33″E

Geography
- Location within Switzerland
- Location: Solothurn, Switzerland
- Parent range: Jura Mountains

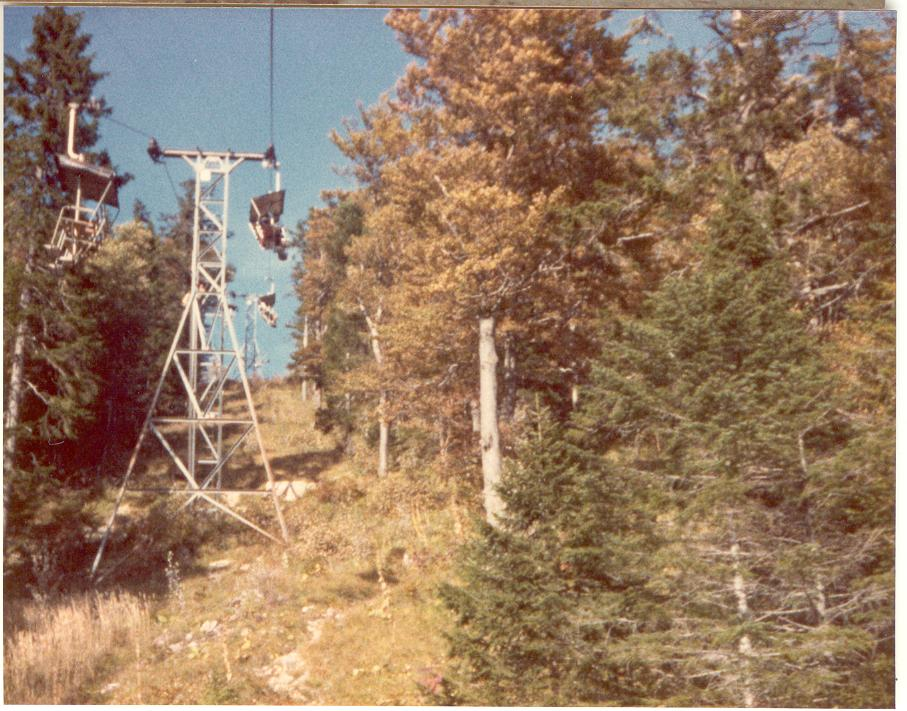
Weissenstein chair lift

The Weissenstein (1,395 m [4,577 ft]) is a mountain of the Jura, located north of Solothurn in the Swiss canton of Solothurn. The culminating point of the chain is distinguished by the name Röti. It is the easternmost summit above 1,300 metres in the Jura Mountains.

Until the end of 2009, there was a 2,339-metre (7,674 ft) chairlift from Oberdorf to the spa hotel on the 1,284-metre-high (4,213 ft) summit near the Weissenstein Pass. It was replaced by a gondola lift at the end of 2014. The tunnel of the railway line Solothurn–Moutier from Oberdorf to Gänsbrunnen on the other side was opened in 1908. The gondola lift crosses the railway track in front of the tunnel portal at Oberdorf, which is the only setting of this kind in Switzerland.

The pass road leading from the village of Oberdorf across the Weissenstein Pass (1,279 m [4,196 ft]) to Gänsbrunnen is one of the steepest in Switzerland (22%).

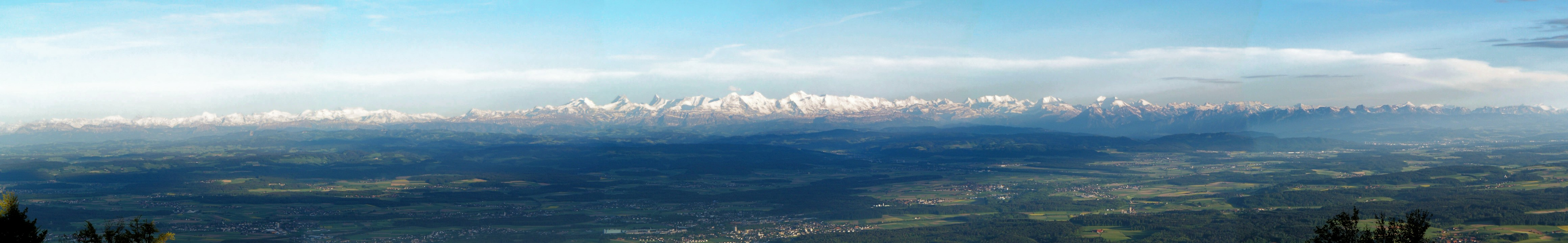
180° Panorama-view at Weissenstein
