= The Dive (1990 film) =

Norwegian action thriller film by Tristan de Vere Cole

- Directed by: Tristan de Vere Cole
- Written by: Leidulv Risan; Carlos Wiggen
- Starring: Bjørn Sundquist; Frank Grimes; Michael Kitchen
- Release date: 31 August 1989
- Running time: 99 minutes
- Country: Norway
- Language: Norwegian
- Budget: £1.8 million

The Dive (Norwegian: Dykket) is a 1989 Norwegian action thriller directed by Tristan de Vere Cole, starring Bjørn Sundquist, Frank Grimes and Michael Kitchen. The movie tells the story of a couple of two deep sea divers and a risky operation at 110 meters.
