= Monte Gambarogno =

Mountain in Switzerland

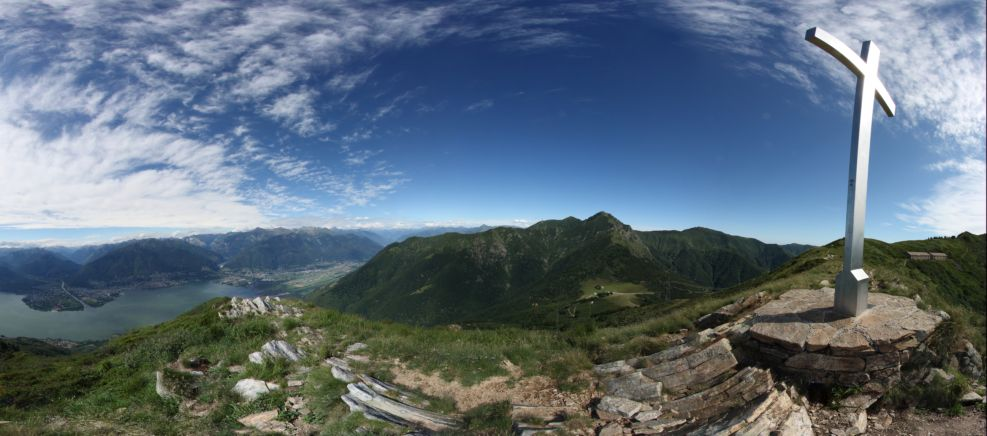
- View from the summit

Highest point
- Elevation: 1,734 m (5,689 ft)
- Prominence: 339 m (1,112 ft)
- Parent peak: Monte Tamaro
- Isolation: 0.34 km (0.21 mi)
- Coordinates: 46°06′44″N 8°49′49″E

Geography
- Location within Switzerland
- Location: Ticino, Switzerland
- Parent range: Lugano Prealps

Monte Gambarogno (1,734 m) is a mountain of the Lugano Prealps, overlooking Lake Maggiore in the canton of Ticino. It lies on the range between Lake Maggiore and Lake Lugano, culminating at Monte Tamaro.

The summit is a popular vantage point and is easily accessible with a road culminating at the Alpe di Neggia (1,395 m).
