= St. Anton Pass =

Mountain pass in Switzerland

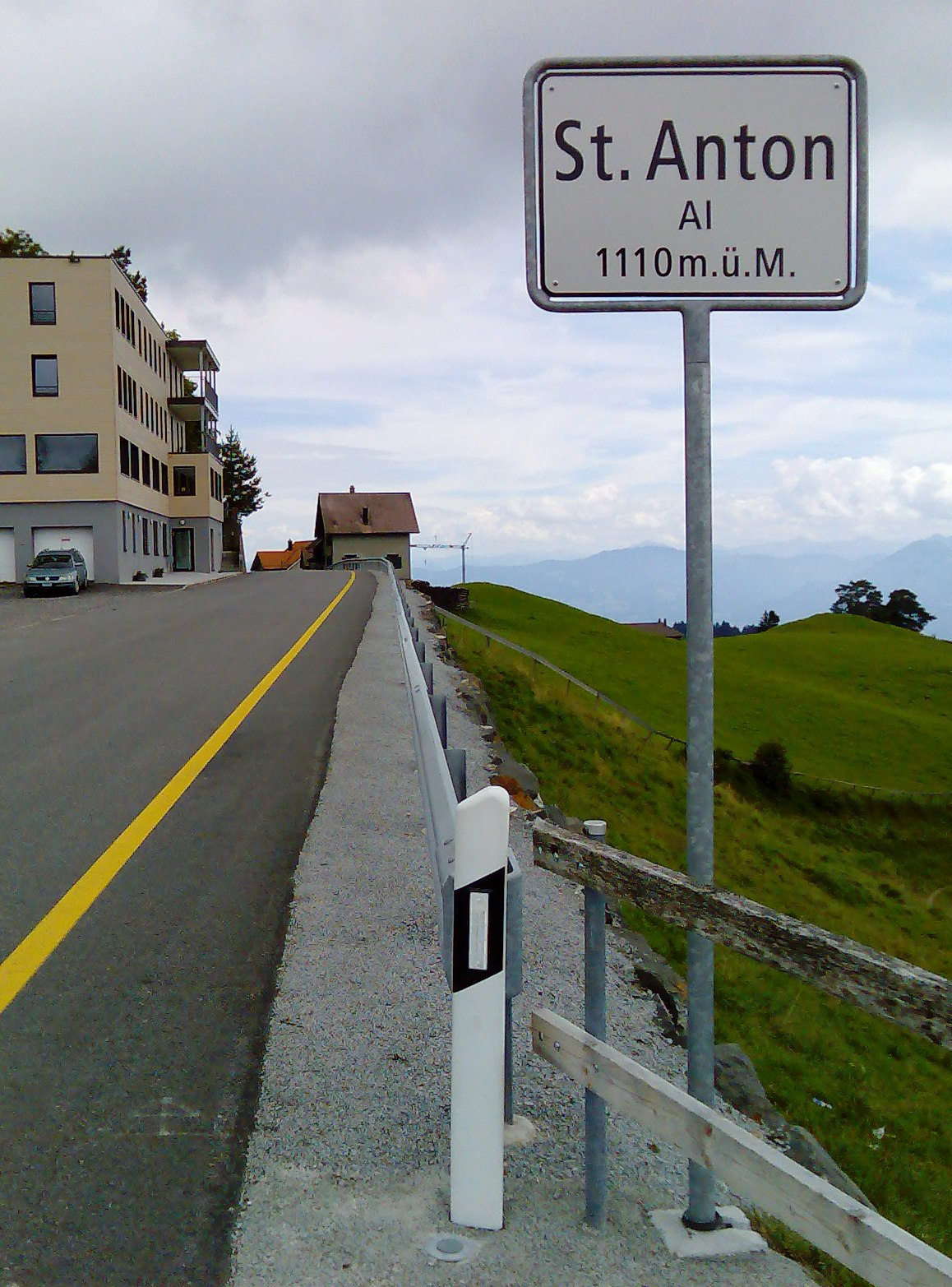

- Location within Alps
- Elevation: 1,110 m (3,640 ft)
- Traversed by: Road

Location
- Location: Switzerland
- Range: Alps
- Coordinates: 47°24′36″N 9°32′02″E

St. Anton Pass (el. 1,110 m.) is a high mountain pass in the Alps between the cantons of Appenzell Innerrhoden and St. Gallen in Switzerland.

It connects Ruppen Pass (St. Gall) and Oberegg (Appenzell Inner Rhodes).

== See also ==
- List of highest paved roads in Europe
- List of mountain passes
- List of the highest Swiss passes

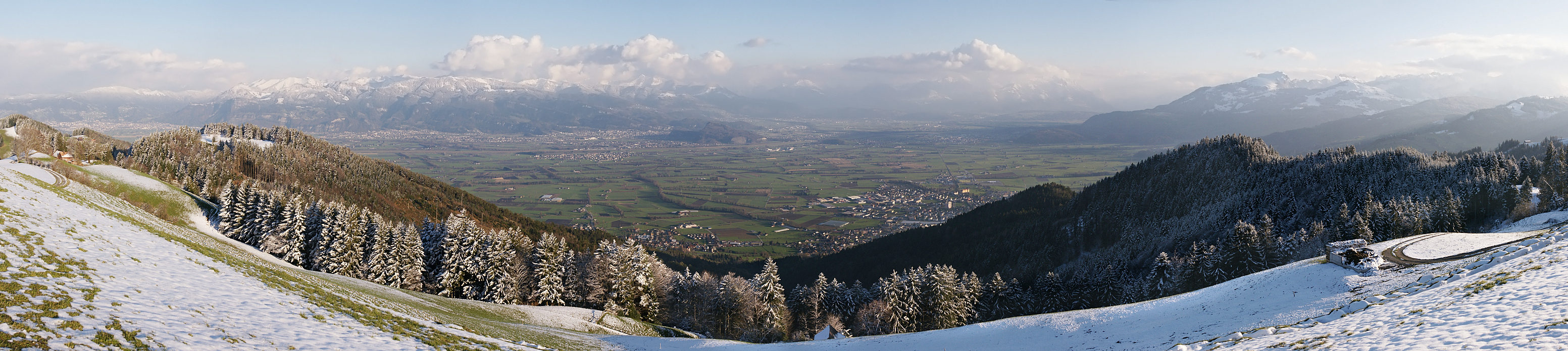
Panorama view from St. Anton to the valley of Rhine
