= Schöllijoch =

High mountain pass in the Pennine Alps

- Interactive map of Schöllijoch
- Elevation: 3,343 metres (10,968 ft)
- Traversed by: Trail (small glacier)

Third Approach
- Location: Switzerland
- Range: Alps
- Coordinates: 46°08′39″N 7°44′00″E

The Schöllijoch (el. 3343 m.) is a high mountain pass in the Pennine Alps, connecting Gruben/Meiden and St. Niklaus (Mattertal) in the canton of Valais in Switzerland. The path has been recently equipped and is accessible to experienced hikers. The path to traverse the Schöllijoch uses fixed ladders, ropes, and rungs.

The pass lies between the Barrhorn on the north and the Brunegghorn on the south.

== See also ==
- List of mountain passes in Switzerland
