= Gottschalkenberg Pass =

- Location within Alps
- Elevation: 1,164 metres (3,819 ft)
- Traversed by: Road

Third Approach
- Location: Switzerland
- Coordinates: 47°09′14″N 8°38′53″E

Gottschalkenberg Pass (el. 1164 m.) is a high mountain pass in the canton of Zug in Switzerland.

Gottschalkenberg is located in the Canton of Zug (specifically the municipality of Menzingen), near the border with the Canton of Zurich. It sits in the pre-Alpine moraine landscape.

== See also ==
- List of highest paved roads in Europe
- List of the highest Swiss passes
