= Raten Pass =

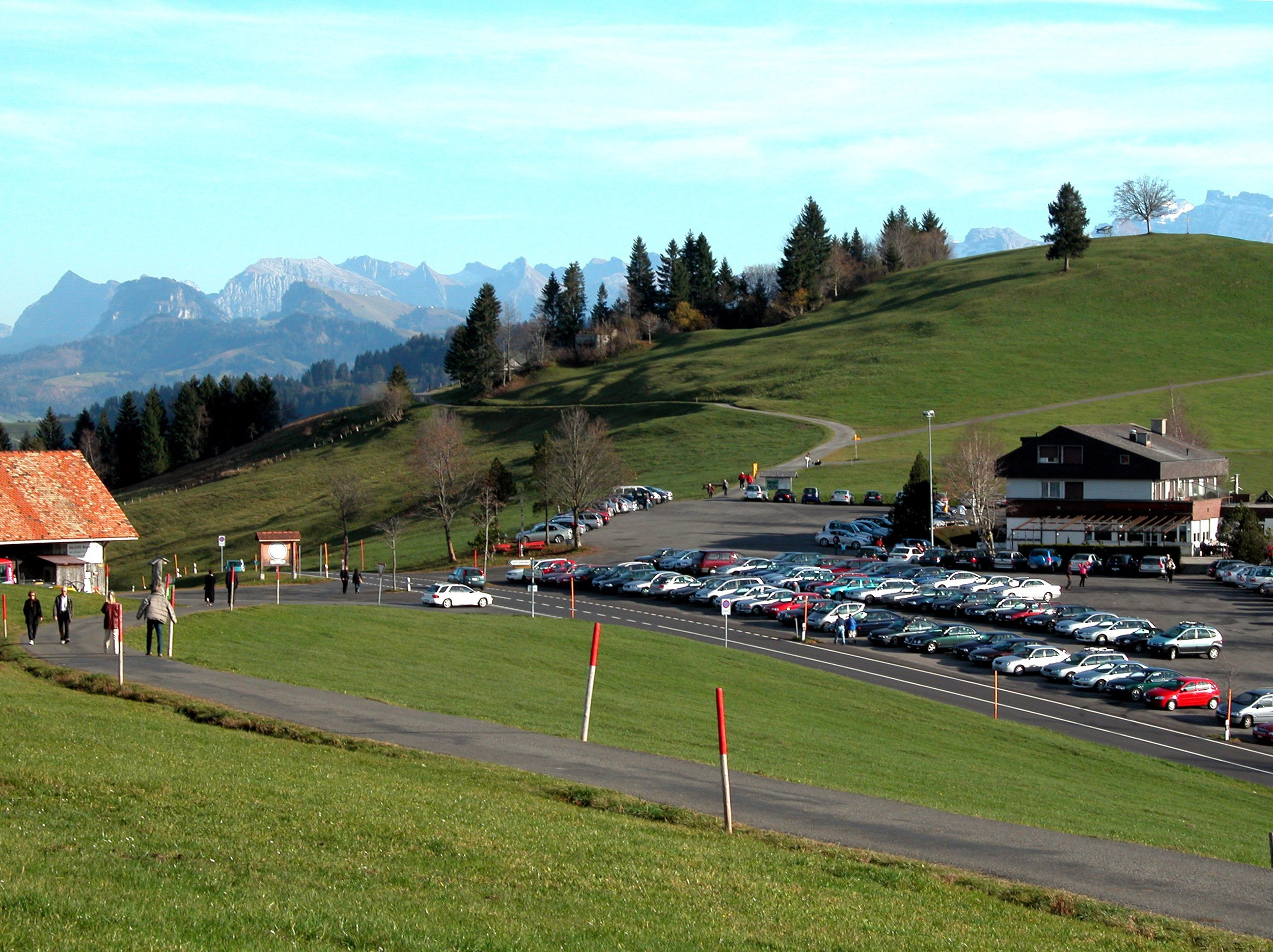
- Raten Pass

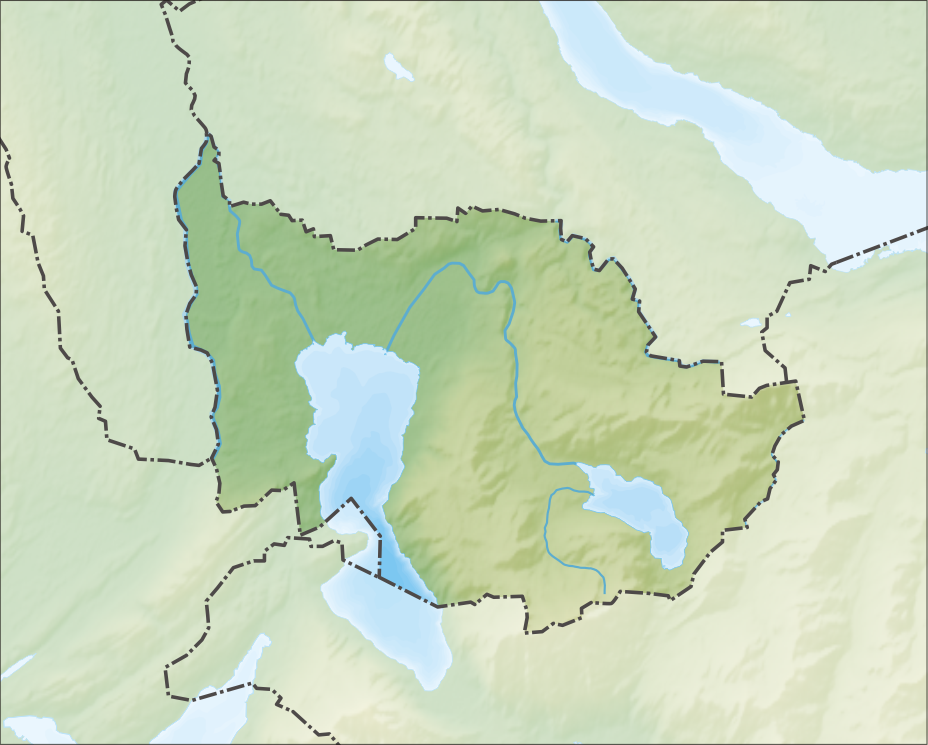
- Location within Canton of Zug Location within Switzerland Location within Alps
- Interactive map of Raten Pass
- Elevation: 1,077 metres (3,533 ft)
- Traversed by: Road

Third Approach
- Location: Switzerland
- Coordinates: 47°8′31″N 08°39′49″E

Raten Pass (el. 1077 m.) is a high mountain pass in the canton of Zug in Switzerland. It connects Oberägeri and Biberbrugg and is often referred to simply as Raten. The pass has a restaurant and hiking trails. The roads between the pass and Oberägeri are called Alosenstrasse and Ratenstrasse. The Rothenthurmer Volksskilauf, a cross-country ski race, has included the Raten Pass as part of its route, though the race has struggled with a lack of snow in recent years.

== See also ==
- List of highest paved roads in Europe
- List of mountain passes
- List of the highest Swiss passes
