= Glaubenberg Pass =

Mountain pass in Switzerland

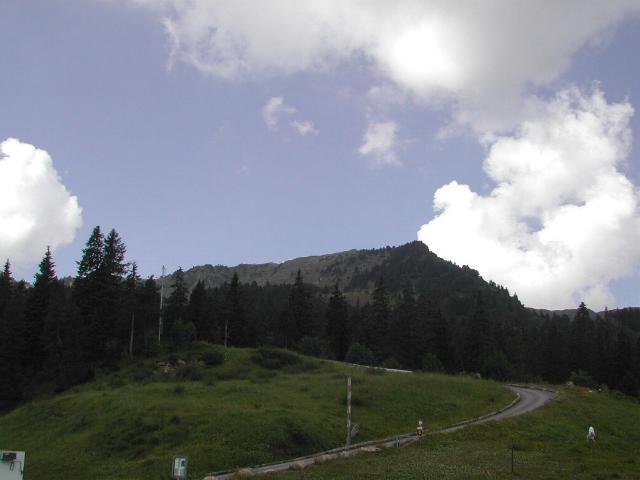
- Glaubenberg

- Location within Switzerland
- Elevation: 1,540 metres (5,050 ft)
- Traversed by: Road

Third Approach
- Location: Lucerne/Obwalden, Switzerland
- Range: Emmental Alps
- Coordinates: 46°53′34″N 08°06′28″E

Glaubenberg Pass (el. 1540 m) is a high mountain pass in the Emmental Alps between the cantons of Lucerne and Obwalden in Switzerland.

It connects Entlebuch and Sarnen.

== See also ==
- List of highest paved roads in Europe
- List of mountain passes
- List of the highest Swiss passes
