= Vue des Alpes =

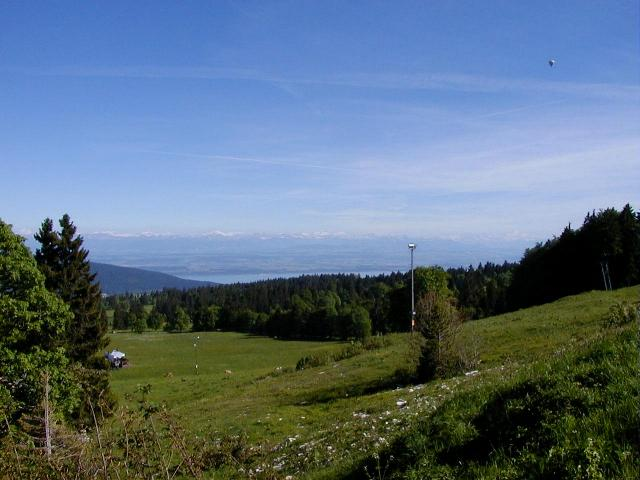
- Vue des Alpes

- Location within Alps
- Elevation: 1,283 metres (4,209 ft)
- Traversed by: Road

Third Approach
- Location: Switzerland
- Range: Jura Mountains
- Coordinates: 47°4′22″N 06°52′11″E

Vue des Alpes (French pronunciation: [vy dez‿alp], lit. 'View of the Alps'; el. 1282 m.) is a high mountain pass in the Jura Mountains in the canton of Neuchâtel, Switzerland.

It connects La Chaux-de-Fonds and Neuchâtel. The pass road has a maximum grade of 10 percent.

A road tunnel for the A20 motorway has greatly reduced the traffic over the pass. At about 1,050 metres above sea level, it is the third highest motorway in Switzerland.

As implied by its name, the pass provides a panoramic view of the Swiss Alps on a clear day.

== See also ==
- List of highest paved roads in Europe
- List of mountain passes
- List of the highest Swiss passes
