= Wildhaus Pass =

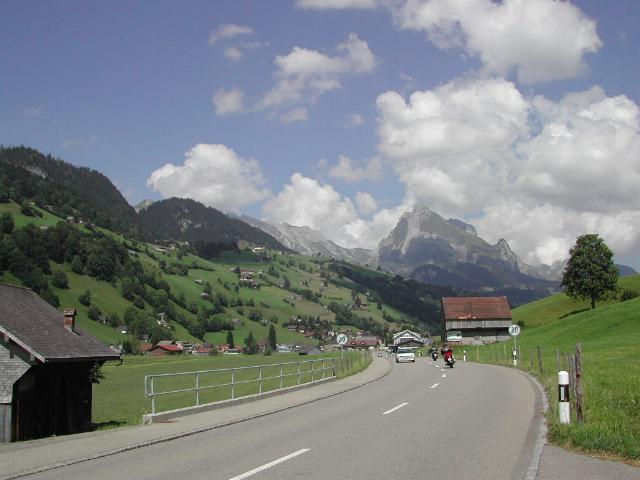
- Wildhaus Pass

- Location within Switzerland
- Elevation: 1,027 metres (3,369 ft)
- Traversed by: Road (1,090 m)

Third Approach
- Location: St. Gallen, Switzerland
- Range: Alps
- Coordinates: 47°12′12″N 9°21′01″E

Wildhaus Pass is a high mountain pass in the Alps in the canton of St. Gallen in Eastern Switzerland. The main road culminates at 1,090 metres, while the pass itself lies at an elevation of 1,027 metres above sea level.

It connects Gams in the Rhine valley and Unterwasser and Wattwil in the Toggenburg. The pass lies between the Säntis and the Churfirsten massifs. The pass road has a maximum grade of 12 percent.

There is a ski resort at the summit in the municipality of Wildhaus.

== See also ==
- List of highest paved roads in Europe
- List of mountain passes
- List of the highest Swiss passes
