= Rüsler Pass =

Mountain pass in the canton of Aargau in Switzerland

Coordinates: 47°26′18″N 8°18′56″E

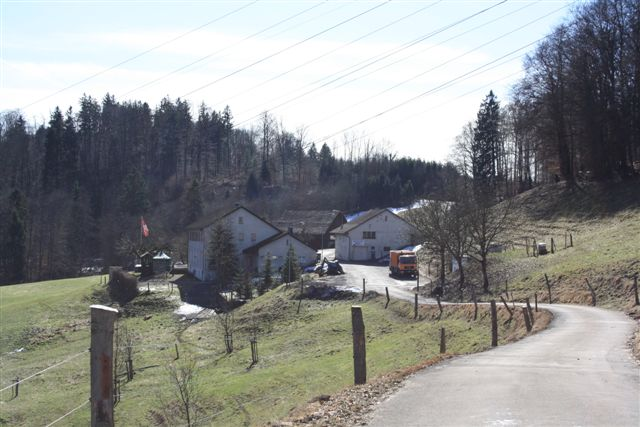
- Interactive map of Rüsler Pass
- Elevation: 649 m (2,129 ft)

Third Approach
- Location: Switzerland

Rüsler Pass (el. 649 m.) is a mountain pass in the canton of Aargau in Switzerland.

It connects Oberrohrdorf and Neuenhof. The pass road is a continuation of the Heitersberg Pass road.

The pass separates the valley of the Reuss from the valley of the Limmat. The road is closed to motorized vehicles.

There is a restaurant at the summit, and it is the trail head for many trails and bike routes.
