= Les Agites =

Mountain pass in Vaud, Switzerland

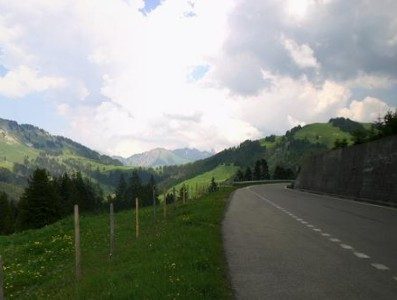
- Road of the pass

- Location within Alps
- Elevation: 1,569 m (5,148 ft)
- Traversed by: Road

Third Approach
- Location: Switzerland
- Range: Alps
- Coordinates: 46°21′51″N 06°57′15″E

Les Agites (el. 1569 m.) is a high mountain pass in the Alps in the canton of Vaud in Switzerland.

It connects Yvorne and La Lécherette.

The south side of the pass road lies in the Rhone valley. It passes through Corbeyrier and a 300-metre tunnel before reaching the summit. The tunnel is open to one-way traffic only, based on signs posted with allowable times of passage at both ends.

The north side is substantially flatter, passing on the south shore of the Lac de l'Hongrin. This part of the road is open to private motorized vehicles only in summer. Near La Lécherette, the road meets the pass road that crosses the Col des Mosses.

== See also ==
- List of highest paved roads in Europe
- List of mountain passes
- List of the highest Swiss passes
