= Lenzerheide (pass) =

Mountain pass in Switzerland

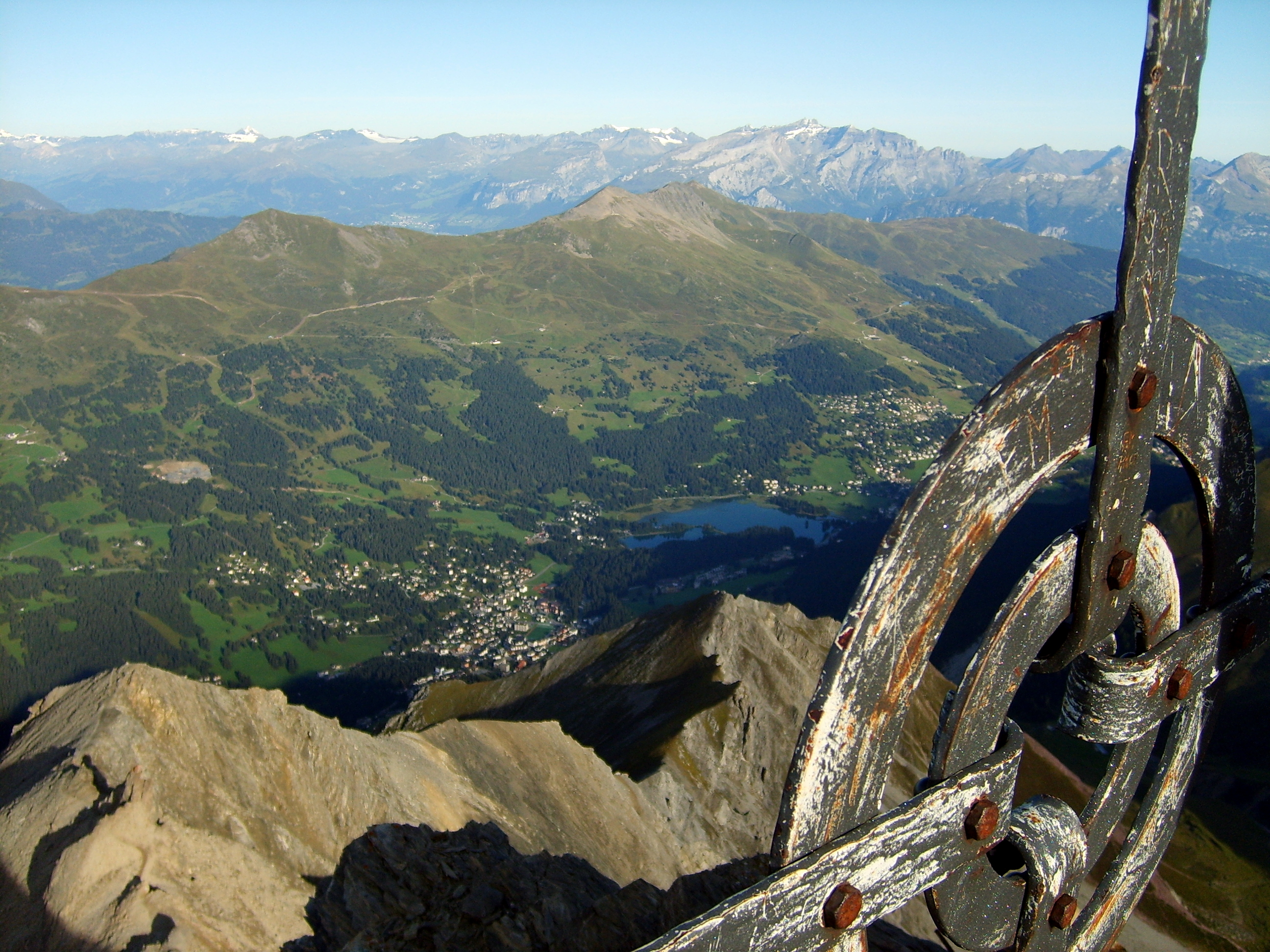
- The road to Lenzerheide in the foreground offers a shorter connection to north (right) compared to the water of the lake which runs south (to the left) and all around the massive behind it, ending north of it.

- Location within Switzerland
- Elevation: 1,549 metres (5,082 ft)
- Traversed by: Road

Third Approach
- Location: Graubünden, Switzerland
- Range: Alps
- Coordinates: 46°45′N 09°34′E

Lenzerheide is the common name of a passage past a high mountain pass in the Alps in the canton of Graubünden in Switzerland, reaching summit at 1549 m between Valbella and Parpan, approximately 5 kilometers south of the resort of Lenzerheide.

The road connects Chur in the valley of the Rhine and Tiefencastel in the valley of the Albula, which is actually a tributary to the Rhine. The pass nevertheless offered a shortcut which additionally avoided the gorge "Schinschlucht" with its difficult terrain in the past. Nowadays most traffic to Tiefencastel would use the A13 motorway to Thusis to get to Tiefencastel on a main road.

The Lenzerheide road has a maximum grade of 11 percent and is open year-round, though road conditions frequently necessitate winter tires, especially between December and March. Due to the local settlements nobody ever bothered to call the summit near Lenzerheide a mountain pass nor would an official document call it a pass. It will also not appear on road pass opening charts.

The mountain Piz Scalottas (el 2321 m.) offers a good view to overlook both routes via Lenzerheide or the Schinschlucht gorge. If you climbed the Lenzerheide pass road by mountain bike, the chairlift to Piz Scalottas will transport your mountain bike for free to the summit.

== See also ==
- List of highest paved roads in Europe
- List of mountain passes
- List of the highest Swiss passes
