= Col des Etroits =

Mountain pass in Switzerland

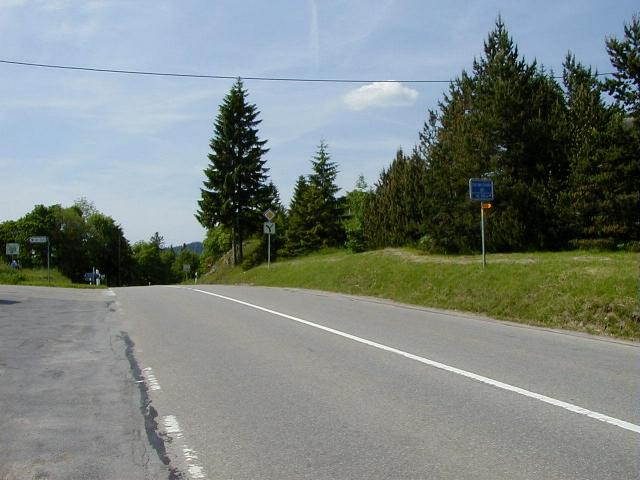
- Col des Etroits

- Location within Alps
- Elevation: 1,152 m (3,780 ft)
- Traversed by: Road

Third Approach
- Location: Switzerland
- Range: Jura Mountains
- Coordinates: 46°49′47.89″N 06°29′41.8″E

Col des Etroits (el. 1,152 metres (3,780 ft)) is a high mountain pass in the Jura Mountains in the canton of Vaud in Switzerland.←

It connects Yverdon and Fleurier.

== See also ==
- List of highest paved roads in Europe
- List of mountain passes
- List of the highest Swiss passes
