= Col de l'Aiguillon =

Mountain pass in Vaud, Switzerland

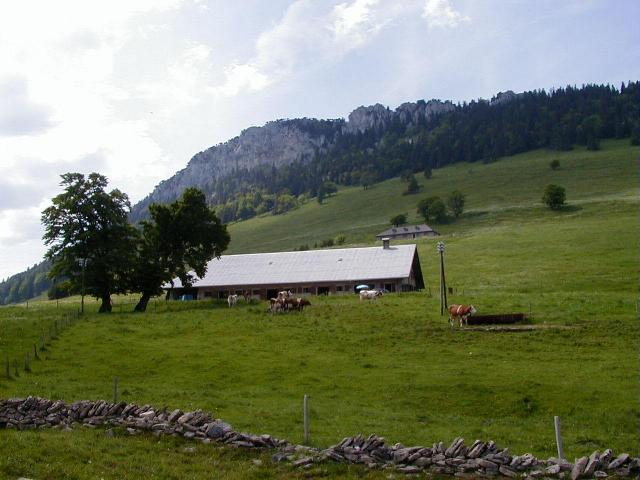

- Location within Alps
- Elevation: 1,293 m (4,242 ft)
- Traversed by: Road

Third Approach
- Location: Switzerland
- Range: Jura Mountains
- Coordinates: 46°47′22″N 6°27′34″E

Col de l'Aiguillon (French pronunciation: [kɔl də lɛɡɥijɔ̃]; el. 1293 m.) is a Swiss pass in the Jura Mountains in the canton of Vaud.

The pass connects L'Auberson and Baulmes. The road is 13.7 km long and has a maximum grade of 18 percent.

The cliff between the Col de l'Aiguillon and the highest point in the neighboring mountains, the Aiguilles de Baulmes, is a popular climbing wall for mountaineers.

== See also ==
- List of highest paved roads in Europe
- List of mountain passes
- List of the highest Swiss passes
