= Col de la Croix (Vaud) =

Mountain pass in the Swiss Alps

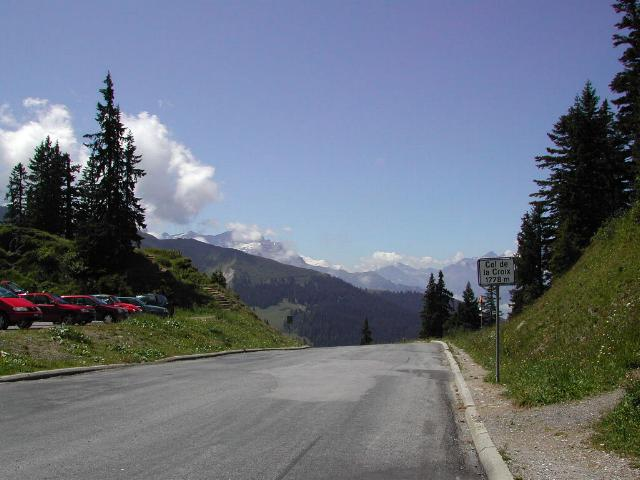
- Col de la Croix, looking towards west (Villars-sur Ollon)

- Location within Switzerland
- Elevation: 1,778 metres (5,833 ft)
- Traversed by: Road

Third Approach
- Location: Vaud, Switzerland
- Range: Alps
- Coordinates: 46°19′29″N 07°07′36″E

Col de la Croix (1778 m high) is an Alpine pass in the canton of Vaud in Switzerland.

It connects Bex and Villars-sur-Ollon with Les Diablerets.

== Cycle racing ==
=== Details of the climb ===
The climb from Les Diablerets is 8 km. long, gaining 580 m in height at an average 7.2% grade. Several sections of the climb are well in excess of this with the maximum gradient of 12%.

=== Tour de France ===
It was crossed in Stage 9 of the 2022 Tour de France on 10 July, where Simon Geschke was the first rider to reach the top of the col. It was ranked as a Category 1 climb.

== See also ==
- List of highest paved roads in Europe
- List of mountain passes
- List of the highest Swiss passes
