= Col du Mont d'Orzeires =

Mountain pass in Switzerland

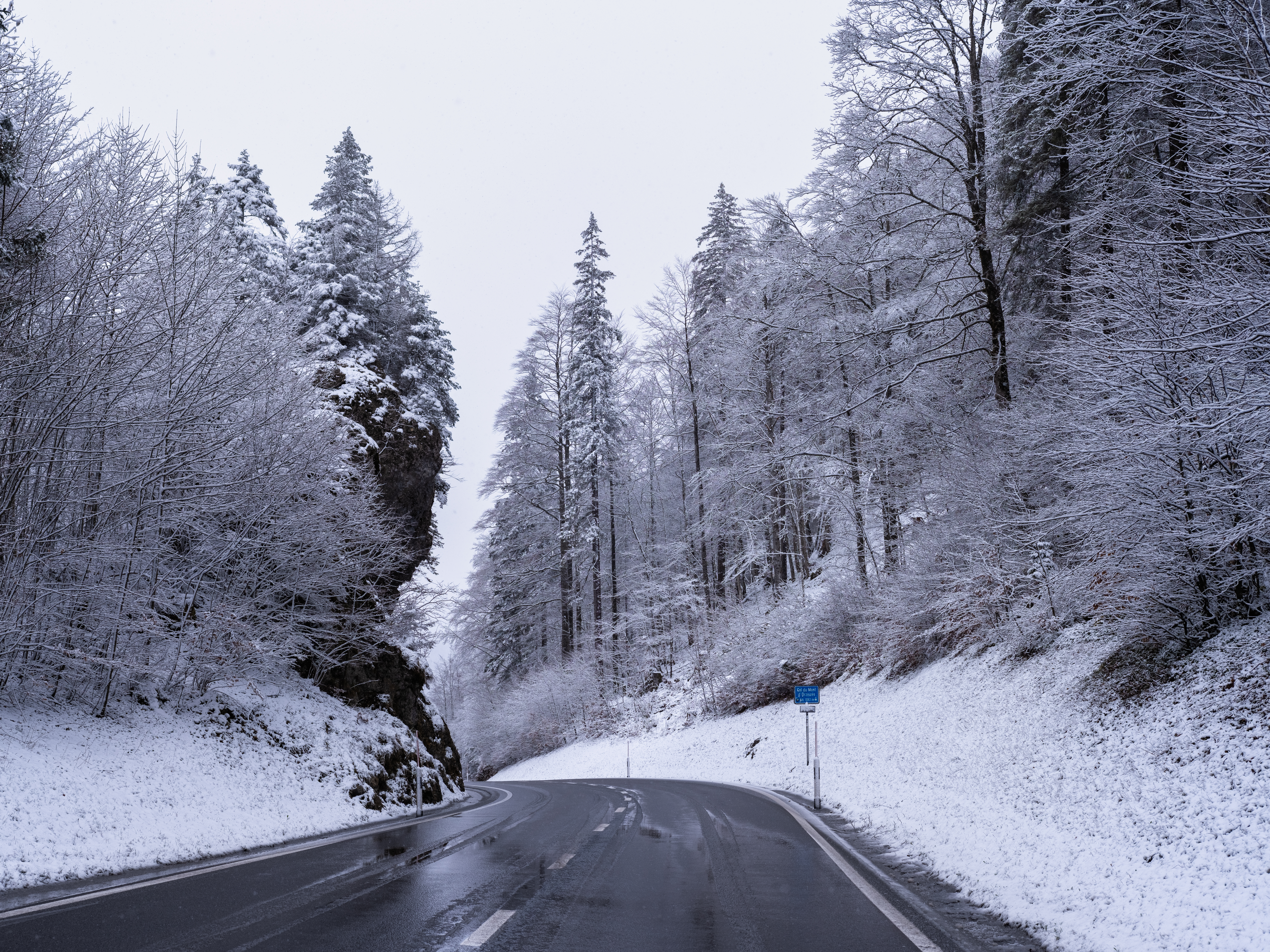

- Location within Alps
- Elevation: 1,060 metres (3,480 ft)
- Traversed by: Road

Third Approach
- Location: Switzerland
- Range: Jura Mountains
- Coordinates: 46°41′07″N 6°20′13″E

Col du Mont d'Orzeires (el. 1060 m.) is a high mountain pass in the Jura Mountains in the canton of Vaud in Switzerland.

The pass road runs on side road 152a from Le Pont (1008 m a.s.l.), a village in the municipality of L'Abbaye, northeast along lake Brenet, over the Col du Mont d'Orzeires, past Pierre Punex (1061 m a.s.l.) and continues to Chalêt du Mont d'Orzeires (1029 m a.s.l.), where the Juraparc animal park is located. After a few bends, the road runs from a height of 950 m a.s.l. to the east to La Dernier (764 m a.s.l.) and Vallorbe (749 m a.s.l.). The pass connects the Valle de Joux through the narrows between the Risoux range and the Dent de Vaulion (1483 m a.s.l.) with main road 9 near Vallorbe.

== Tunnel ==
The Pont–Vallorbe Railway (Chemin de fer Pont–Vallorbe) built a railway tunnel through the Mont d'Orzeires, which is traversed by trains on the Vallorbe–Le Brassus railway line. The tunnel was built in response to a petition from the residents of the valleys of 1867 and opened in 1886. It had a dual function, as it was not only serve the railway but, in the case of an extraordinary flood, it could also be used to empty water from the two lakes.

== See also ==
- List of highest paved roads in Europe
- List of mountain passes
- List of the highest Swiss passes
