= Ächerli Pass =

Mountain pass in Unterwalden, Switzerland

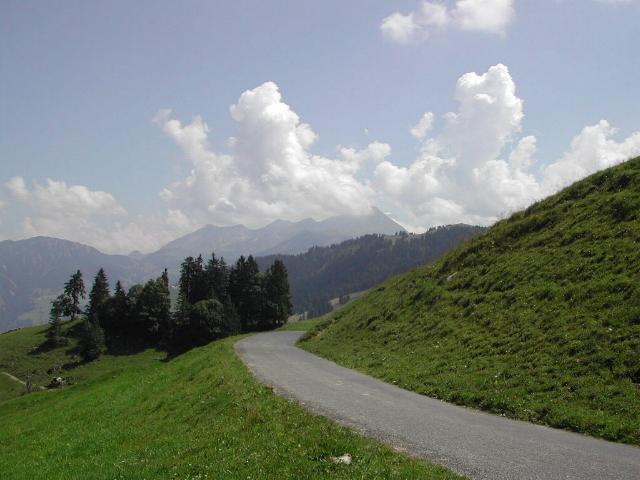
- Ächerli Pass

- Location within Alps
- Elevation: 1,398 metres (4,587 ft)
- Traversed by: Road

Third Approach
- Location: Switzerland
- Range: Alps
- Coordinates: 46°54′16″N 08°20′05″E

Ächerli Pass (el. 1398 m.) is a high mountain pass between the cantons of Obwalden and Nidwalden.

It connects Kerns in the canton of Obwalden and Dallenwil in the canton of Nidwalden. The pass road has grades of up to 15 percent. From the road, peaks such as Pilatus, Rigi, Buochserhorn, Titlis, and Stanserhorn are visible.

== See also ==
- List of highest paved roads in Europe
- List of mountain passes
- List of the highest Swiss passes
