= Sattelegg Pass =

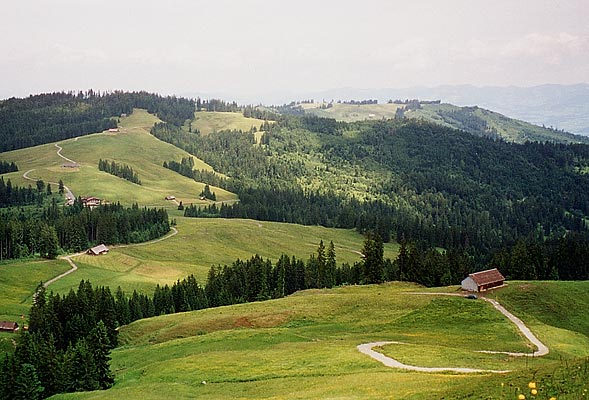
- Sattelegg Pass

- Location within Alps
- Elevation: 1,190 m (3,900 ft)
- Traversed by: Road

Location
- Location: Switzerland
- Range: Alps
- Coordinates: 47°07′38″N 08°50′48″E

Sattelegg Pass (el. 1,190 m.) is a high mountain pass in the Alps in the canton of Schwyz in Switzerland, connecting Siebnen and Willerzell. The road has a maximum grade of 14%.

On the Sattelegg is a restaurant, a small chapel, and a ski elevator.

== See also ==
- List of highest paved roads in Europe
- List of mountain passes
- List of the highest Swiss passes
