= Motta, Graubünden =

Hamlet in Grisons, Switzerland

Coordinates: 46.2742°N 10.1151°E

La Motta is a hamlet in Val Poschiavo, Grisons, Switzerland located on the south side of Lago di Poschiavo. It belongs to the municipality of Brusio.
