= Wiggen =

Wiggen is a surname. Notable people with the surname include:

== People ==
- Carlos Wiggen (born 1950), Norwegian novelist
- Knut Wiggen (1927– 2016), Norwegian-Swedish composer
- Trine Wiggen (born 1968), Norwegian actress
- Ulla Wiggen (born 1942), Swedish painter

== Fictional characters ==
- Henry Wiggen, fictional baseball player in the novels by the American writer Mark Harris
