= Weissenstein Pass =

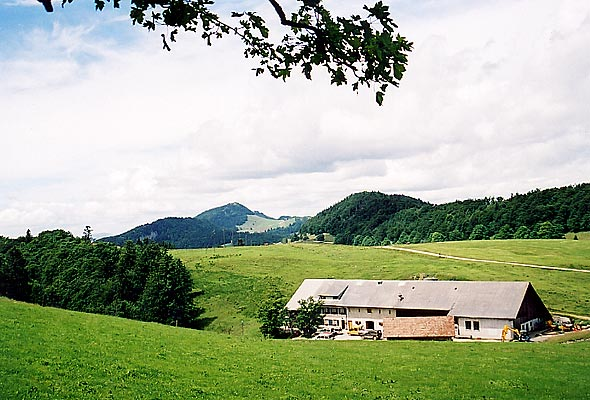

- Location within Alps
- Elevation: 1,279 metres (4,196 ft)
- Traversed by: Road

Third Approach
- Location: Switzerland
- Range: Jura Mountains
- Coordinates: 47°15′00″N 07°32′00″E

Weissenstein Pass (el. 1279 m.) is a high mountain pass in the Jura Mountains in the canton of Solothurn in Switzerland.

It connects Oberdorf and Gänsbrunnen. The pass road has a maximum grade of 22 percent and is one of the steepest roads in Switzerland.

== See also ==
- List of highest paved roads in Europe
- List of mountain passes
- List of the highest Swiss passes
