= Moosalp =

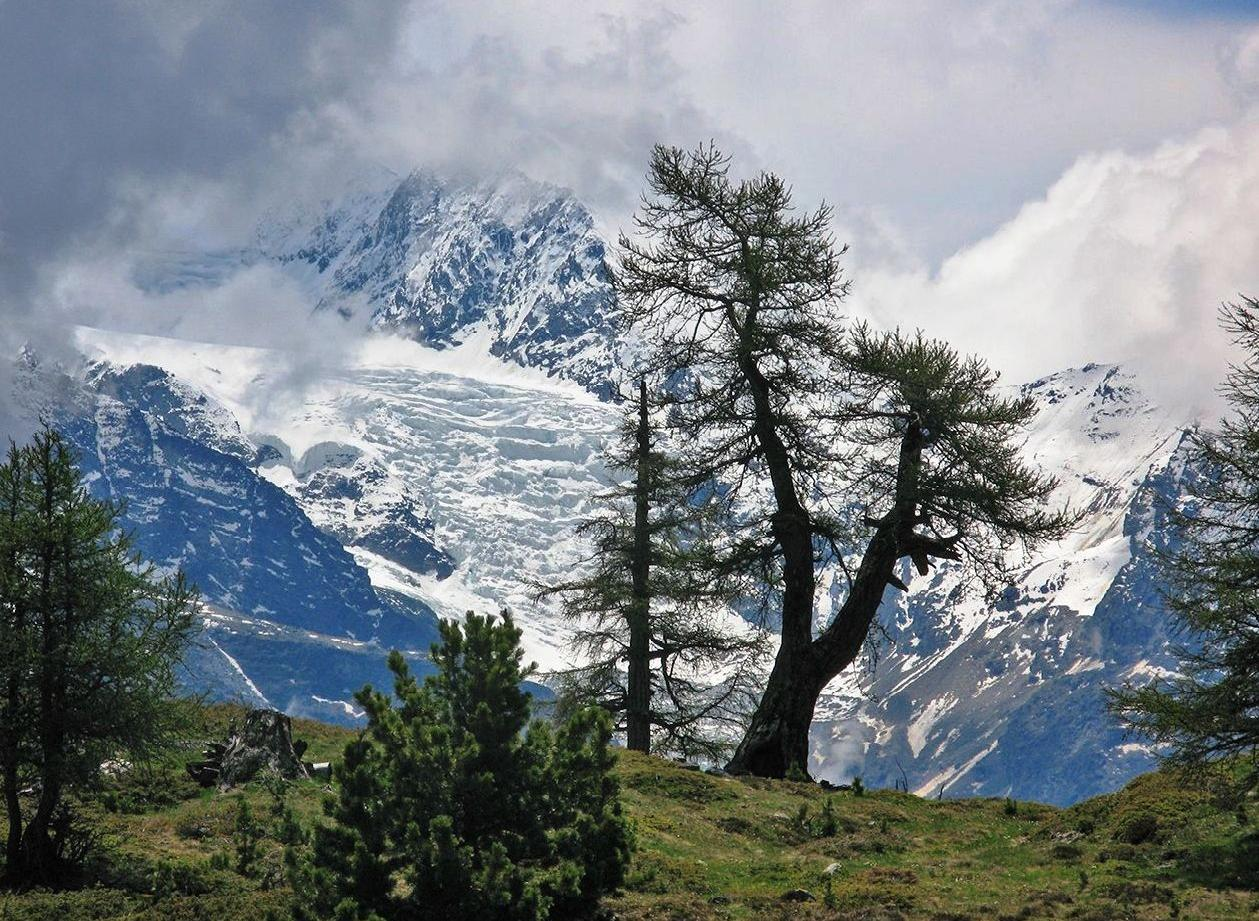
- View from the Moosalp

- Location within Alps
- Elevation: 2,048 metres (6,719 ft)
- Traversed by: Road

Third Approach
- Location: Switzerland
- Range: Alps
- Coordinates: 46°15′05″N 7°49′47″E

The Moosalp (el. 2048 m.) is a high mountain pass across the western Pennine Alps, connecting Bürchen with Törbel in the canton of Valais in Switzerland.

The pass lies north-east of Augstbordhorn.

== See also ==
- List of highest paved roads in Europe
- List of mountain passes
