= Col du Mont Crosin =

Mountain pass Bern, Switzerland

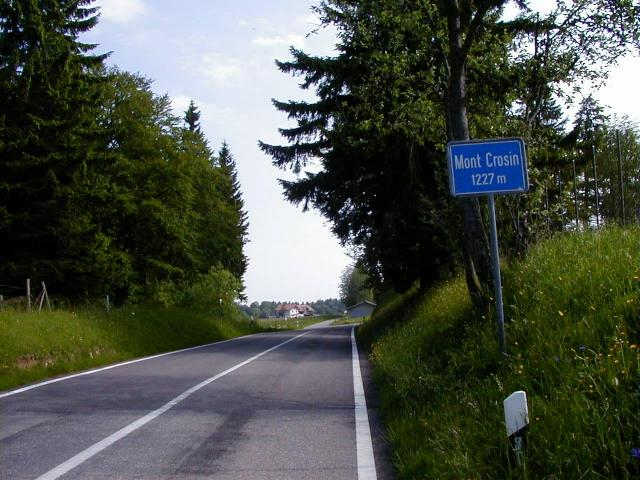

- Location within Canton of Bern Location within Switzerland Location within Alps
- Elevation: 1,227 m (4,026 ft)
- Traversed by: Road

Location
- Location: Switzerland
- Range: Jura Mountains
- Coordinates: 47°11′28″N 07°06′1″E

Col du Mont Crosin (el. 1,227 m.) is a high mountain pass in the Jura Mountains in the canton of Bern in Switzerland.

== See also ==
- List of highest paved roads in Europe
- List of mountain passes
- List of the highest Swiss passes
