= Col du Marchairuz =

Mountain pass in Switzerland

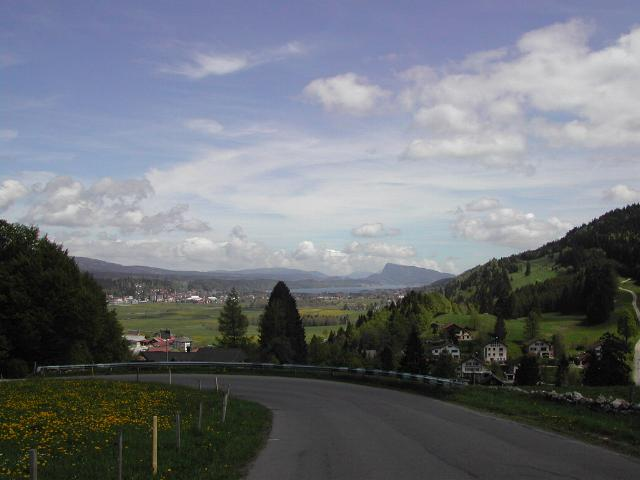
- Col du Marchairuz

- Location within Alps
- Elevation: 1,447 metres (4,747 ft)
- Traversed by: Road

Third Approach
- Location: Switzerland
- Range: Jura Mountains
- Coordinates: 46°33′9.57″N 06°15′1.6″E

Col du Marchairuz (elevation 1,447 m (4,747 ft)) is a high mountain pass in the Jura Mountains in the canton of Vaud in Switzerland.

It connects Le Brassus and Bière. The pass road has a maximum grade of 14 percent.

== See also ==
- List of highest paved roads in Europe
- List of mountain passes
- List of the highest Swiss passes
