= Balmberg Pass =

Mountain pass

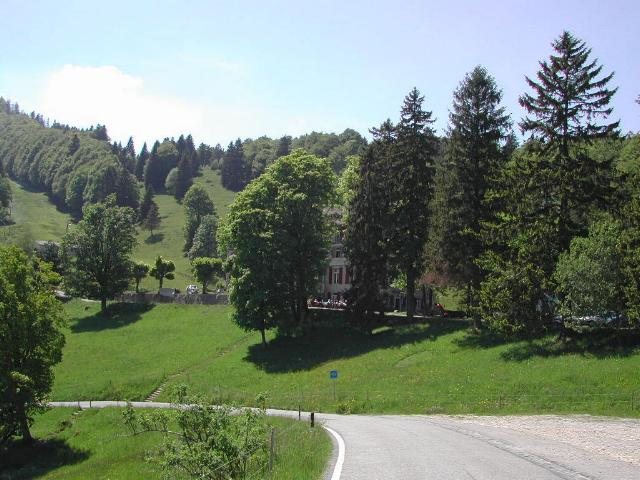
- Balmberg Pass

- Location within Alps
- Elevation: 1,078 metres (3,537 ft)
- Traversed by: Road

Third Approach
- Location: Switzerland
- Range: Jura Mountains
- Coordinates: 47°15′58.06″N 07°32′22.23″E

Balmberg Pass (elevation 1078 m) is a high mountain pass in the Jura Mountains in the canton of Solothurn in Switzerland.

It connects Welschenrohr and Günsberg. The road is one of the steepest pass roads in Switzerland, with gradients of up to 25%. The road is not recommended for novice drivers, big, wide or long vehicles, buses, vans and trucks, caravans, or trailers. It is however, ideal for motorcycles. Oncoming traffic in the middle or on the wrong side of the road can sometimes be encountered, especially in the bends. During periods of snow or ice, the road is closed from the pass summit to Welschenrohr on the north side.

== See also ==
- List of highest paved roads in Europe
- List of mountain passes
- List of the highest Swiss passes
