= Wolfgang Pass =

Mountain pass in Grisons, Switzerland

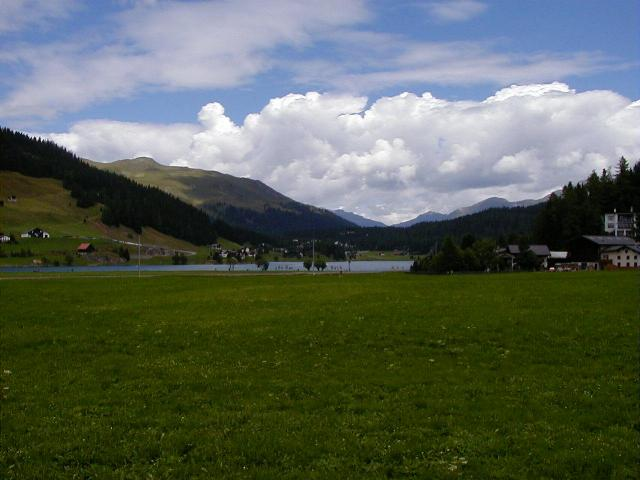
- Wolfgang Pass

- Location within Switzerland
- Elevation: 1,632 metres (5,354 ft)
- Traversed by: Road and rail

Third Approach
- Location: Graubünden, Switzerland
- Range: Swiss Alps
- Coordinates: 46°50′N 09°51′E

Aerial view from 2500 m by Walter Mittelholzer (1925)

Wolfgang Pass (1,632 m (5,354 ft)) is a high mountain pass in the eastern Swiss Alps in the canton of Grisons in Switzerland.

It connects Klosters and Davos with Davos being almost level with the pass. The pass road has a maximum grade of 10 percent and is kept open year-round.

A line of the Rhaetian Railway also crosses the pass since 1890.

The pass is comparatively low as a mountain pass and was historically used also for international trade via the southern adjacent Scaletta Pass and later via the newly built road across Flüela Pass from 1868. This road is still closed nowadays in winter and motorists are forced to use the Car shuttle train through the Vereina Tunnel (or drive a long detour via Julier pass).

== See also ==
- List of highest paved roads in Europe
- List of mountain passes
- List of the highest Swiss passes
