= Chatzenstrick Pass =

Mountain pass in Schwyz, Switzerland

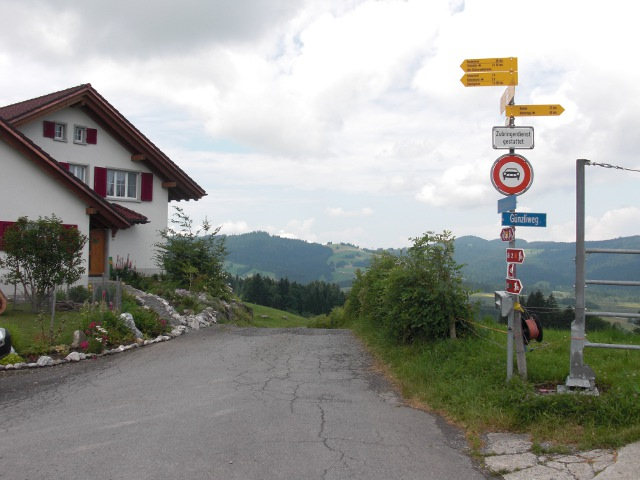
- Summit

- Location within Switzerland
- Elevation: 1,053 m (3,455 ft)
- Traversed by: Road

Third Approach
- Location: Schwyz, Switzerland
- Range: Alps
- Coordinates: 47°08′11″N 8°43′19″E

Chatzenstrick Pass (el. 1053 m.) is a mountain pass in the Alps in the canton of Schwyz in Switzerland.

It connects Einsiedeln and Altmatt and was a route of pilgrimage to the abbey at Einsiedeln.

== See also ==
- List of the highest Swiss passes
