= Schwarzenbühl Pass =

- Location within Alps
- Elevation: 1,547 metres (5,075 ft)
- Traversed by: Road

Third Approach
- Location: Switzerland
- Range: Alps
- Coordinates: 46°45′N 07°23′E

Schwarzenbühl Pass (el. 1547 m.) is a high mountain pass in the Alps in the canton of Bern in Switzerland.

It connects Riffenmatt in the municipality of Guggisberg, south of Bern and Gurnigel Pass.

There is a ski resort at the pass, with a hotel with a hot steam bath, a restaurant, and a sanatorium.

== See also ==
- List of highest paved roads in Europe
- List of mountain passes
- List of the highest Swiss passes
