= Schallenberg Pass =

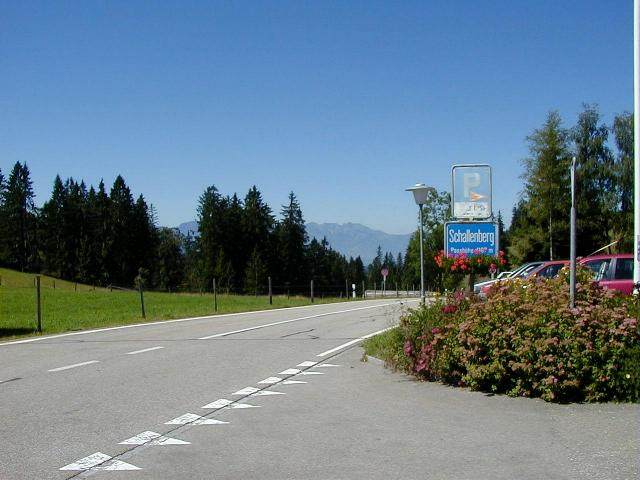
- Schallenberg Pass

- Location within Alps
- Elevation: 1,167 metres (3,829 ft)
- Traversed by: Road

Third Approach
- Location: Switzerland
- Coordinates: 46°49′34″N 07°47′50″E

Schallenberg Pass (el. 1167 m.) is a high mountain pass in the canton of Berne in Switzerland.

It connects Steffisburg and Marbach. The pass road has a maximum grade of 10 percent.

== See also ==
- List of highest paved roads in Europe
- List of mountain passes
- List of the highest Swiss passes
