= Pas de Lona =

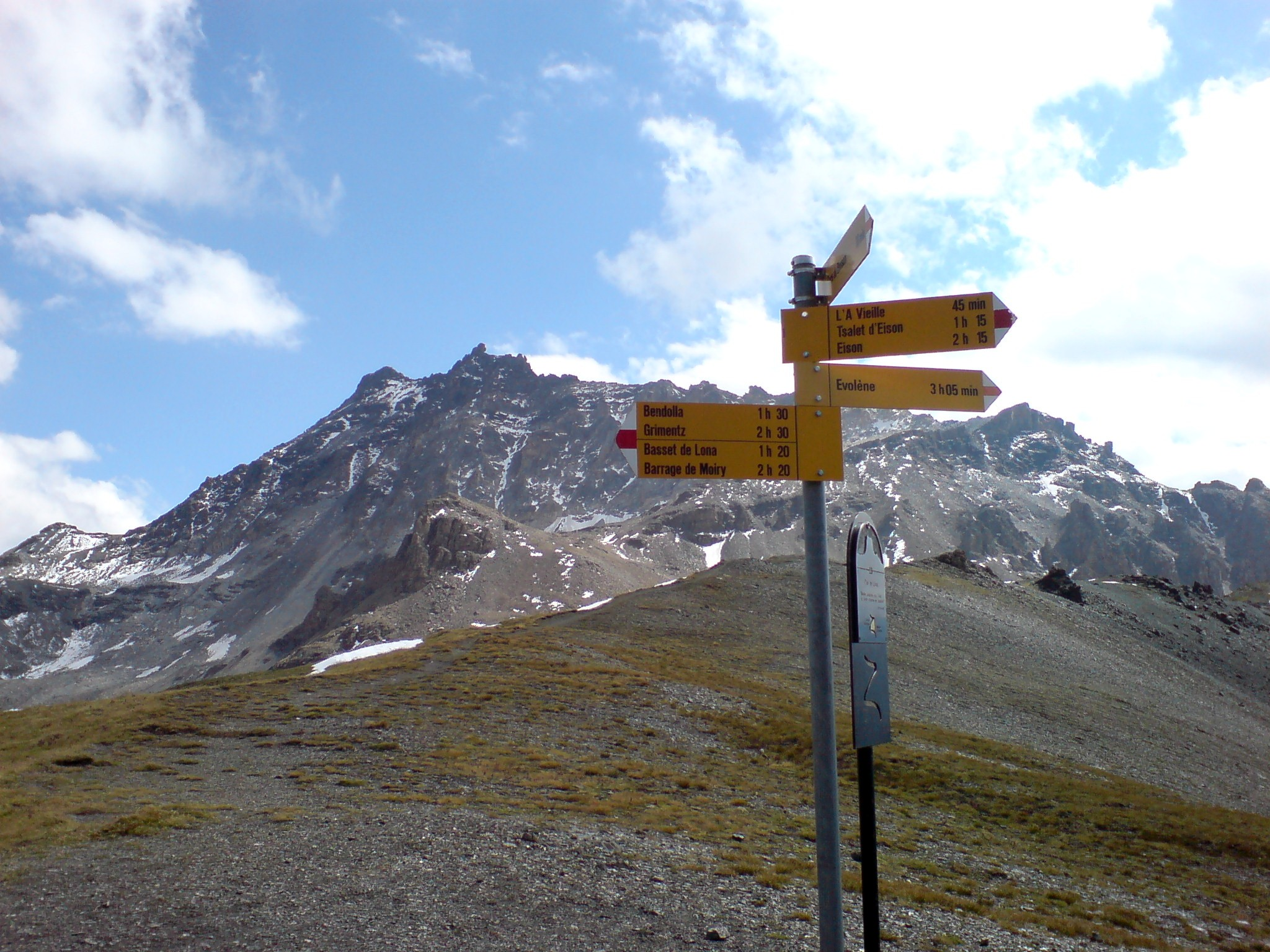
- View of the Sasseneire from the pass

- Location within Switzerland
- Elevation: 2,787 metres (9,144 ft)
- Traversed by: Trail

Third Approach
- Location: Valais, Switzerland
- Range: Pennine Alps
- Coordinates: 46°09′20″N 7°31′12″E

The Pas de Lona (2,787 m) is a high mountain pass across the Pennine Alps, located in the canton of Valais. It connects Saint-Martin with Grimentz and is the lowest pass between the valleys of Herens and Anniviers. The pass is overlooked by the Becs de Bosson (north) and the Sasseneire (south).
