= Col de la Givrine =

High mountain pass over the Jura in canton of Vaud, Switzerland

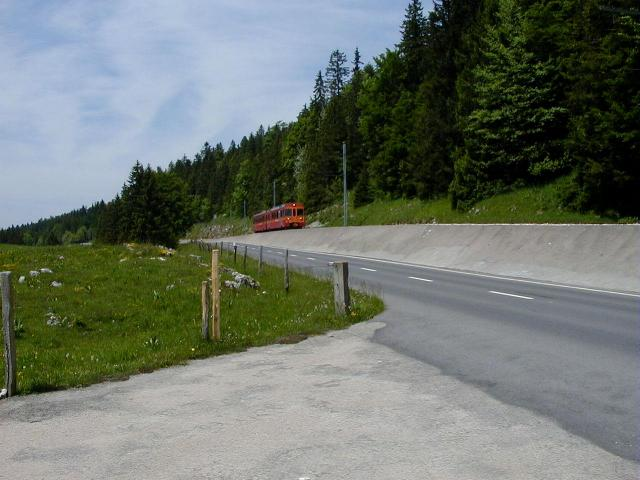
- Col de la Givrine

- Location within Switzerland
- Elevation: 1,228 metres (4,029 ft)
- Traversed by: Road, rail

Third Approach
- Location: Vaud, Switzerland
- Range: Jura Mountains
- Coordinates: 46°27′20.14″N 6°05′24.86″E

Col de la Givrine (el. 1228 m.) is a high mountain pass in the Jura Mountains in the canton of Vaud in Switzerland, near the border with France.

It connects Nyon in Switzerland and Morez in France. The maximum grade of the pass road is 8 percent. The pass is crossed by the Nyon–St-Cergue–La Cure railway, although the railway stops at the French border. It is the highest railway in the Jura Mountains.

== See also ==
- List of highest paved roads in Europe
- List of mountain passes
- List of the highest Swiss passes
