= Les Pontins =

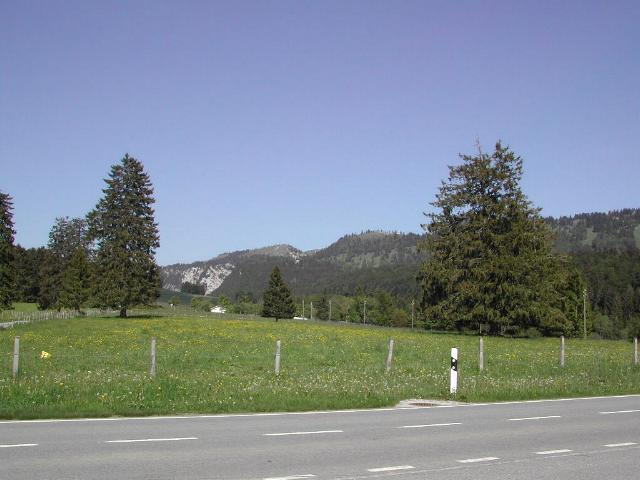
- Les Pontins

- Location within Alps
- Elevation: 1,110 metres (3,640 ft)
- Traversed by: Road

Third Approach
- Location: Switzerland
- Range: Jura Mountains
- Coordinates: 47°7′53.29″N 06°59′50.75″E

Les Pontins (el. 1110 m.) is a high mountain pass in the Jura Mountains in the canton of Berne in Switzerland.

== See also ==
- List of highest paved roads in Europe
- List of mountain passes
- List of the highest Swiss passes
