= La Tourne =

Mountain pass in Switzerland

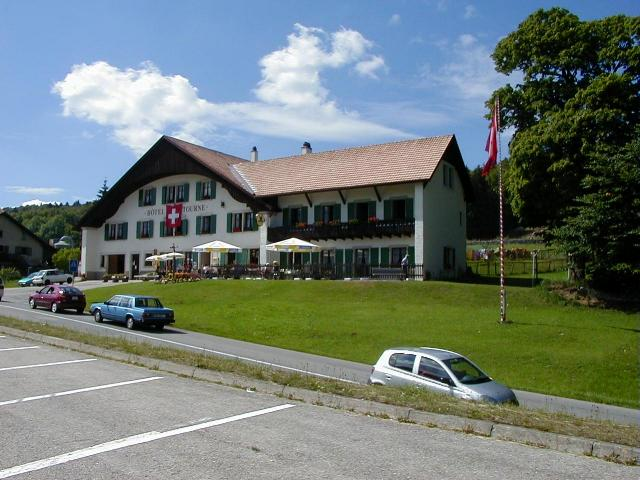
- La Tourne

- Location within Alps
- Elevation: 1,170 metres (3,840 ft)
- Traversed by: Road

Third Approach
- Location: Switzerland
- Range: Jura Mountains
- Coordinates: 46°59′17.03″N 06°47′31.94″E

La Tourne (el. 1170 m.) is a high mountain pass in the Jura Mountains in the canton of Neuchâtel in Switzerland.

It connects Les Ponts-de-Martel and Montmollin. The pass road has a maximum grade of 10 percent.

== See also ==
- List of highest paved roads in Europe
- List of mountain passes
- List of the highest Swiss passes
