= Champex Pass =

- Location within Switzerland
- Elevation: 1,490 metres (4,890 ft)
- Traversed by: Road

Third Approach
- Location: Valais, Switzerland
- Range: Alps
- Coordinates: 46°1′55″N 7°6′25″E

Champex Pass (French: "Col de Champex") (el. 1470 m.) is a high mountain pass in the Alps in the canton of Valais in Switzerland.

It is near the village of Champex-Lac.

== See also ==
- List of highest paved roads in Europe
- List of mountain passes
