= L'Auberson =

Settlement in Sainte-Croix in Canton Waadt, Switzerland

- Location of L'Auberson in Switzerland
- Coordinates: 46.8178°N 6.4594°E
- Country: Switzerland
- Canton: Vaud
- District: Jura-Nord vaudois
- Municipality: Sainte-Croix

L'Auberson (French pronunciation: [lobɛʁsɔ̃]) is a village in the municipality of Sainte-Croix in the Swiss canton of Vaud in the Jura Mountains. It lies at the west end of the road over the Col de l'Aiguillon. It is known for its music-box museum, the Musée Baud.
