= Carlos Wiggen =

Norwegian novelist and historian of ideas

Carlos Wiggen (born 15 March 1950) is a Norwegian novelist and historian of ideas.

He was born in Fredrikstad. He first made his mark as a novelist; his books include Slagskipet Scharnhorst (1978), Nordsjøfakkelen (1979), Så fast en borg (1993) and Arkadia (1997), and draw upon the history of ideas.

Wiggen took the mag.art. degree in philosophy at the University of Oslo in 1975. In 1998 he took delivered the doctor's thesis Kants ultimatum at the University of Bergen. The next year he followed with Spørsmålet om den hellige gral. En motivhistorisk gjennomgang, earning the dr.philos. degree at the University of Oslo. In 2007 he published the book Filosofi og drama.
