= Ruppen Pass =

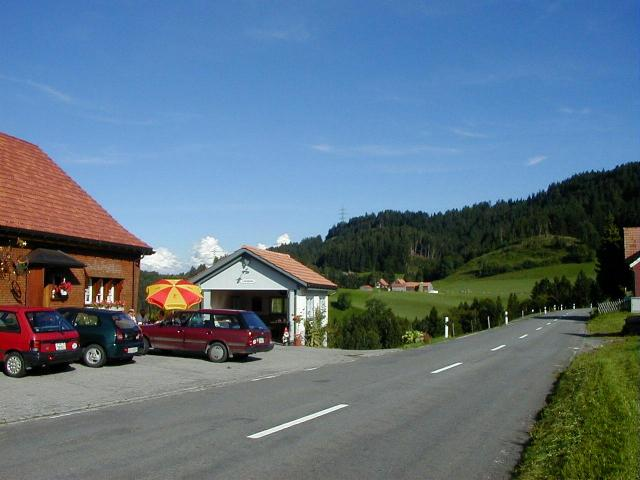
- Ruppen Pass

- Location within Alps
- Elevation: 1,003 metres (3,291 ft)
- Traversed by: Road

Third Approach
- Location: Switzerland
- Coordinates: 47°23′43.58″N 09°30′35.09″E

Ruppen Pass (elevation 1003 m) is a high mountain pass between the cantons of St. Gallen and Appenzell Ausserrhoden in Switzerland.

It connects Trogen and Altstätten. The pass road has a maximum grade of 9 percent.

== See also ==
- List of highest paved roads in Europe
- List of mountain passes
- List of the highest Swiss passes
