= Col des Planches =

Mountain pass in the Alps in Switzerland

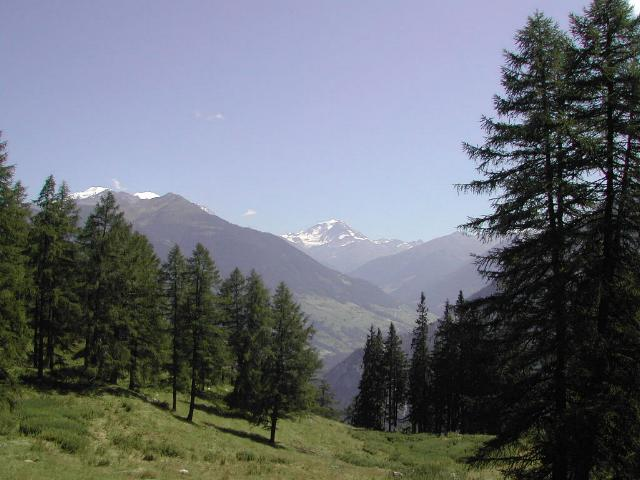
- Col des Planches
- Interactive map of Col des Planches
- Elevation: 1,411 metres (4,629 ft)
- Traversed by: Trail

Third Approach
- Location: Switzerland
- Range: Alps
- Coordinates: 46°5′47″N 7°7′29″E

Col des Planches (el. 1,411 metres (4,629 ft)) is a high mountain pass in the Alps in the canton of Valais in Switzerland. The road to the Col runs from Martigny at 471 metres (1,545 ft) with an average gradient of about 9%, over Col des Planches then down to Sembrancher at 717 metres (2,352 ft) with an average gradient of 7%.

== See also ==
- List of highest paved roads in Europe
- List of mountain passes
