= Alpe di Neggia =

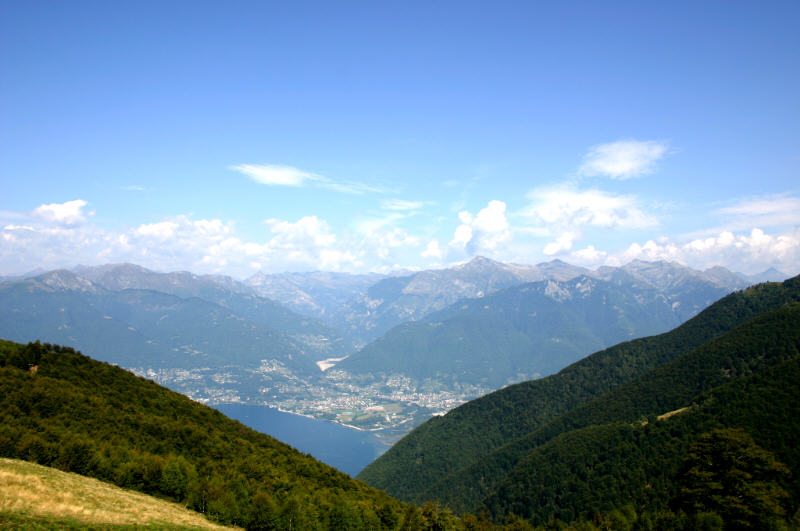
- Alpe di Neggia

- Location within Switzerland
- Elevation: 1,395 metres (4,577 ft)
- Traversed by: Road

Third Approach
- Location: Ticino, Switzerland
- Range: Alps
- Coordinates: 46°6′42″N 08°50′45″E

Alpe di Neggia (el. 1395 m.) is a high mountain pass in the Swiss Alps in the canton of Ticino in Switzerland.

It connects Vira and Indemini. The pass lies in the saddle between Monte Tamaro and Monte Gambarogno. The maximum grade of the pass road is 12 percent.

== See also ==
- List of highest paved roads in Europe
- List of mountain passes
