= Lists of mountain passes =

This is a list of lists of mountain passes.

- List of mountain passes
- List of mountain passes and hills in the Tour de France
- List of mountain passes in Alabama
- List of mountain passes in Albania
- List of mountain passes in California
- List of mountain passes in Colorado
- List of mountain passes in Florida
- List of mountain passes of Gauteng
- List of mountain passes in Georgia (U.S. state)
- List of mountain passes in Hawaii
- List of mountain passes of India
- List of mountain passes of KwaZulu-Natal
- List of mountain passes in Kyrgyzstan
- List of mountain passes of Limpopo
- List of mountain passes in Maine
- List of mountain passes in Montana
  - List of mountain passes in Montana (A–L)
  - List of mountain passes in Montana (M–Z)
- List of mountain passes of Mpumalanga
- List of mountain passes of Nepal
- List of mountain passes in New Hampshire
- List of mountain passes in North Carolina
- List of mountain passes of North West (province)
- List of mountain passes in Oregon
- List of mountain passes in Pakistan
- List of mountain passes of South Africa
- List of mountain passes in South Carolina
- List of mountain passes in Switzerland
- List of mountain passes of the Eastern Cape
- List of mountain passes of the Free State
- List of mountain passes of the Northern Cape
- List of mountain passes in the Northern Mariana Islands
- List of mountain passes of the Western Cape
- List of mountain passes of Wales
- List of mountain passes in Washington
- List of mountain passes in Wyoming
  - List of mountain passes in Wyoming (A–J)
  - List of mountain passes in Wyoming (K–Y)
