= List of mountain passes of KwaZulu-Natal =

This is a list of publicly accessible passes in the KwaZulu Natal, South Africa.

== List of passes in the KwaZulu-Natal province ==
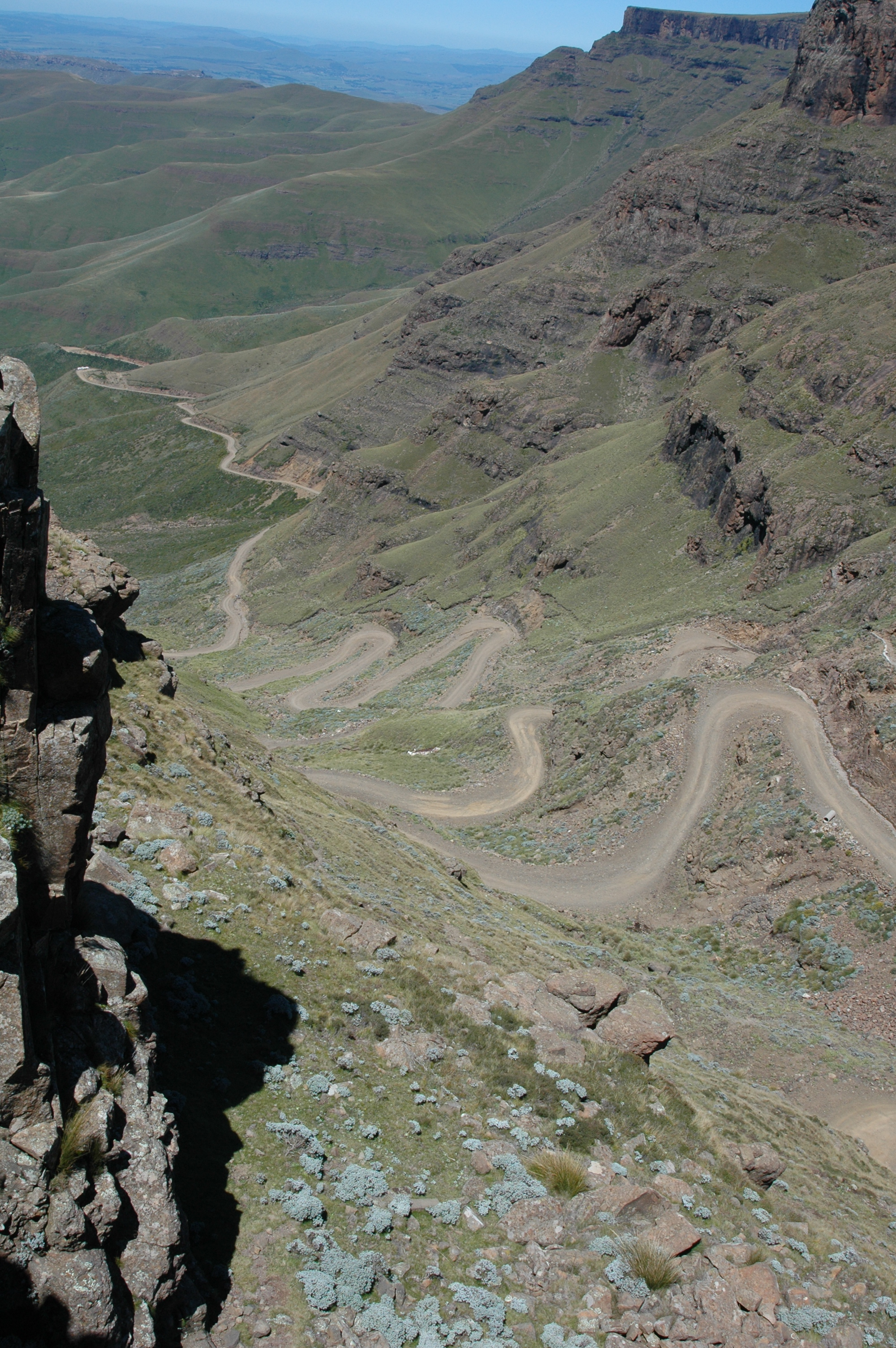
Sani Pass

Name	Location	Crosses	Highest Point (m)	Road	Between towns	Road surface
Ape's Pass	29°8′S 29°21′E		2900		near Kwadlamini	Footpath
Bannerman's Pass	29°15′15″S 29°25′17″E	Drakensberg	3100		near Giant's Castle	Footpath
Bezuidenhouts Pass	28.5485°S 29.2138°E		1751		Harrismith and Bergville	Gravel
Botha's Pass	27°37′S 29°43′E		1809	R34	Memel and Newcastle	Tar (Potholed)
Brandon's Pass	28°9′33″S 29°39′47″E	Drakensberg	1792		East of Harrismith	Gravel
Burger's Pass	27.6024°S 30.3810°E		1519		Near Utrecht, KwaZulu-Natal	Gravel
Bushman's Nek Pass	29.8735°S 29.1611°E	Drakensberg	2435		In the Sehlabathebe National Park (vehicles prohibited)	Footpath
Cecil Macks Pass	27.0735°S 32.0010°E		610		near Ingwavuma, Swaziland border	Gravel
Colling's Pass	28.2171°S 29.6395°E		1773		East of Harrismith, North of Ladysmith, KwaZulu-Natal	Gravel
De Beer's Pass	28.3174°S 29.4993°E		1720	S61	Harrismith and Ladysmith, KwaZulu-Natal	Tar
Endoumeni Pass	28.2299°S 30.1955°E		1375		Dundee and Wasbank	Tar
Giant's Castle Pass	29°20′26″S 29°28′4″E	Drakensberg	3314		Near Giant's Castle	Footpath
Goodoo Pass	28°41′14″S 28°54′32″E	Drakensberg	2189		On the old road to Witsieshoek	Gravel
Gray's Pass	29°4′18″S 29°19′25″E	Drakensberg	3180		Near Champagne Castle	Footpath
Griffin's Hill	29.0932°S 29.9663°E		1590	R103	Mooi River and Estcourt	Tar
Hela Hela Pass (Helehele Pass)	29.9096°S 30.0772°E		1199	D114	Richmond and Donnybrook	Gravel
Ikhupe Pass (Mkupe Pass)	28.1541°S 29.9687°E		1469	N11	Ladysmith and Newcastle	Tar
Jareteng Pass	29°18′16″S 29°26′41″E					
Knight's Pass	27.6564°S 30.3725°E		1662		Near Utrecht	Gravel
Laing's Nek Pass	27.4814°S 29.8724°E		1692	N11	Volksrust and Newcastle	Tar
Middledale Pass (Tintwa Pass)	28.4804°S 29.3233°E	Drakensberg	1629	S1101	Geluksburg and Swinburne, Free State	Tar
Mike's Pass	28.9609°S 29.2317°E	Drakensberg	1931			Gravel
Muller's Pass	27.8667°S 29.7103°E	Drakensberg	1835		Newcastle, KwaZulu-Natal and Memel, Free State	Gravel
Nicholson's Nek Pass	28.4743°S 29.7627°E		1175		Ladysmith, KwaZulu-Natal and Burford, KwaZulu-Natal	Gravel
Normandien Pass	27.9759°S 29.7005°E	Drakensberg	1992		Farming areas around Newcastle, KwaZulu-Natal and Memel, Free State	Gravel
Oliviershoek Pass	28.5693°S 29.0717°E	Drakensberg	1742	R74	Harrismith and Bergville	Tar (Potholed)
Ping Pong Cuttings	29.5237°S 29.5957°E	Drakensberg	1325			Gravel
Sabana Pass	27.1622°S 31.9780°E		614			Gravel
Sandspruit Pass	28.4706°S 29.3715°E		1646			Gravel
Sani Pass	29.5882°S 29.2927°E	Drakensberg	2876			Gravel
Soutar's Hill	29.4200°S 29.8116°E		1741		Nottingham Road and Nzinga River Valley	Tar
The Devil's Pass	27.7128°S 30.9323°E	Mhlobane Mountain	1562			Gravel
Van Reenen's Pass	28.4069°S 29.3971°E	Drakensberg	1768	N3	Ladysmith, KwaZulu-Natal and Harrismith	Tar

== See also ==
- List of mountain passes of South Africa
