= List of mountain passes of Limpopo =

This is a list of publicly accessible, motorable passes in the Limpopo Province, South Africa.
See Mountain Passes of South Africa

Name	Location	Crosses	Highest Point (m)	Road	Between towns	Road surface
Abel Erasmus Pass	24.4469°S 30.6119°E			R36	Ohrigstad and Tzaneen	
Chuniespoort	24.2505°S 29.5387°E			R37	Polokwane and Lebowakgomo	
Jack's Pass	22.3230°S 30.9303°E					
Magoebaskloof	23.8638°S 30.0068°E			R71	Haenertsburg and Tzaneen	
Masekwaspoort	22.8841°S 29.8744°E			N1	Louis Trichardt and Musina	
Orris Baragwanath Pass	24.1097°S 30.1426°E			R37 (partially)	Lebowakgomo and Ofcolaco	
Rankin's Pass	24.5044°S 27.8635°E					
Van Collers Pass	22.9190°S 29.6095°E					
Wyllie's Poort	22.9236°S 29.9326°E			N1	Louis Trichardt and Musina	
