= Bezuidenhout (disambiguation) =

Bezuidenhout may refer to:

== Places ==
- Bezuidenhout, neighborhood of The Hague, the Netherlands
  - Bombing of the Bezuidenhout, World War II bombing of the neighborhood by the Royal Air Force
- Bezuidenhouts Pass, mountain pass in KwaZulu-Natal province, South Africa
- Bezuidenhout Valley, suburb of Johannesburg, South Africa

== People ==
- Alicia Bezuidenhout (b. 1967), South African cricketer
- Bernadine Bezuidenhout (b. 1993), South African cricketer
- Carl Bezuidenhout (b. 1986), South African rugby union player
- Christiaan Bezuidenhout (b. 1994), South African golfer
- Christo Bezuidenhout (b. 1970), South African rugby union player
- Cornelis Frederik Bezuidenhout (1773–1815), Cape Colony rebel whose death led to the Slachter's Nek Rebellion
- Dawid Bezuidenhout (1935–1998), South West African politician
- Ertjies Bezuidenhout (1955–2012), South African cyclist
- Heino Bezuidenhout (b. 1997), South African rugby union player
- Kristian Bezuidenhout (b. 1979), Australian pianist
- Ryan Bezuidenhout (b. 1986), Zimbabwean cricketer
- Simon Bezuidenhout (1946–2023), South African cricketer
- Steve Bezuidenhout (b. 1957), Namibian politician

== Fictional characters ==
- Evita Bezuidenhout, fictional character played by Pieter-Dirk Uys
