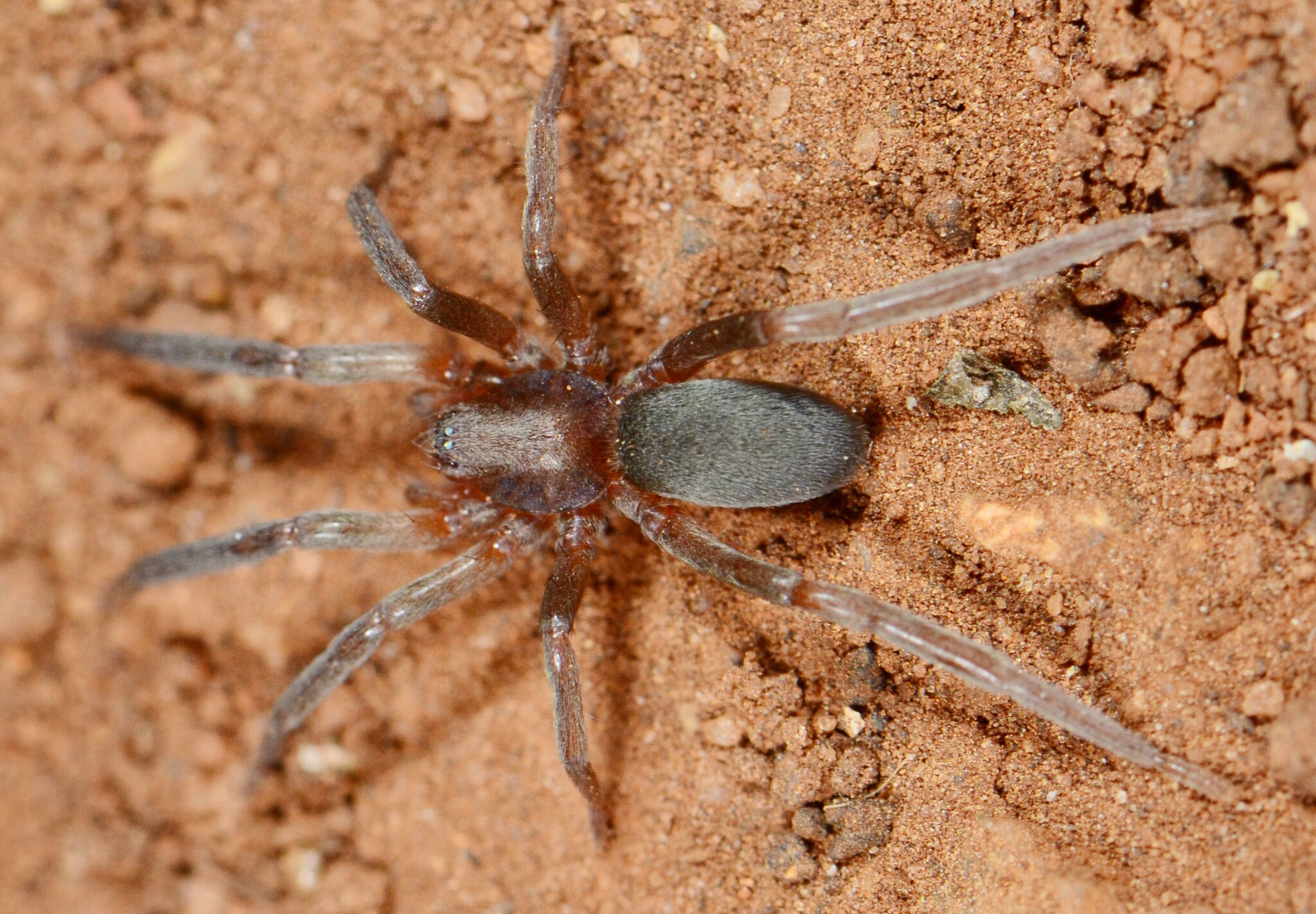
- female
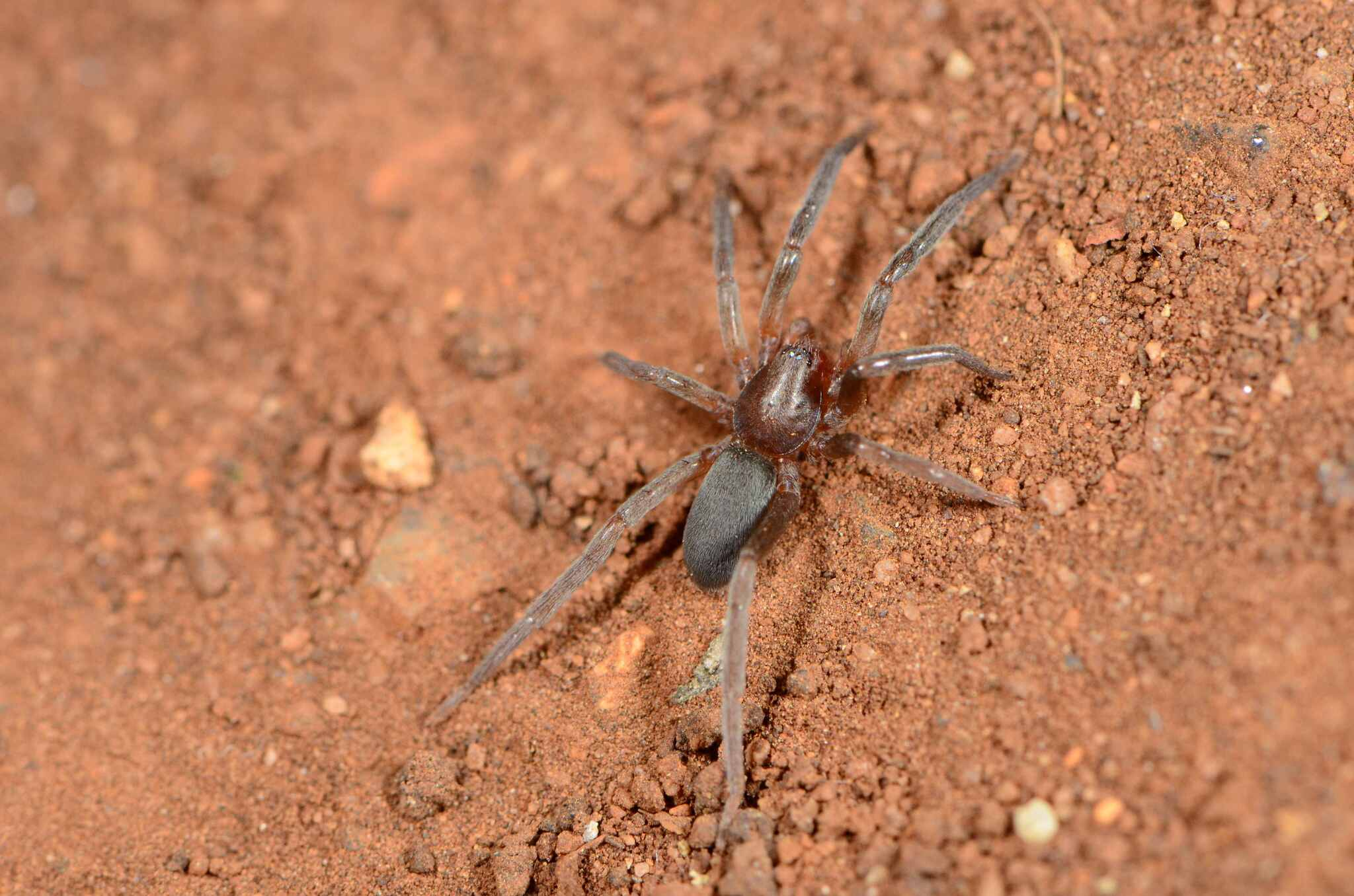
- female

Scientific classification
- Kingdom: Animalia
- Phylum: Arthropoda
- Subphylum: Chelicerata
- Class: Arachnida
- Order: Araneae
- Infraorder: Araneomorphae
- Family: Gnaphosidae
- Genus: Scotophaeus
- Species: S. natalensis

Binomial name
- Scotophaeus natalensis Lawrence, 1938

= Scotophaeus natalensis =

Natal Golden Ground Spider

Species of spider

Scotophaeus natalensis is a species of spider in the family Gnaphosidae. It is found in southern Africa and is commonly known as Natal golden ground spider.

== Distribution ==
Scotophaeus natalensis is found in Zimbabwe and South Africa. In South Africa, it is recorded from two provinces: Free State and KwaZulu-Natal. Notable locations include Wyndford Guest Farm, Umhlali, Sani Pass, and Vernon Crookes Nature Reserve.

== Habitat and ecology ==
The species is a free-living ground dweller found at altitudes ranging from 43 to 1,989 m above sea level. It has been sampled from the Savanna biome.

== Conservation ==
Scotophaeus natalensis is listed as Least Concern by the South African National Biodiversity Institute due to its wide geographical range. The species is protected in the Vernon Crookes Nature Reserve.

== Etymology ==
The species name natalensis refers to the former Natal region (now KwaZulu-Natal) where it was originally discovered.

== Taxonomy ==
The species was originally described by Reginald Frederick Lawrence in 1938 from Umhlali, KwaZulu-Natal. It is currently known only from female specimens.
