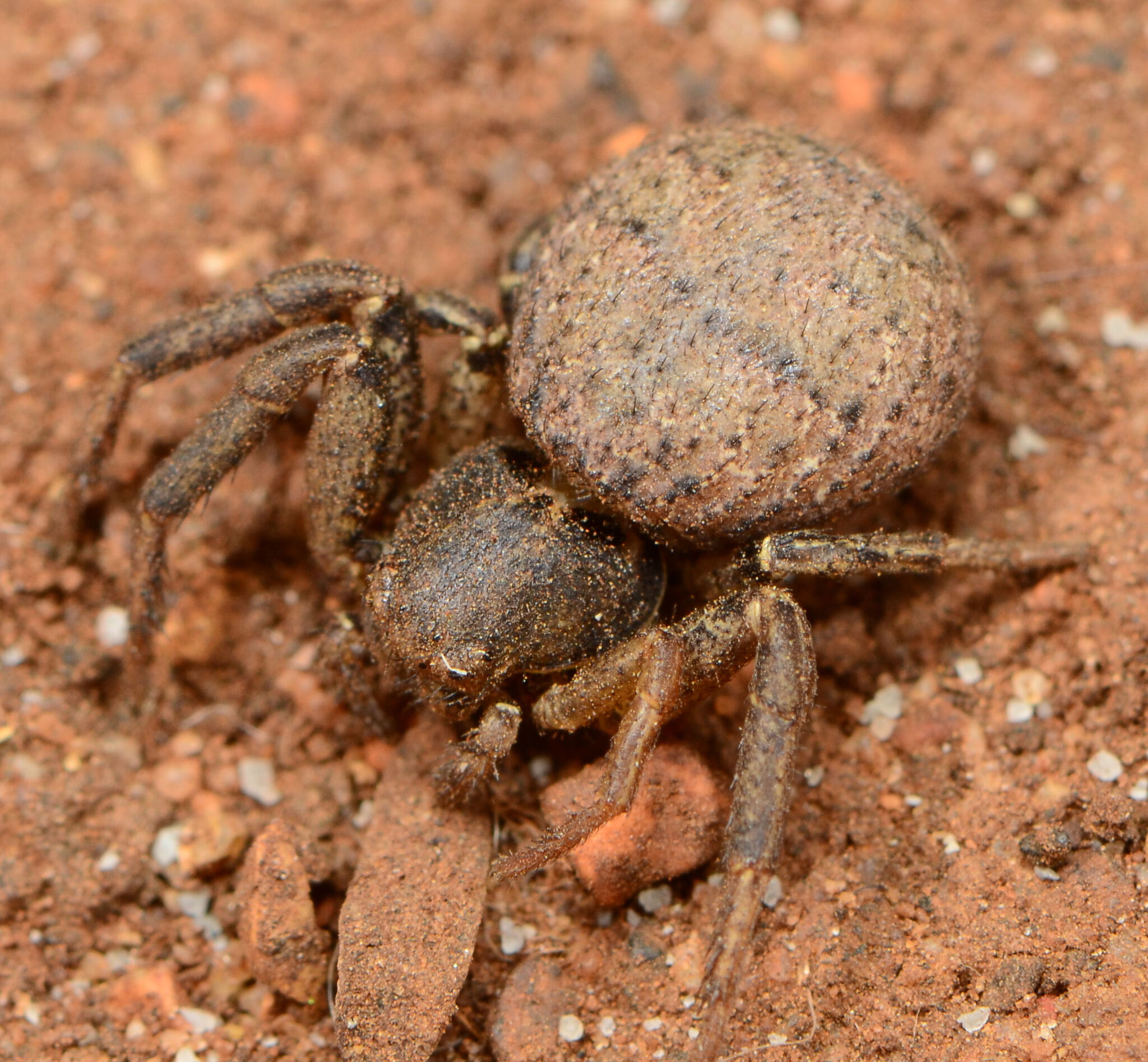
- Female
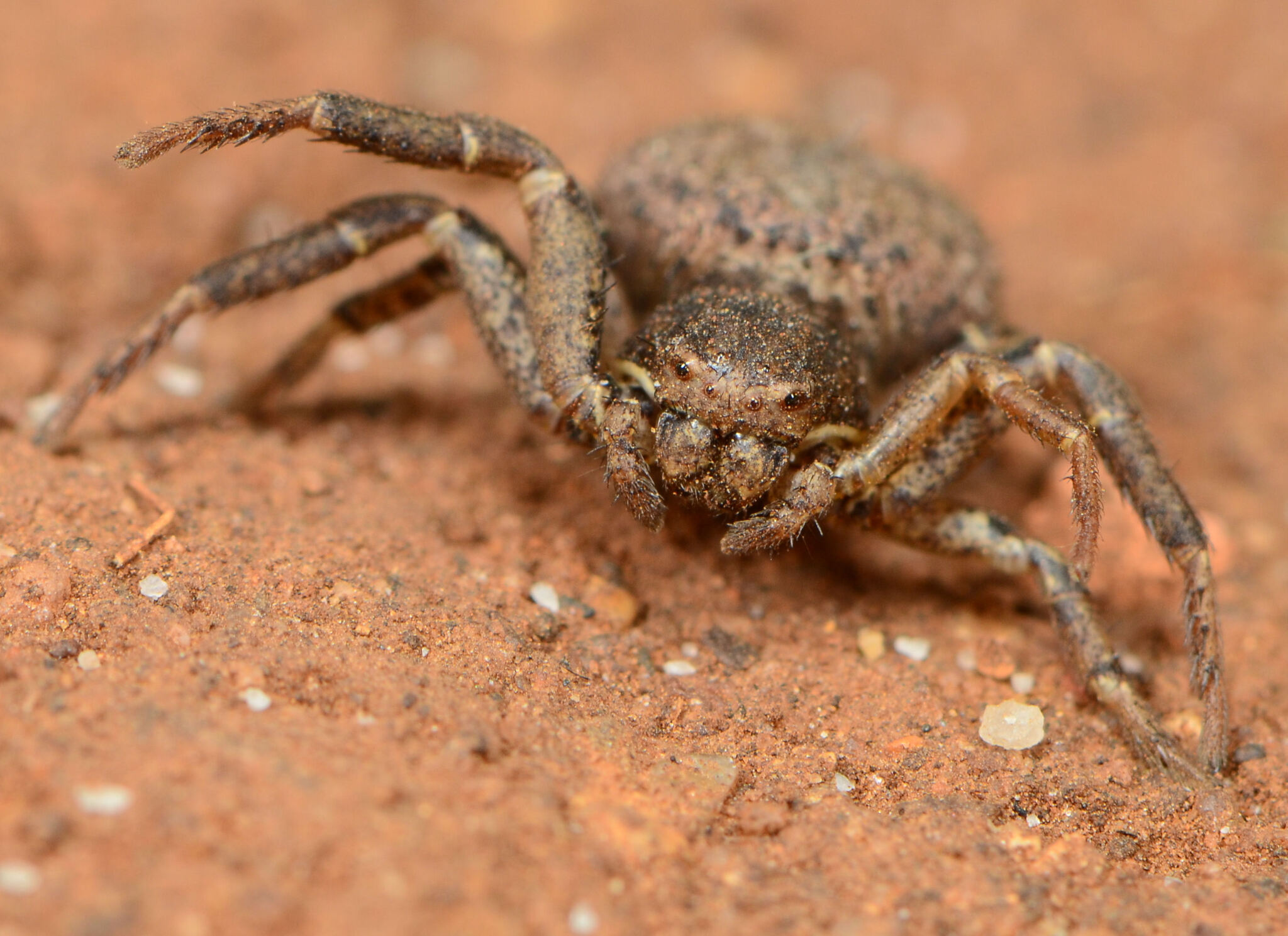
- Female

Scientific classification
- Kingdom: Animalia
- Phylum: Arthropoda
- Subphylum: Chelicerata
- Class: Arachnida
- Order: Araneae
- Infraorder: Araneomorphae
- Family: Thomisidae
- Genus: Xysticus
- Species: X. urbensis

Binomial name
- Xysticus urbensis Lawrence, 1952

= Xysticus urbensis =

Urbensis Xysticus Ground Crab Spider

Species of spider

Xysticus urbensis is a species of spider in the family Thomisidae. It occurs in Lesotho and South Africa and is commonly known as the urbensis xysticus ground crab spider.

== Distribution ==
Xysticus urbensis occurs in two southern African countries: Lesotho and South Africa. In South Africa, the species is distributed across seven provinces: Eastern Cape, Gauteng, KwaZulu-Natal, Limpopo, Mpumalanga, North West, and Western Cape. The species occurs at altitudes ranging from 39 to 2,985 m above sea level.

Notable South African locations include Wilgerskloof Farm, Suikerbosrand Nature Reserve, Irene, Kliprivierberg Nature Reserve, Roodepoort, Pietermaritzburg, Ndumo Game Reserve, Ophathe Game Reserve, Natal Good Hope Plantation, Sani Pass, Newcastle district, Luvhondo Nature Reserve, Delmas, Hartbeespoortdam, Cape of Good Hope Nature Reserve, and Cape Peninsula.

== Habitat and ecology ==
Xysticus urbensis is found under stones during the day. The species inhabits forest, fynbos, grassland, and savanna biomes. It has also been found in maize fields.

== Conservation ==
Xysticus urbensis is listed as Least Concern by the South African National Biodiversity Institute due to its wide geographical range. The species is protected in several areas including Ndumo Game Reserve, Ophathe Game Reserve, Suikerbosrand Nature Reserve, and Kliprivierberg Nature Reserve. No conservation actions are recommended.

== Description ==
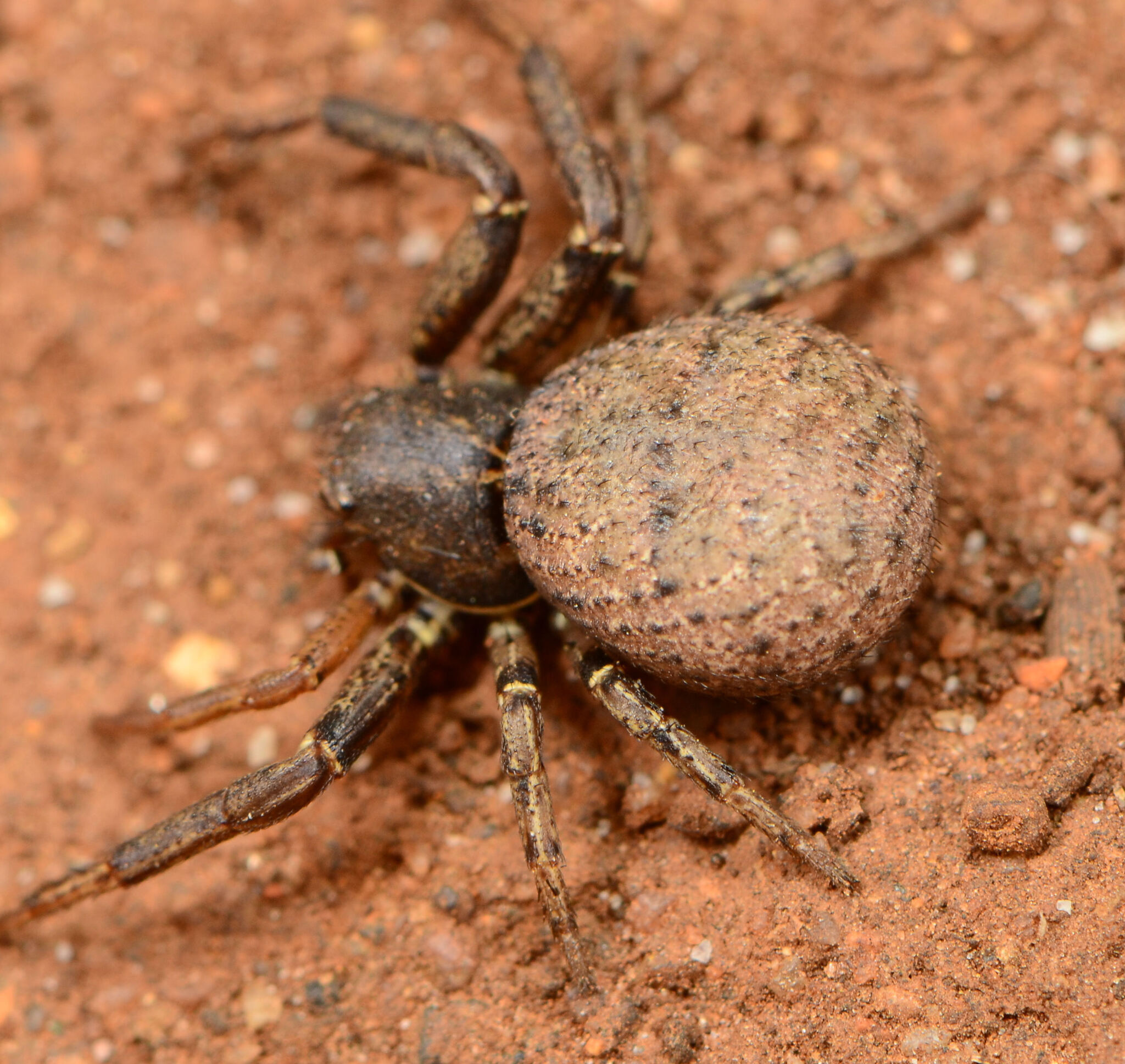
Female

== Taxonomy ==
The species was originally described by Reginald Frederick Lawrence in 1952 from Pietermaritzburg in KwaZulu-Natal. African species of Xysticus have not been revised, and the species is known from both sexes.
