= Bushman's Nek Pass =

- Location within KwaZulu-Natal Location within South Africa
- Elevation: 2,435 metres (7,989 ft)

Third Approach
- Location: Border of KwaZulu Natal, South Africa and Lesotho
- Range: Drakensberg Mountains
- Coordinates: 29°52′24.6″S 29°09′40″E

Bushman's Nek Pass is situated in the KwaZulu-Natal province of South Africa on a path to the Sehlabathebe National Park.

== Route ==
The pass starts at the South Africa/Lesotho Border Post which lies at an elevation of 1764m and climbs to 2435m at its summit. The route is suitable only for hiking and horse riding. Motor vehicles and motor cycles are not allowed onto the pass.

== See also ==
- Mountain passes of South Africa
- KwaZulu Natal Passes
