= Diaphractus =

Scientific classification
- Kingdom: Animalia
- Phylum: Arthropoda
- Subphylum: Chelicerata
- Class: Arachnida
- Order: Araneae
- Infraorder: Araneomorphae
- Family: Gnaphosidae
- Genus: Diaphractus; Purcell, 1907

Type species
- D. leipoldti Purcell, 1907

Species
- D. assimilis Tullgren, 1910; D. leipoldti Purcell, 1907; D. muticus Lawrence, 1927

Genus of spiders

Diaphractus is a genus of African ground spiders that was first described by William Frederick Purcell in 1907. As of September 2025, it contains three species.

The genus is closely allied to Scotophaeus but resembles a Clubiona in appearance.

== Description ==
In the genus Diaphractus, the carapace is long-oval, depressed, and broad in front, with thoracic stria. The anterior row of eyes is almost straight, with the eyes slightly separated from one another and the medians largest. The posterior row of eyes is wider and slightly procurved, with the medians sub rotund and small. Lateral eyes on each side are slightly nearer together than the anterior and posterior median eyes.

The chelicerae are strong and somewhat attenuated at apex, with the oblique superior margin bearing three small teeth remote from one another, while no inferior teeth are present. The labium is elongate, narrow, and parallel-sided, only slightly attenuated and emarginated at apex, reaching almost up to the inner angles of the maxillae. The lateral margins are narrowly keeled, and the surface is depressed between the keels. The maxillae are broad and strongly depressed, slightly dilated externally at apex and emarginated behind the dilation, with the base attenuated. The inner margin is straight, and the outer margin is strongly convex in the posterior two-thirds. The posterior three-fourths of the maxilla is bordered along inner, posterior, and outer margins by a strong continuous keel.

The sternum is oval, strongly attenuated in front and produced. The legs are robust and short, with the posterior pairs numerously spined and the anterior pairs more sparsely spined.

== Species ==
- Diaphractus assimilis Tullgren, 1910 – East Africa
- Diaphractus leipoldti Purcell, 1907 – South Africa (type species)
- Diaphractus muticus Lawrence, 1927 – Namibia
