= Scotophaeus marleyi =

Marleyi's Golden Ground Spider

Conservation status
- Least Concern (SANBI Red List)

Scientific classification
- Kingdom: Animalia
- Phylum: Arthropoda
- Subphylum: Chelicerata
- Class: Arachnida
- Order: Araneae
- Infraorder: Araneomorphae
- Family: Gnaphosidae
- Genus: Scotophaeus
- Species: S. marleyi

Binomial name
- Scotophaeus marleyi Tucker, 1923

Species of spider

Scotophaeus marleyi is a species of spider in the family Gnaphosidae. It is endemic to South Africa and is commonly known as Marleyi's golden ground spider.

== Distribution ==
Scotophaeus marleyi is found in four South African provinces: Free State, KwaZulu-Natal, Limpopo, and North West. Notable locations include the National Botanical Gardens in Bloemfontein, Durban, Ithala Nature Reserve, Sani Pass, Kruger National Park, Polokwane Nature Reserve, and Blouberg Nature Reserve.

== Habitat and ecology ==
The species is a free-living ground dweller found at altitudes ranging from 17 to 1,530 m above sea level. It has been sampled from Grassland and Savanna biomes.

== Conservation ==
Scotophaeus marleyi is listed as Least Concern by the South African National Biodiversity Institute despite identification of males being problematic, due to its wide distribution range. The species is protected in five protected areas including the National Botanical Gardens in Bloemfontein, Ithala Nature Reserve, Kruger National Park, Polokwane Nature Reserve, and Blouberg Nature Reserve.

== Taxonomy ==
The species was originally described by Tucker in 1923 from Durban. It is currently known only from the female.
