= List of mountain passes of the Free State =

This is a list of publicly accessible, motorable passes in the Free State Province, South Africa.

Name	Location	Crosses	Highest Point (m)	Road	Between towns	Road surface
Bell's Pass	28.5504°S 26.9641°E			R73 (Free State)		
Botha's Pass	27.6316°S 29.7198°E					
Brandon's Pass	28.1552°S 29.6650°E					
Lichen's Pass	28.5324°S 28.6662°E					
Noupoortsnek	28.4979°S 28.4213°E					

== See also ==
- Mountain Passes of South Africa
