= List of mountain passes of the Northern Cape =

This is a list of publicly accessible, motorable passes in the Northern Cape province, South Africa.
See Mountain Passes of South Africa

Name	Location	Crosses	Highest Point (m)	Road	Between towns	Road surface
Amandelnek	32.6258°S 20.3511°E					
Anenous Pass	29.2259°S 17.6074°E					
Bailey's Pass (Pypmaker se Poort)	30.1634°S 18.1972°E					
Bastersnek	30.6360°S 25.0349°E					
Bergenaarspad Pass	28.4898°S 22.6012°E					
Bloukrans Pass (Onder-Bokkeveld)	31.6694°S 19.7496°E					
Blounek	30.9941°S 22.0407°E					
Bloupoort	32.4000°S 20.9333°E					
Botterkloof Pass	31.8273°S 19.2663°E					
Burke's Pass - RSA	29.8820°S 17.8791°E					
Charles' Pass	29.0063°S 19.1854°E					
Gannaga Pass	32.1285°S 20.1142°E					
Kareebospoort	30.9059°S 22.2588°E					
Keikamaspoort	29.8120°S 22.8733°E					
Keiskie se Poort	31.5904°S 19.8585°E					
Komsberg Pass	32.6795°S 20.7580°E					
Langkloof Pass (1)	27.9031°S 22.6388°E					
Langkloof Pass (2)	30.4845°S 18.1370°E					
Mekataanspoort	30.6161°S 22.2356°E					
Messelpad Pass	29.9066°S 17.6565°E					
Moordenaarspoort	31.3262°S 19.9357°E					
Ottaspoort	30.7356°S 18.2446°E					
Ouberg Pass	32.4092°S 20.3537°E					
Oukloof Pass	32.1799°S 21.7840°E					
Oupoort Pass (1)	32.1673°S 20.3789°E					
Oupoort Pass (2)	32.2107°S 20.4158°E					
Prieskapoort	29.7436°S 22.6993°E					
Pypmaker se Poort	30.1634°S 18.1972°E					
Quaggasfontein Poort	31.5871°S 20.8455°E					
Renosterpoort	30.7349°S 22.3366°E					
Rooikloof Pass	32.5004°S 20.6401°E					
Rooipoort	32.3746°S 20.9345°E					
Snyders Poort	31.9953°S 20.6881°E					
Studer's Pass	30.4004°S 18.0650°E					
Teekloof Pass	32.2013°S 21.6207°E					
Vanrhyns Pass	31.3836°S 19.0227°E					
Verlatekloof Pass	32.5436°S 20.6133°E					
Volstruispoort	30.6445°S 22.7139°E					
Wildeperdehoek Pass	29.9415°S 17.6219°E					
Windpoort	29.2638°S 17.4184°E					
