= List of mountain passes in South Carolina =

The following is a list of mountain passes and gaps in the U.S. state of South Carolina.

Name	Mountain range	County	Elevation	Coordinates	Primary access route	Other access route(s)	GNIS
Bailey Gap	Saluda Mountains	Greenville	2,930 feet (890 m)	35°09′47″N 82°31′00″W			980432
Beasley Gap	Blue Ridge Mountains	Pickens	1,886 feet (575 m)	35°00′54″N 82°47′39″W	US 178		1220419
Callas Gap	Blue Ridge Mountains	Oconee	1,949 feet (594 m)	34°53′26″N 83°10′25″W	SC 28		1221206
Chimneytop Gap	Blue Ridge Mountains	Pickens	2,408 feet (734 m)	35°03′43″N 82°47′53″W	F. Van Clayton Highway		1221569
Cove Gap	Blue Ridge Mountains	Pickens	1,322 feet (403 m)	34°58′41″N 82°49′54″W			1221781
Emory Gap	Blue Ridge Mountains	Pickens	2,762 feet (842 m)	35°02′38″N 82°45′13″W			1222288
Grunting Spring Gap	Blue Ridge Mountains	Greenville	2,956 feet (901 m)	35°05′17″N 82°43′46″W			986183
Gum Gap	Blue Ridge Mountains	Greenville	3,061 feet (933 m)	35°06′08″N 82°41′30″W			986217
Hi Saw Gap	Blue Ridge Mountains	Oconee	1,427 feet (435 m)	34°47′49″N 83°07′24″W	SC 28		1229793
Hickory Gap	Blue Ridge Mountains	Oconee	1,982 feet (604 m)	35°01′00″N 82°57′13″W			1223132
High Low Gap	Blue Ridge Mountains	Pickens	1,522 feet (464 m)	35°03′06″N 82°41′03″W			1223169
Horse Gap	Blue Ridge Mountains	Pickens	2,342 feet (714 m)	35°00′55″N 82°47′10″W			1223314
Horse Gap	Blue Ridge Mountains	Pickens	1,460 feet (450 m)	34°59′03″N 82°49′19″W			1223313
Jones Gap	Blue Ridge Mountains	Greenville	2,907 feet (886 m)	35°07′46″N 82°38′20″W	US 276		1012558
Laurel Fork Gap	Blue Ridge Mountains	Pickens	2,087 feet (636 m)	35°02′36″N 82°50′19″W	Horse Pasture Road		1223828
Lays Gap	Blue Ridge Mountains	Pickens	1,463 feet (446 m)	34°59′39″N 82°48′45″W			1223851
Line Rock Gap	Blue Ridge Mountains	Oconee	1,949 feet (594 m)	35°02′09″N 82°58′33″W			1012878
Lower Gap	Blue Ridge Mountains	Greenville	1,883 feet (574 m)	35°05′55″N 82°23′00″W			1224210
Mongold Gap	Blue Ridge Mountains	Oconee	1,863 feet (568 m)	34°52′13″N 83°11′19″W			1230032
Mosley Gap	Blue Ridge Mountains	Pickens	1,201 feet (366 m)	34°58′55″N 82°45′18″W	US 178		1224667
Panther Gap	Saluda Mountains	Greenville	2,385 feet (727 m)	35°09′56″N 82°26′59″W			991835
Panther Gap	Blue Ridge Mountains	Pickens	2,529 feet (771 m)	35°02′36″N 82°43′04″W			1225287
Reed Mountain Gap	Blue Ridge Mountains	Oconee	2,142 feet (653 m)	34°52′09″N 83°12′23″W			1225800
Rocky Gap	Blue Ridge Mountains	Oconee	1,860 feet (570 m)	34°52′09″N 83°12′23″W			1225981
Sassafras Gap	Blue Ridge Mountains	Greenville–Pickens	2,864 feet (873 m)	35°04′05″N 82°45′53″W			1015272
Slicking Gap	Blue Ridge Mountains	Greenville	2,871 feet (875 m)	35°05′54″N 82°42′16″W			994915
The Narrow Passage	King Sand Hills	Chesterfield	364 feet (111 m)	34°39′17″N 80°10′34″W	SC 109		1227081
Trammel Gap	Saluda Mountains	Greenville	2,198 feet (670 m)	35°10′50″N 82°22′13″W			996202
Upper Gap	Blue Ridge Mountains	Greenville	2,054 feet (626 m)	35°05′46″N 82°35′39″W			1227320
Vaughns Gap	Blue Ridge Mountains	Greenville	2,592 feet (790 m)	35°10′39″N 82°17′37″W			1227337
