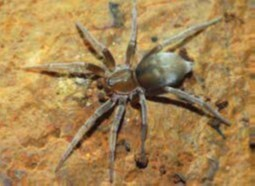
- female

Scientific classification
- Kingdom: Animalia
- Phylum: Arthropoda
- Subphylum: Chelicerata
- Class: Arachnida
- Order: Araneae
- Infraorder: Araneomorphae
- Family: Gnaphosidae
- Genus: Scotophaeus
- Species: S. purcelli

Binomial name
- Scotophaeus purcelli Tucker, 1923

= Scotophaeus purcelli =

Purcell Golden Ground Spider

Species of spider

Scotophaeus purcelli is a species of spider in the family Gnaphosidae. It is endemic to South Africa and is commonly known as Purcell golden ground spider.

== Distribution ==
Scotophaeus purcelli is found in two South African provinces: Gauteng and KwaZulu-Natal. Notable locations include Modderfontein, Rietondale Research Station in Pretoria, Empangeni, Ndumo Game Reserve, Pongola Farm Vergeval, and Pinetown.

== Habitat and ecology ==
The species is a free-living ground dweller found at altitudes ranging from 47 to 1,628 m above sea level. It has been sampled from Grassland and Savanna biomes.

== Conservation ==
Scotophaeus purcelli is listed as Least Concern by the South African National Biodiversity Institute due to its wide geographical range despite being known only from one sex. The species is protected in the Ndumo Game Reserve.

== Etymology ==
The species is named after William Frederick Purcell, a prominent South African arachnologist who made significant contributions to the study of southern African spiders.

== Taxonomy ==
The species was originally described by Tucker in 1923 from Modderfontein in Gauteng. It is currently known only from female specimens.
