= Jack's Pass =

Coordinates: 22°19′22.69″S 30°55′49.19″E

Jack's Pass is a private military zone situated in the Limpopo Province at South Africa's Matshakatini Nature Reserve.
