= Diaphractus leipoldti =

Scientific classification
- Kingdom: Animalia
- Phylum: Arthropoda
- Subphylum: Chelicerata
- Class: Arachnida
- Order: Araneae
- Infraorder: Araneomorphae
- Family: Gnaphosidae
- Genus: Diaphractus
- Species: D. leipoldti

Binomial name
- Diaphractus leipoldti Purcell, 1907

Synonyms
- Diaphractus kalaharicus Hewitt, 1915

Species of spider

Diaphractus leipoldti is a species of spider in the family Gnaphosidae. It is endemic to South Africa and is commonly known as Leipoldt's flat bellied ground spider.

== Distribution ==
Diaphractus leipoldti has been recorded from three South African provinces, Free State, Northern Cape, and Western Cape. The species was originally described from Rondegat, Clanwilliam, in the Western Cape.

== Habitat and ecology ==
The species inhabits Grassland and Fynbos biomes at altitudes ranging from 78 to 1,225 m above sea level. Diaphractus leipoldti is a free-living ground dweller.

== Conservation ==
Diaphractus leipoldti is listed as Data Deficient for taxonomic reasons by the South African National Biodiversity Institute. Although the species has a wide geographical range, it is presently known only from one sex. The species is protected in the Kalkfontein Dam Nature Reserve. More sampling is needed to collect males and determine the full extent of the species' range.

== Taxonomy ==
The species was originally described by W. F. Purcell in 1907 from Rondegat, Clanwilliam in the Western Cape. The genus Diaphractus has not been revised but was included in the monograph of Tucker (1923) and Murphy (2007).
