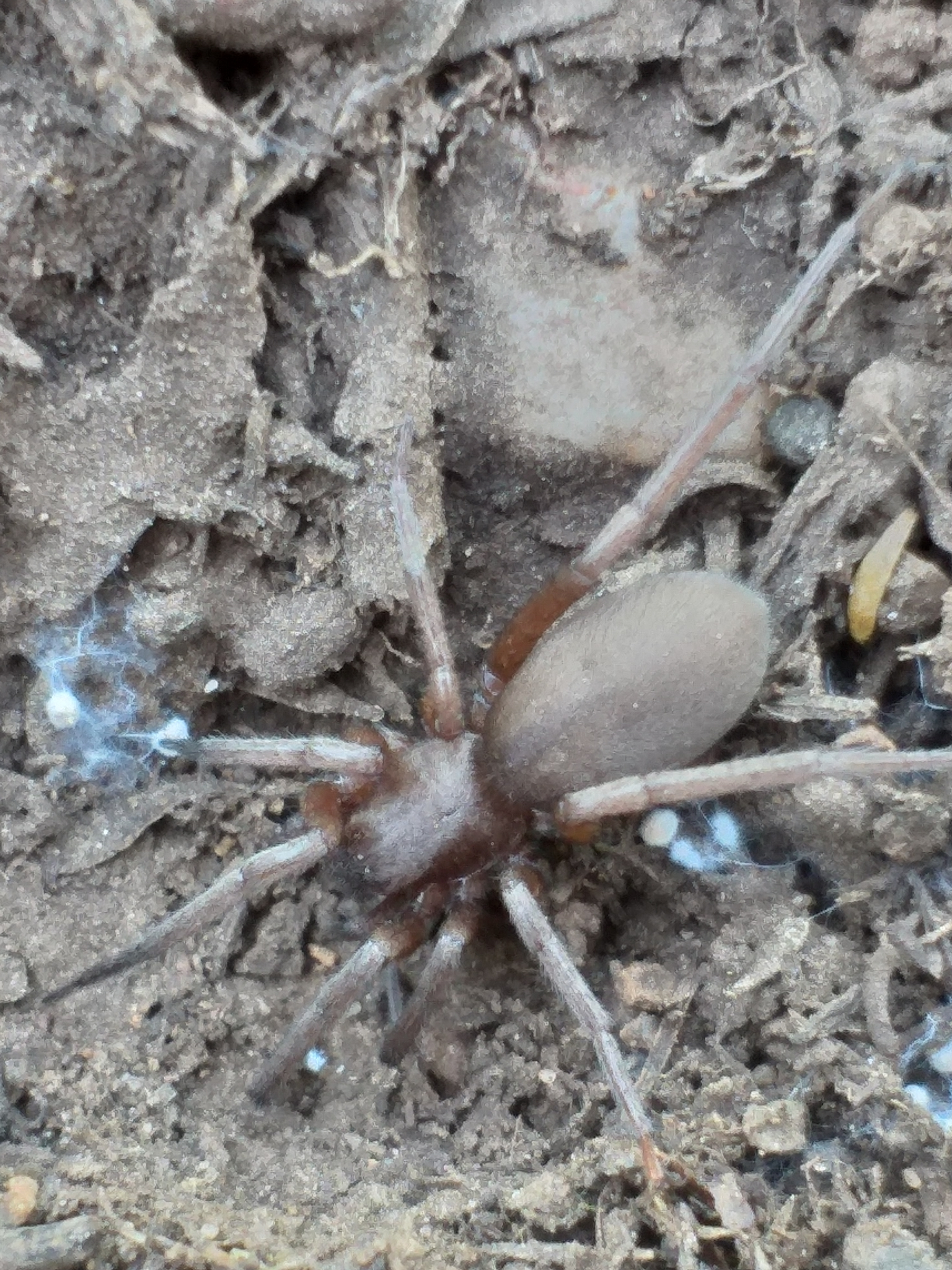
- Scotophaeus relegatus - kevin koen - 175503456.jpeg

Scientific classification
- Kingdom: Animalia
- Phylum: Arthropoda
- Subphylum: Chelicerata
- Class: Arachnida
- Order: Araneae
- Infraorder: Araneomorphae
- Family: Gnaphosidae
- Genus: Scotophaeus
- Species: S. relegatus

Binomial name
- Scotophaeus relegatus Purcell, 1907

= Scotophaeus relegatus =

Cape Golden Ground Spider

Species of spider

Scotophaeus relegatus is a species of spider in the family Gnaphosidae. It is found in southern Africa and is commonly known as Cape golden ground spider.

== Distribution ==
Scotophaeus relegatus is found in Namibia and South Africa. In South Africa, it is recorded from three provinces: Free State, Gauteng, and Western Cape. Notable locations include the National Botanical Gardens in Bloemfontein, Golden Gate National Park, Cape Town, Karoo National Park, Cederberg Wilderness Area, Stellenbosch, and Bontebok National Park.

== Habitat and ecology ==
The species is a free-living ground dweller found at altitudes ranging from 3 to 1,663 m above sea level. It has been sampled from Fynbos, Grassland, Nama Karoo, Succulent Karoo, and Savanna biomes, as well as from cotton fields and vineyards.

== Conservation ==
Scotophaeus relegatus is listed as Least Concern by the South African National Biodiversity Institute due to its wide range. The species is protected in more than ten protected areas and faces no significant threats.

== Etymology ==
The species name relegatus means "banished" or "sent away" in Latin.

== Taxonomy ==
The species was originally described by William Frederick Purcell in 1907 from Cape Town. It is currently known only from male specimens.
