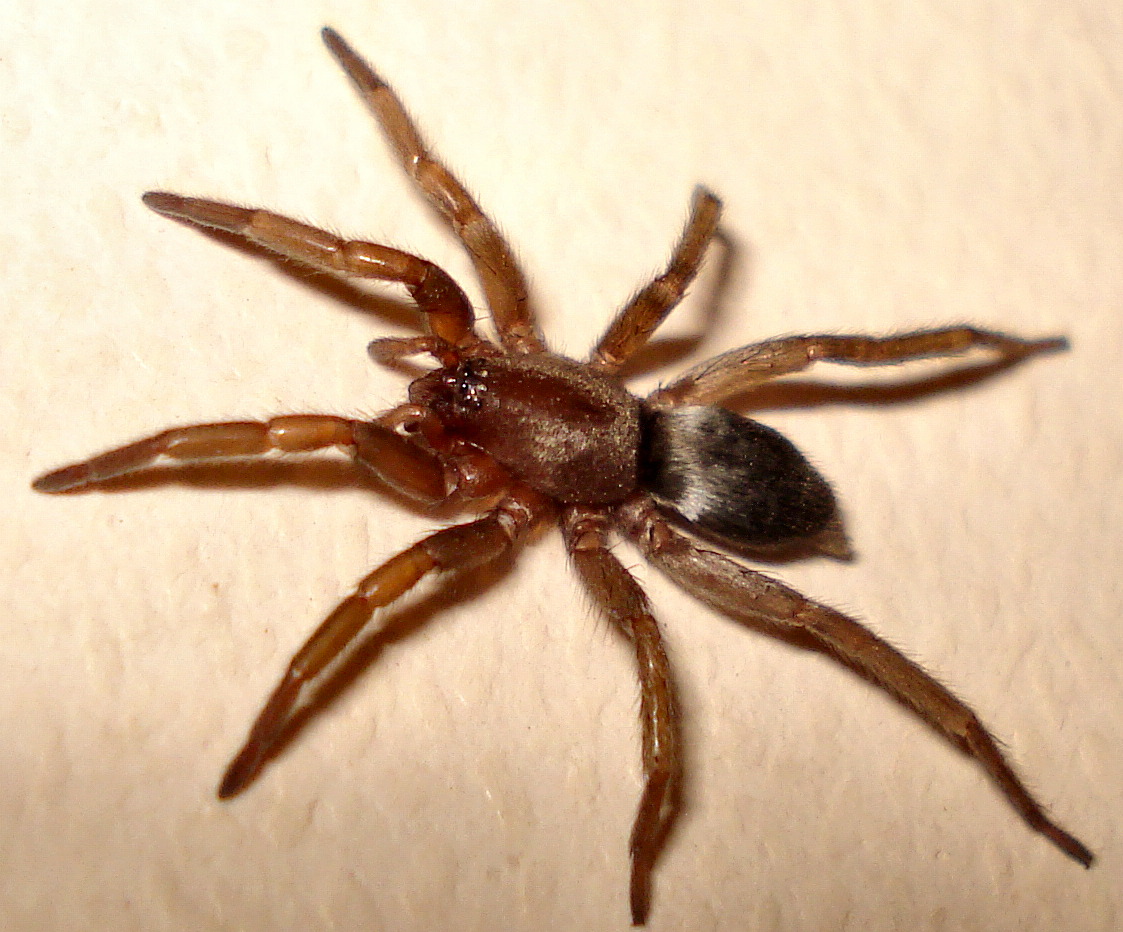

Scientific classification
- Kingdom: Animalia
- Phylum: Arthropoda
- Subphylum: Chelicerata
- Class: Arachnida
- Order: Araneae
- Infraorder: Araneomorphae
- Family: Gnaphosidae
- Genus: Scotophaeus
- Species: S. blackwalli

Binomial name
- Scotophaeus blackwalli (Thorell, 1871)

= Scotophaeus blackwalli =

Species of spider

Scotophaeus blackwalli, also known as the mouse spider, is a species of spider belonging to the family Gnaphosidae.

It is a ground spider and does not create webs. Instead it hunts for insects and other spiders at night and uses its enlarged spinnerets to produce a sticky silk to subdue its prey. It is also an opportunistic scavenger.

Females also use their silk to build protective nests for their eggs.

== Description ==
The adult males of these spiders reach 9mm in length, maturing in the early summer, while females reach 12mm, and can be found until autumn.

The carapace is dark brown while the abdomen is brown/grey with hairs resembling the body of a mouse, hence the common name of 'mouse spider'. The legs are brown with thick pubescence. The male has a small scutum on the dorsum of the abdomen.

== Distribution and habitat ==
Scotophaeus blackwalli is native to Europe, the Caucasus, Turkey and Iran. It has been introduced to North America, Peru, and Hawaii. It is commonly found around and inside houses in Britain, usually in the Autumn, and also under bark and in holes in walls in warmer parts of Europe. It hunts nocturnally.

== Subspecies ==
- Scotophaeus blackwalli isabellinus (Simon, 1873) — Corsica, Italy, Croatia
- Scotophaeus blackwalli politus (Simon, 1878) — France
