= List of mountain passes of North West (province) =

This is a list of publicly accessible, motorable passes in the North West Province, South Africa.
See Mountain Passes of South Africa

Name	Location	Crosses	Highest Point (m)	Road	Between towns	Road surface
Maanhaarrand Pass (Breedtsnek)	25.8639°S 27.4444°E					
Pampoen Nek Pass		Magaliesberg		R512	Broederstroom and Brits	
