= List of mountain passes in Alabama =

The following is a list of mountain passes and gaps in the U.S. state of Alabama.

Name	Mountain range	County	Elevation	Coordinates	Primary access route	Other access route(s)	GNIS
Brock Gap	Cahaba Ridges	Jefferson	518 feet (158 m)	33°20′12″N 86°52′15″W	Brocks Gap Parkway	CSX Railroad	151699
