= Simon Bezuidenhout =

South African cricketer (1946–2023)

Personal information
- Full name: Simon Jurgens Bezuidenhout
- Born: 11 July 1946; Pretoria, Transvaal, South Africa
- Died: 1 September 2023 (aged 77)
- Batting: Right-handed
- Bowling: Right-arm off-spin

Domestic team information
- Years: Team
- 1968–69 to 1982–83: Eastern Province

Career statistics
Competition	First-class	List A
Matches	87	32
Runs scored	4593	988
Batting average	29.25	31.87
100s/50s	8/21	1/5
Top score	141	114*
Balls bowled	335	90
Wickets	6	3
Bowling average	30.66	18.33
5 wickets in innings	0	0
10 wickets in match	0	n/a
Best bowling	3/55	3/32
Catches/stumpings	41/–	7/–
- Source: Cricinfo, 4 April 2022

Simon Jurgens Bezuidenhout (11 July 1946 – 1 September 2023) was a South African cricketer who played first-class cricket for Eastern Province in South Africa from 1968 to 1982.

Bezuidenhout was a batsman who spent most of his career as an opener. His highest first-class score was 141, batting at number six in the 1970–71 Currie Cup against Transvaal. His highest List A cricket score was 114 not out against the South Africa African XI in 1976–77.
