= Sani Pass =

Mountain pass in South Africa and Lesotho

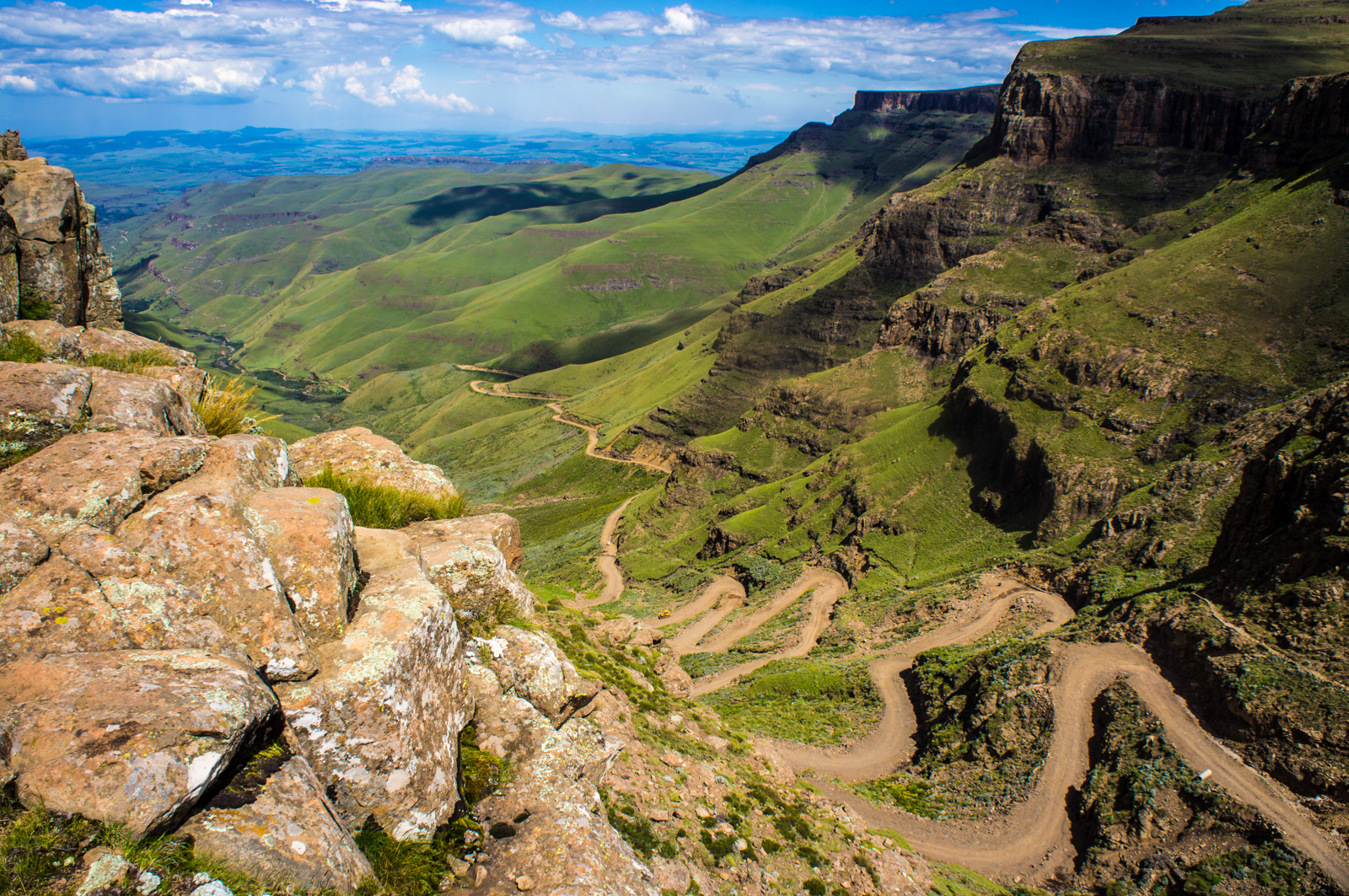

- Location within KwaZulu-Natal Location within Lesotho
- Elevation: 2,876 m (9,436 ft)

Location
- Location: Border of KwaZulu Natal, South Africa and Mokhotlong, Lesotho
- Range: Drakensberg Mountains
- Coordinates: 29°35′17.3″S 29°17′33.8″E

Sani Pass is a mountain pass located in the West of KwaZulu-Natal, South Africa on the road between Himeville, KwaZulu-Natal and Mokhotlong, Lesotho. The pass traverses the Great Escarpment of southern Africa in its highest region, the Drakensberg Mountains, which reach an elevation of over 3,000 meters.

== Route ==
The route up Sani Pass starts at 1,544 metres (5,066 ft), and climbs 1,332 m (4,370 ft) to an altitude of 2,876 m (9,436 ft). The steep gravel road has gradients up to 1:3, which can be difficult to drive in bad weather and may be covered with snow and ice in winter. South Africa generally allows only 4x4 vehicles on the road. The pass lies between the border controls of both countries and is approximately 9 km in length. Caution must be exercised and motorists must be alert while navigating the pass as it has claimed many lives. Occasionally the remains of vehicles that did not succeed in navigating the pass's steep gradients and poor traction surfaces can be seen.

== History ==
Prior to being called the Sani Pass, the route was used by the San people and later the Bantu to cross the mountain range. In 1922, the Basutoland government constructed a 2-metre track to connect Mokhotlong with civilisation but was only accessible by pack animals. From 1949, David Alexander, from Natal, set up a transport business using jeeps to move supplies and people between Himeville and Mokhotlong and return. From 1956, tourists started adventure drives up the pass. In 1958, the pass was further improved but was still dangerous and accessible only by four-wheel drive vehicles. When Alexander's business ended, the Mokhotlong Mountain Transport Company continued the route. In 1966, The Star newspaper sponsored the first Roof of Africa Rally climb over the pass, organised by the Sports Car Club.

The first vehicle to ever summit the pass was a war-surplus Willys Jeep.

== Road upgrades ==
The Sani Pass dirt road will be upgraded in two phases; phase 1 extends for 14 km from the P318 (Sani Pass) turnoff and finishes at the old Good Hope Trading Post, and phase 2 extends from kilometer 14 to kilometer 33, the summit of Sani Pass. Construction work for the first phase commenced in December 2006 and was completed in September 2012.

An economic impact study for phase 2 was compiled in August 2011. and its environmental impact assessment was compiled in October 2011. On 2 July 2013 the South African Department of Environmental Affairs and Tourism approved the execution of phase 2 of the project, with the ultimate objective to re-gravel the final 5 km of the pass. The department also authorized plans to upgrade the storm-water drainage system and retaining walls along the route to reduce sand and gravel erosion.

On 21 May 2014 the South African Environmental Affairs Minister, Edna Molewa, approved the execution of phase 2. Tarring was planned to start within five months following the announcement and would bring the total cost of the project to R887-million. In July 2015 it was stated that phase 2 shall be completed in 2019. As of August 2018 there was no timeline for phase 3.

As of May 2021 the third phase had yet to start, and the finishing of phase 2 was largely, but not entirely complete.

== Border regulations ==
While South African emigration at the bottom of the pass prohibits vehicles deemed unsuitable for the journey, the Lesotho border agents at the summit generally allow vehicles of all types to attempt the descent. The pass is often closed due to adverse weather conditions, especially during winter.

The respective border control stations open at 6:00 and close at 18:00.

The South African/Lesotho border is at the summit of the pass and not at the South African border control point. Sani Pass therefore lies entirely within South Africa.

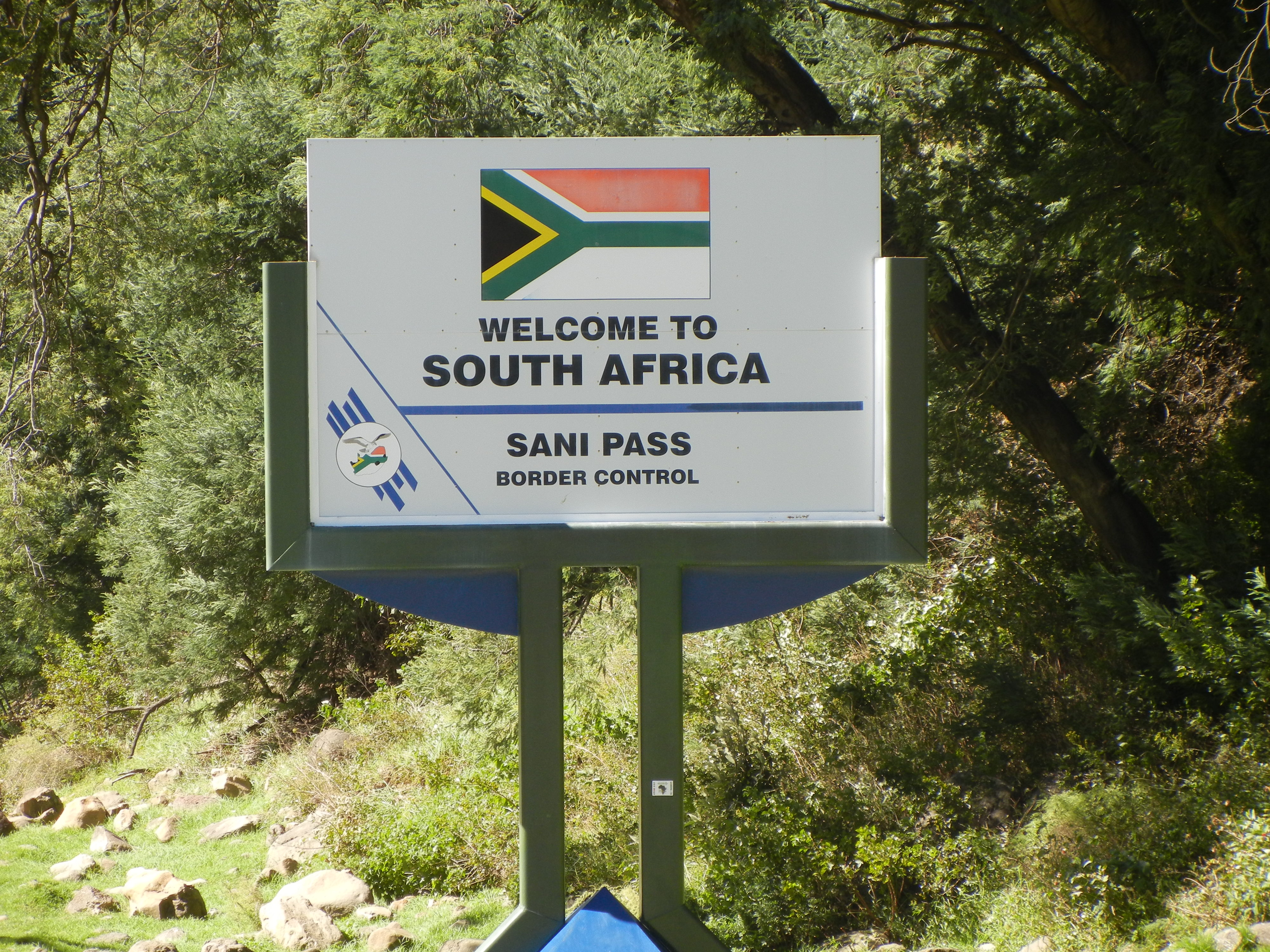
S.A. Border Control

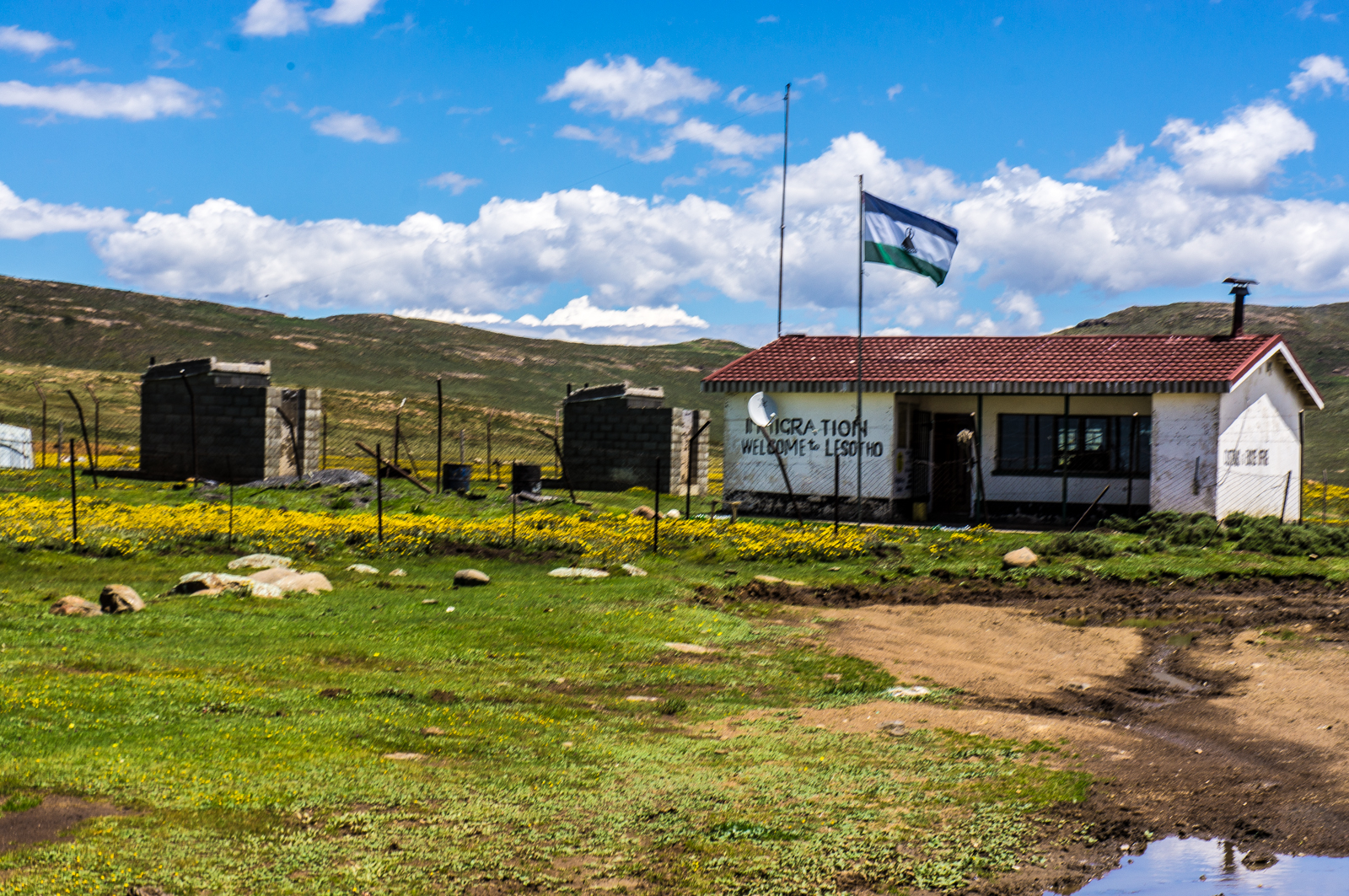
Lesotho Border Post

== Television appearances ==
- Perilous Journeys episode, "The Roof of Africa".
- Top Gear, Series 23, Episode 2
- Extreme Frontiers – South Africa
- "10th Adventure Film Challenge" Beyond The Outdoors ZA, Thabana Ntlenyana Expedition 2023.

== Gallery ==
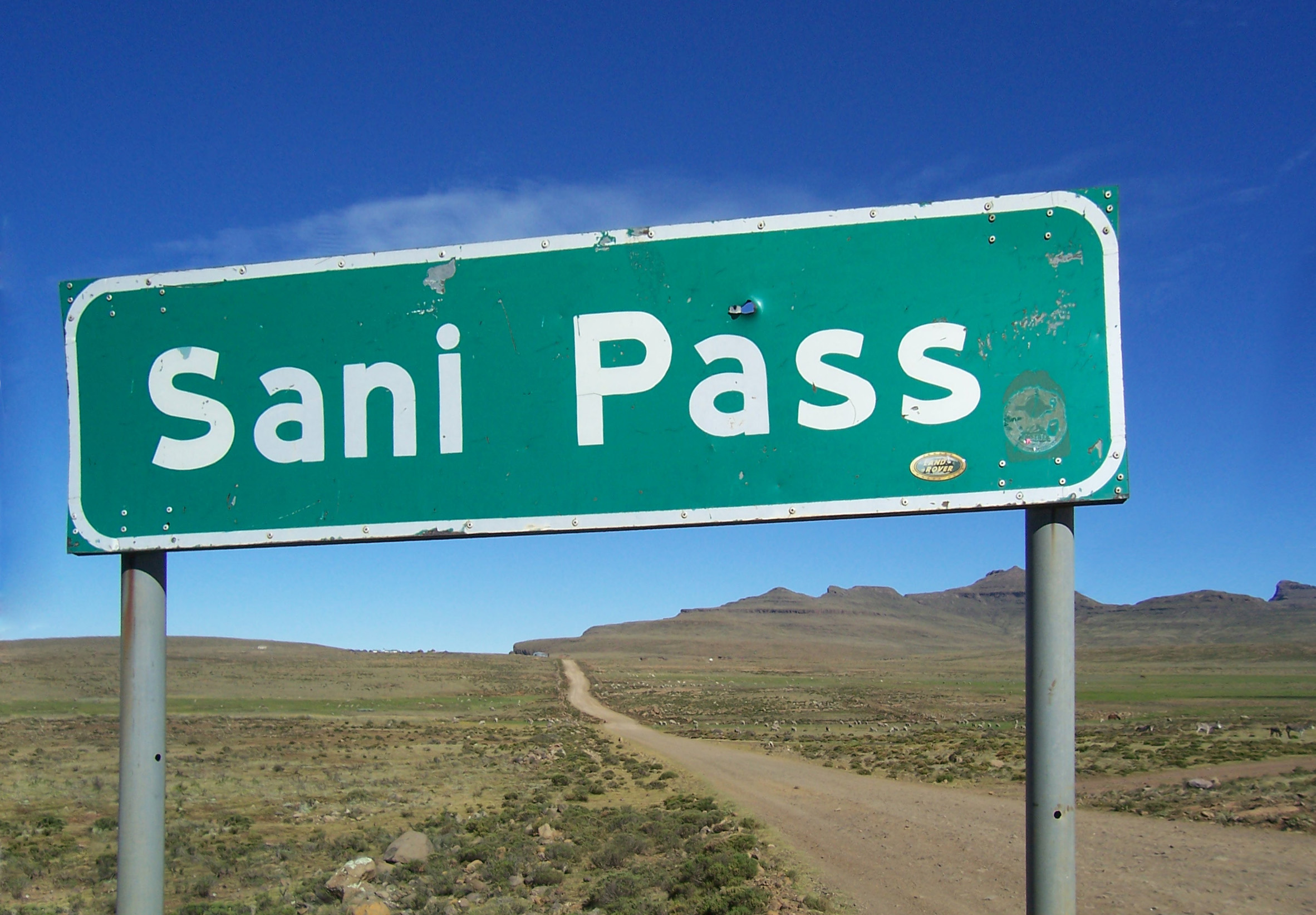
Sign board

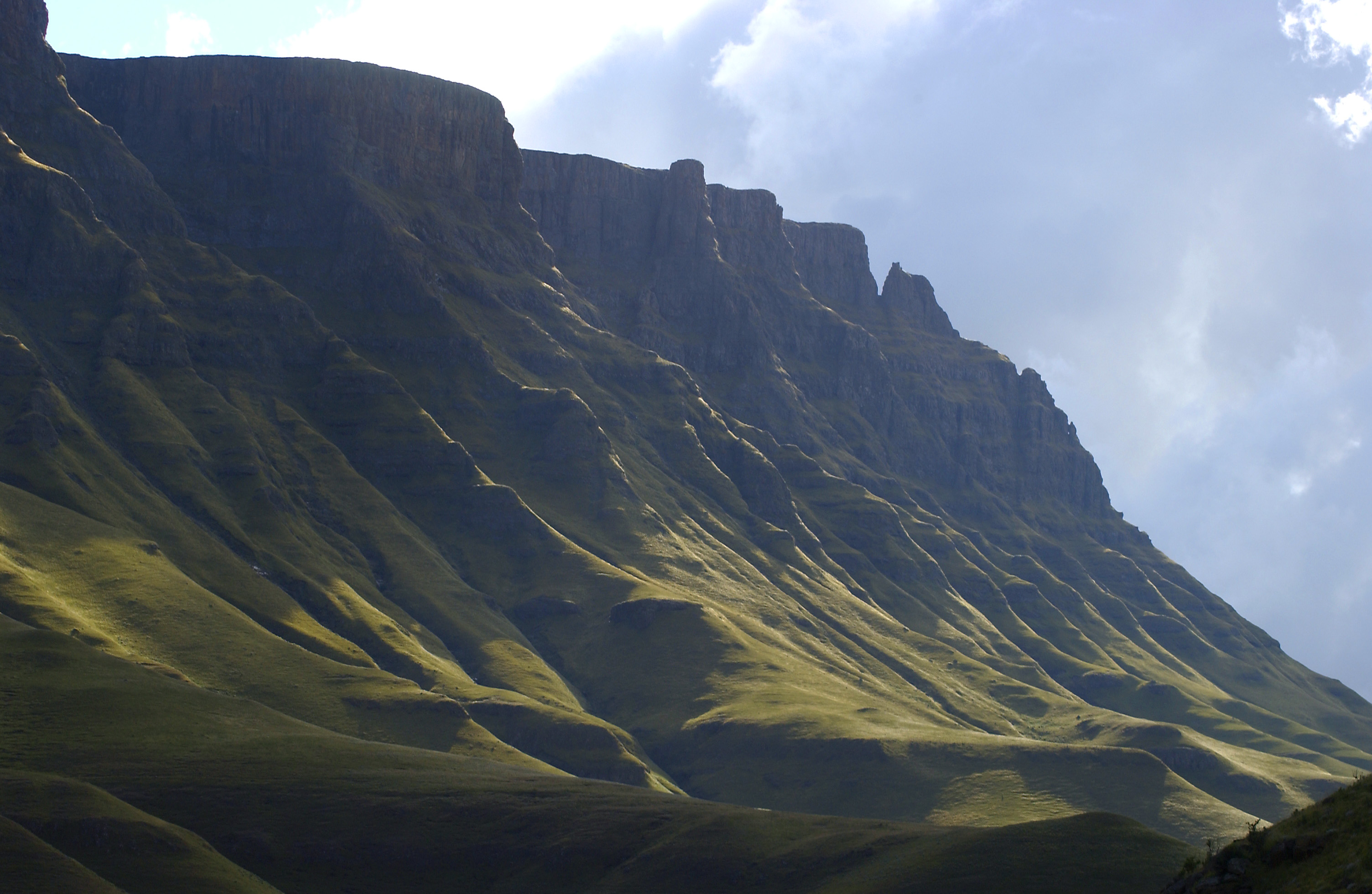
The mountains of the Sani Pass

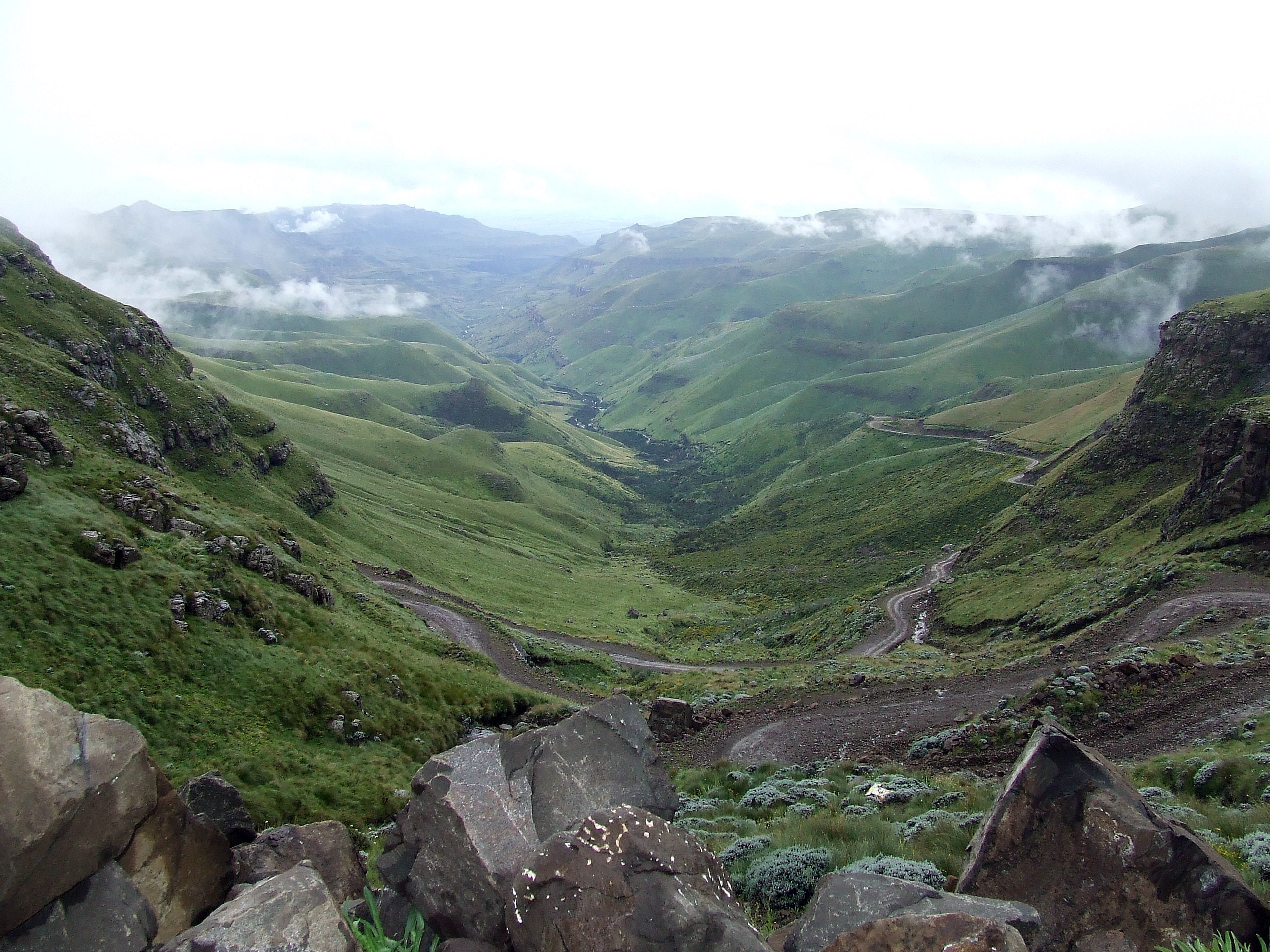
View down into South Africa

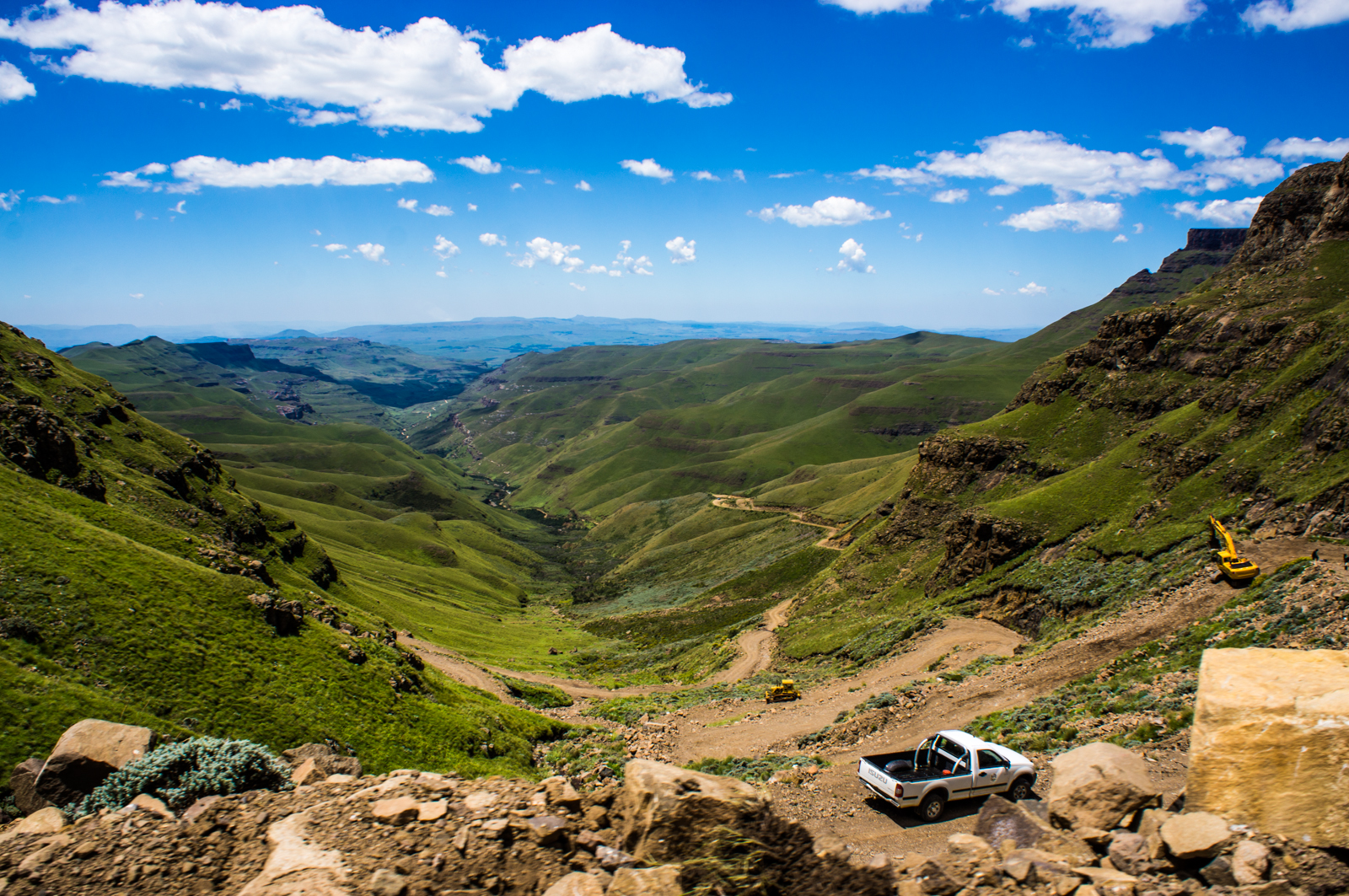
A vehicle traversing the pass

== See also ==
- Mountain passes of South Africa
- KwaZulu Natal Passes
- Hela Hela Pass
- Swartberg Pass
