= Knight's Pass =

- Location within KwaZulu-Natal
- Elevation: 1,662 metres (5,453 ft)

Third Approach
- Location: Near Utrecht, KwaZulu-Natal, South Africa
- Range: Balele Mountains
- Coordinates: 27°39′21.6″S 30°22′23.5″E

Knight's Pass is a mountain pass located in the KwaZulu-Natal province of South Africa near Utrecht.
