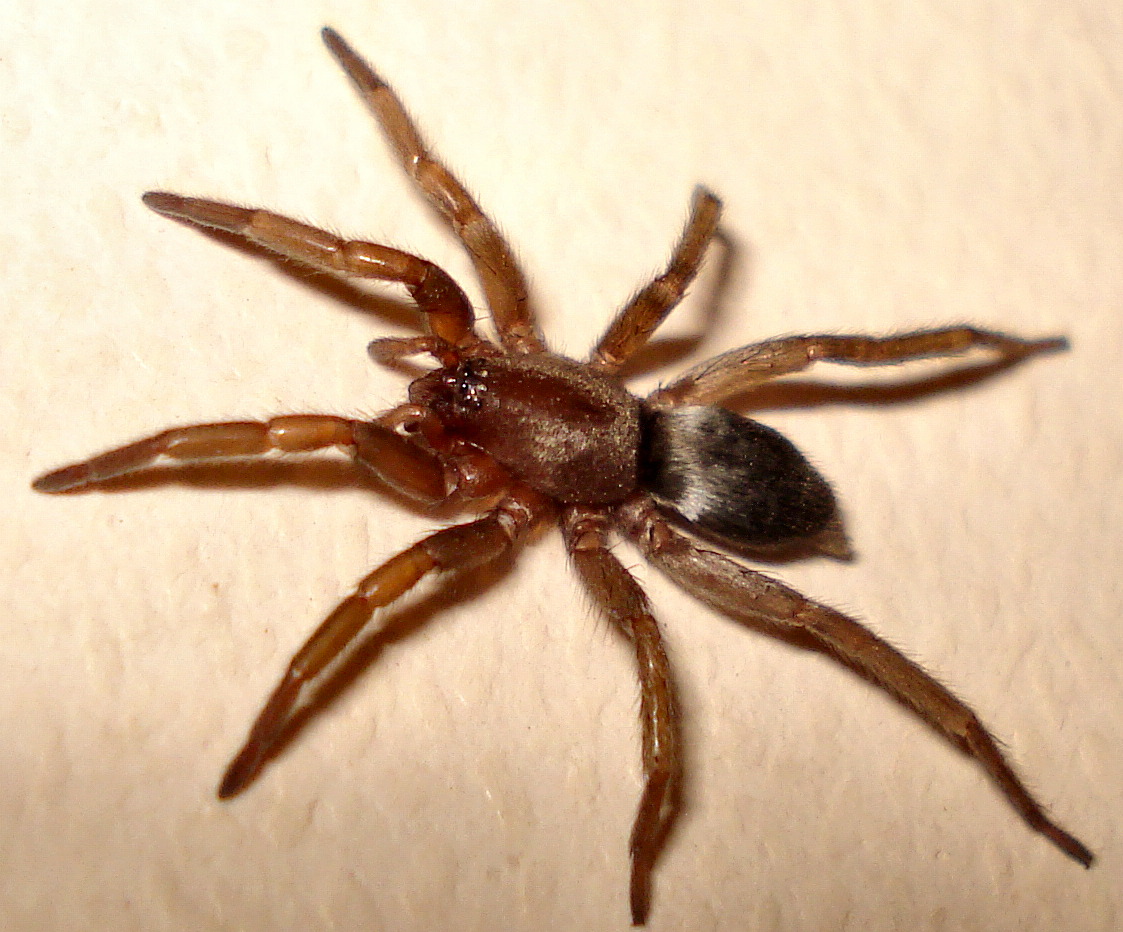
- Scotophaeus blackwalli
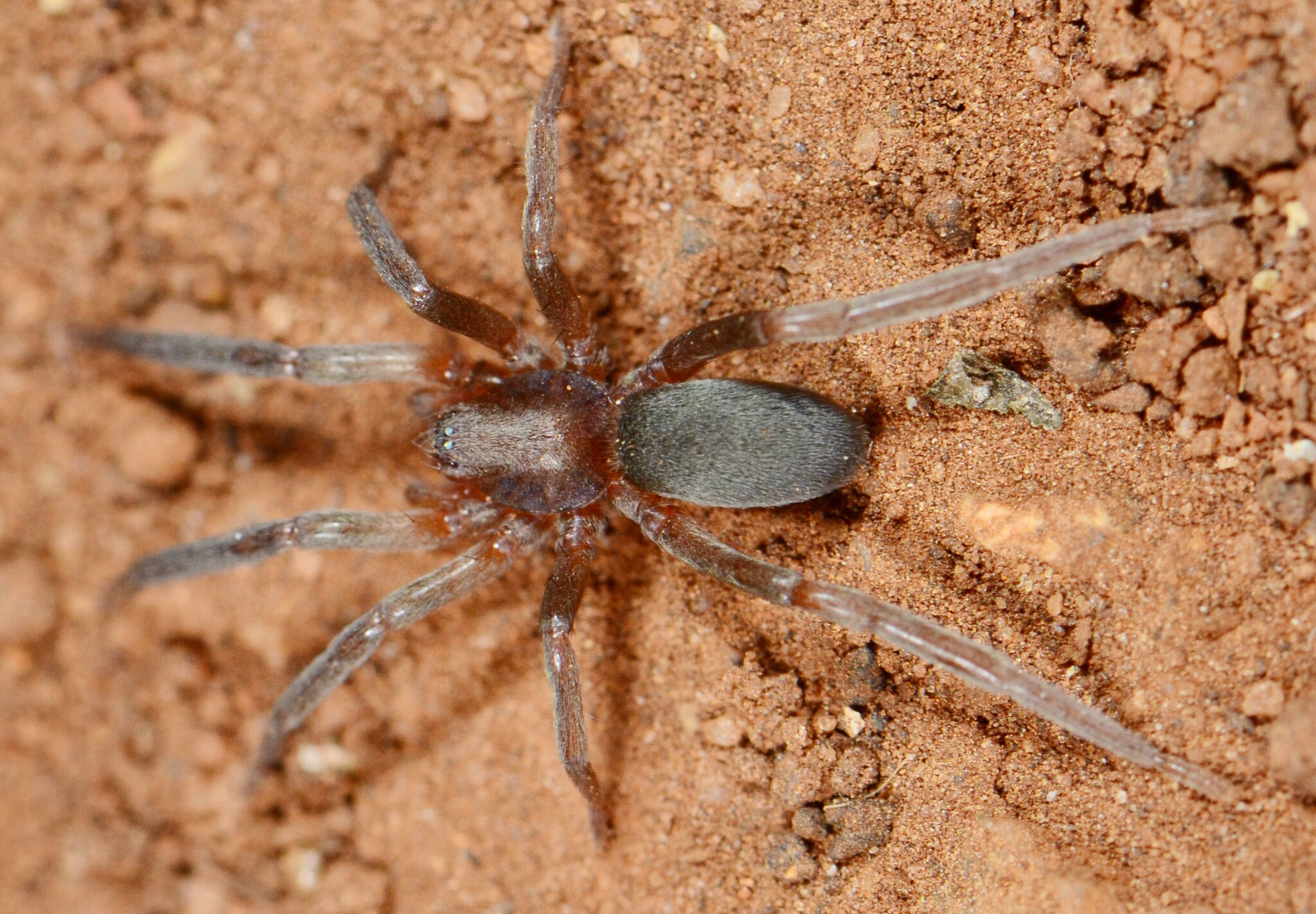
- female S. natalensis

Scientific classification
- Kingdom: Animalia
- Phylum: Arthropoda
- Subphylum: Chelicerata
- Class: Arachnida
- Order: Araneae
- Infraorder: Araneomorphae
- Family: Gnaphosidae
- Genus: Scotophaeus; Simon, 1893

Type species
- S. quadripunctatus (Linnaeus, 1758)

Species
- 61, see text

= Scotophaeus =

Genus of spiders

Scotophaeus is a genus of ground spiders that was first described by Eugène Simon in 1893.

== Species ==
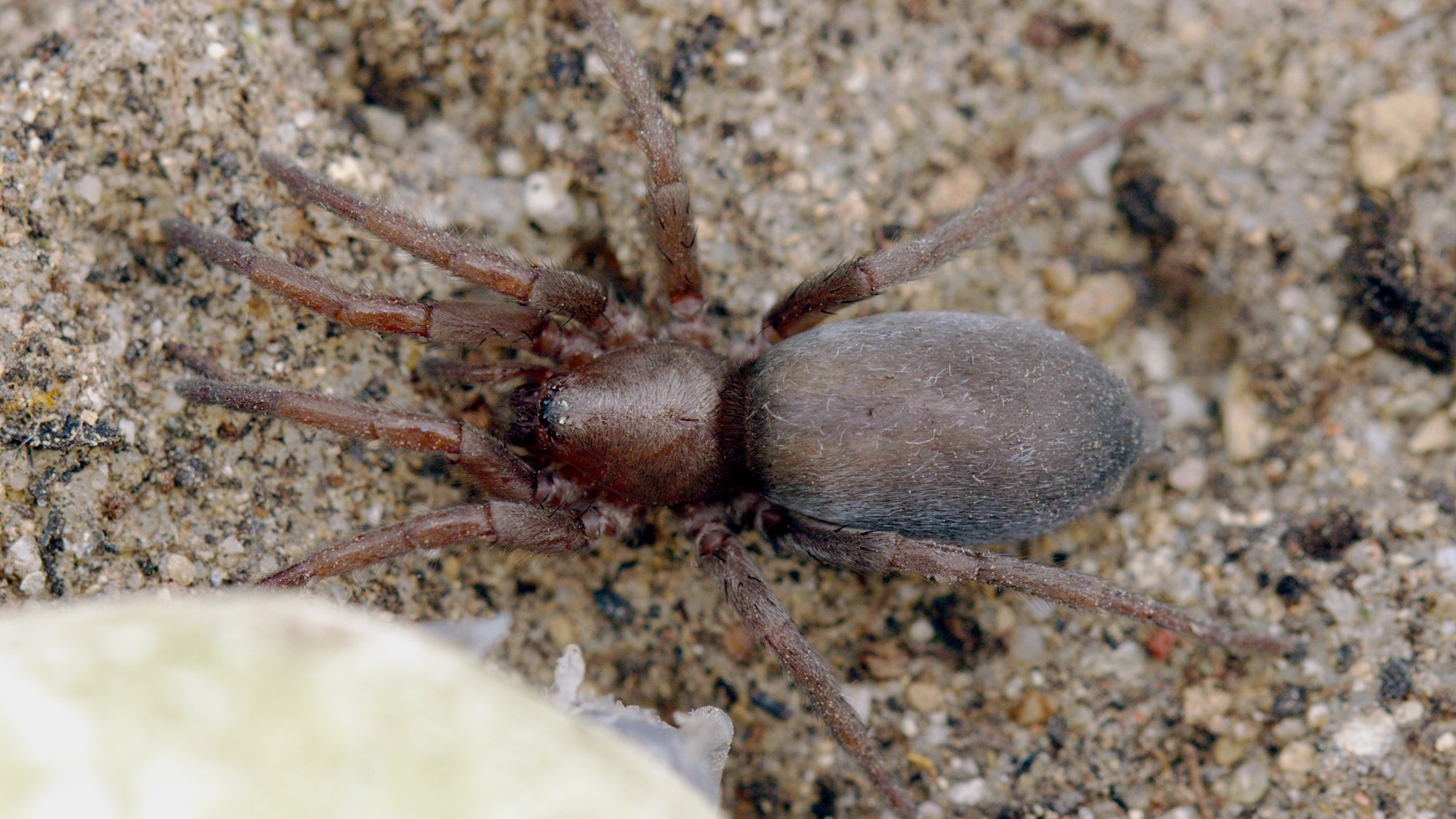
female S. quadripunctatus

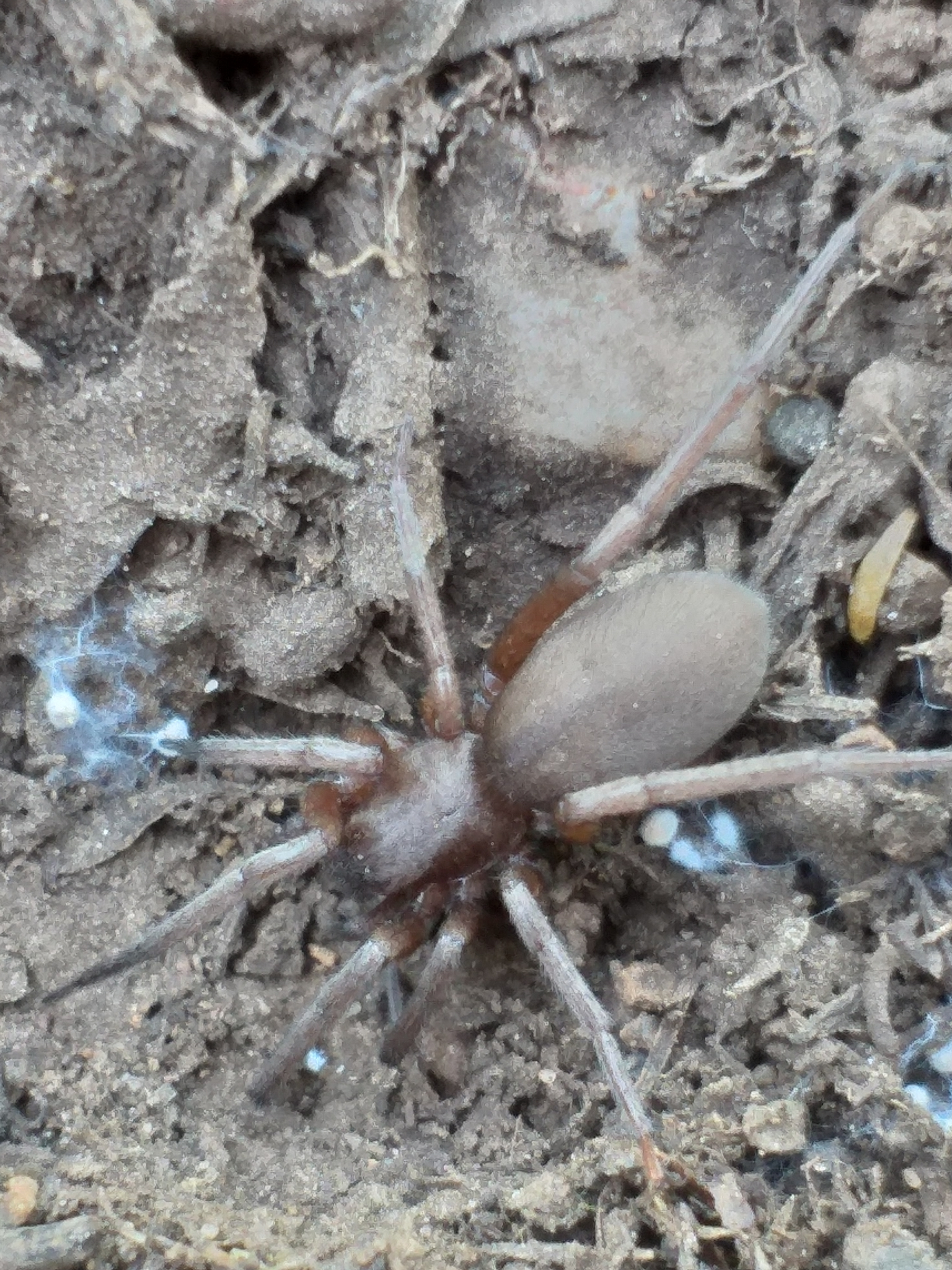
S. relegatus

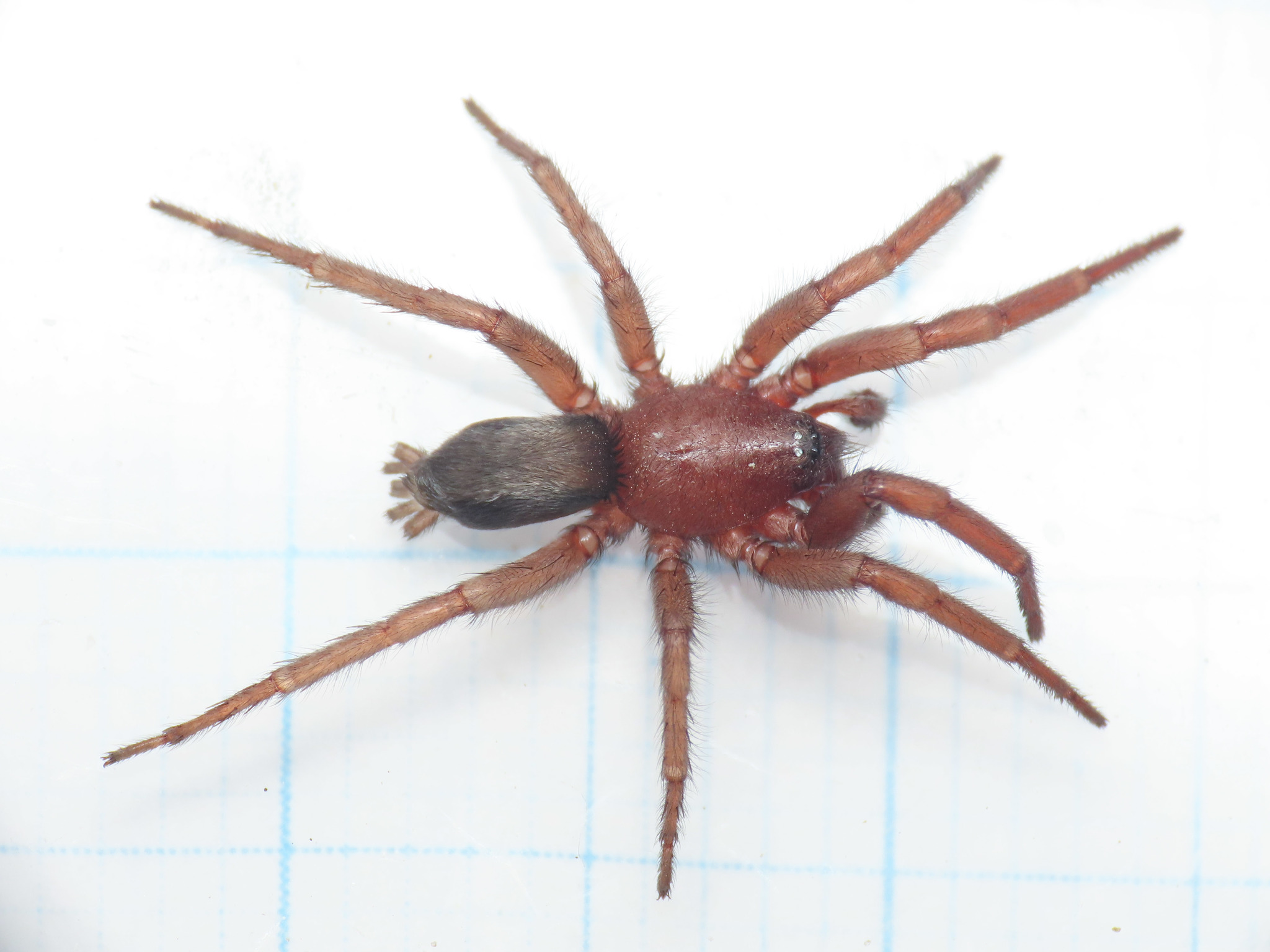
male S. scutulatus

As of September 2025, this genus includes 61 species and two subspecies:

- Scotophaeus aculeatus Simon, 1914 – France
- Scotophaeus affinis Caporiacco, 1949 – Kenya
- Scotophaeus afghanicus Roewer, 1961 – Afghanistan
- Scotophaeus anahita Zamani, Chatzaki, Esyunin & Marusik, 2021 – Iran
- Scotophaeus arboricola Jézéquel, 1965 – Ivory Coast
- Scotophaeus bharatae Gajbe, 1989 – India
- Scotophaeus bifidus Schmidt & Krause, 1994 – Cape Verde
- Scotophaeus blackwalli (Thorell, 1871) – Europe, Algeria, Tunisia, Turkey, Caucasus, Turkey, Iran. Introduced to North America, Peru, Hawaii
  - Scotophaeus blackwalli isabellinus (Simon, 1873) – France (Corsica), Italy, Croatia
  - Scotophaeus blackwalli politus (Simon, 1878) – France
- Scotophaeus brolemanni Simon, 1914 – France
- Scotophaeus cecileae Barrion & Litsinger, 1995 – Philippines
- Scotophaeus correntinus Mello-Leitão, 1945 – Argentina
- Scotophaeus crinitus Jézéquel, 1965 – Ivory Coast
- Scotophaeus dolanskyi Lissner, 2017 – Portugal, Spain, Morocco
- Scotophaeus domesticus Tikader, 1962 – India
- Scotophaeus elburzensis Zamani, Chatzaki, Esyunin & Marusik, 2021 – Iran
- Scotophaeus fabrisae Caporiacco, 1950 – Italy
- Scotophaeus faisalabadiensis Ghafoor & Beg, 2002 – Pakistan
- Scotophaeus goaensis (Tikader, 1982) – India
- Scotophaeus gridellii Caporiacco, 1928 – Canary Islands
- Scotophaeus hierro Schmidt, 1977 – Canary Islands
- Scotophaeus hunan Zhang, Song & Zhu, 2003 – China, Japan
- Scotophaeus insularis Berland, 1936 – Cape Verde, Greece
- Scotophaeus jacksoni Berland, 1936 – Cape Verde
- Scotophaeus jinlin Song, Zhu & Zhang, 2004 – China
- Scotophaeus kalimpongensis Gajbe, 1992 – India
- Scotophaeus lamperti Strand, 1906 – Namibia
- Scotophaeus lindbergi Roewer, 1961 – Afghanistan
- Scotophaeus madalasae Tikader & Gajbe, 1977 – India
- Scotophaeus marleyi Tucker, 1923 – South Africa
- Scotophaeus mauckneri Schmidt, 1956 – Canary Islands
- Scotophaeus merkaricola Strand, 1907 – India
- Scotophaeus meruensis Tullgren, 1910 – East Africa
- Scotophaeus microdon Caporiacco, 1933 – Libya
- Scotophaeus musculus (Simon, 1878) – Salvages, Madeira, France
- Scotophaeus nanoides Wunderlich, 2011 – Portugal, Spain, Morocco
- Scotophaeus nanus Wunderlich, 1995 – Switzerland, Austria
- Scotophaeus natalensis Lawrence, 1938 – Zimbabwe, South Africa
- Scotophaeus nigrosegmentatus (Simon, 1895) – Pakistan (Karakorum), Mongolia
- Scotophaeus nyrensis Simon, 1909 – East Africa
- Scotophaeus peninsularis Roewer, 1928 – Bulgaria, Greece (incl. Crete), Cyprus, Israel
- Scotophaeus poonaensis Tikader, 1982 – India
- Scotophaeus pregoensis Wunderlich, 2023 – Portugal
- Scotophaeus pretiosus (L. Koch, 1873) – New Zealand
- Scotophaeus purcelli Tucker, 1923 – South Africa
- Scotophaeus quadripunctatus (Linnaeus, 1758) – Europe, Russia (Caucasus) (type species)
- Scotophaeus rajasthanus Tikader, 1966 – India
- Scotophaeus rebellatus (Simon, 1880) – China
- Scotophaeus regularis Tullgren, 1910 – East Africa
- Scotophaeus relegatus Purcell, 1907 – Namibia, South Africa
- Scotophaeus retusus (Simon, 1878) – France
- Scotophaeus rufescens (Kroneberg, 1875) – Central Asia
- Scotophaeus schenkeli Caporiacco, 1949 – Kenya
- Scotophaeus scutulatus (L. Koch, 1866) – Europe, Algeria, Turkey, Caucasus, Russia (Europe to South Siberia), Iran, Central Asia
- Scotophaeus semitectus (Simon, 1886) – Senegal
- Scotophaeus simlaensis Tikader, 1982 – India, China
- Scotophaeus strandi Caporiacco, 1940 – Ethiopia
- Scotophaeus tubicola Schmidt, 1990 – Canary Islands
- Scotophaeus typhlus Schmidt & Piepho, 1994 – Cape Verde Is.
- Scotophaeus validus (Lucas, 1846) – Southern Europe, Morocco, Algeria, Tunisia
- Scotophaeus westringi Simon, 1914 – France
- Scotophaeus xizang Zhang, Song & Zhu, 2003 – India, China
