= Madimbo Corridor =

Military base in Limpopo, South Africa

- Location within South Africa Location within Africa
- Coordinates: 22°20′S 30°50′E
- Country: South Africa
- Province: Limpopo
- District: Vhembe
- Municipality: Musina
- Established: 1969

Area
  - Total: 45,000 ha (110,000 acres)
- Time zone: UTC+2 (SAST)

The Madimbo Corridor is a northern military base in the Limpopo Province that borders Zimbabwe in South Africa, and is contiguous with the Matshakatini Nature Reserve. It is controlled by the South African National Defence Force and used as a military training zone and a cordon sanitaire.

== History ==
=== Pre-20th century ===
In the 19th century, local residents began to encounter other groups of people in Africa, mainly commercial hunters. For a time, the hunters and settlers were able to coexist through trades of ivory and skin. However, these relations began to deteriorate with the increase of sport hunting and the introduction of land policies in the late 1890s.

=== Colonial expansion ===
Beginning in 1871, colonists sold land to cattle farmers as a means to expand their control of the area.

=== Establishment to present day ===
In 1969, the base was established after the forced removal of villages in the area. During this time, the base served under the South African Defence Force as one of the country's protective barriers from attacks by neighboring countries. Additionally, in 1992, the corridor was designated as the Matshakatini Nature Reserve.

Beginning in 1994, at the end of South Africa's apartheid government, actions were taken to move relocated villages back to the corridor.

== Climate ==
The Madimbo Corridor experiences an arid to semi-arid climate, with extended dry seasons and shorter wet periods. Its summer temperatures range between a mimimum temperature of 17.4–31 °C (63.3–87.8 °F), with winter temperatures ranging within no less than 10–24 °C (50–75.2 °F). At most, the corridor's annual maximum temperatures have been recorded to range from 38.1 °C (100.6 °F) to 44 °C (111 °F).

The corridor's rainfall has been recorded to be an average of 450 mm (17.7 in) per year. However, studies in 2024 have found a lower amount, ranging from 201–400 mm (7.9–15.7 in), due to the effects of climate change in the region. The area has a maximum annual precipitation of 460 mm (18.1 in).

=== Agriculture ===
The Madimbo Corridor uses a semi-arid irrigation scheme.
