= Rankin's Pass =

Populated place in Limpopo, South Africa

Coordinates: 24°31′53″S 27°54′50″E

Rankin's Pass is a small settlement situated in the Limpopo Province on the road between Thabazimbi and Modimolle (South Africa), near Alma.

Despite the name, Rankin's Pass is not a mountain pass but more of an outpost. It has a police station, a post office, and a shop. Local tradition indicates that it was originally known as "Rankin's Post", after an early resident.
