= List of mountain passes in the Northern Mariana Islands =

The following is a list of mountain passes and gaps in the Commonwealth of the Northern Mariana Islands.

Name	Island	Elevation	Coordinates	Primary access route	Other access route(s)	GNIS
Minachage	Rota	1,516 feet (462 m)	14°08′04″N 145°11′04″E			1390520
Kalabera Pass	Saipan	656 feet (200 m)	15°14′39″N 145°47′01″E			1390444
