= Messelpad Pass =

Coordinates: 29.9066°S 17.6565°E

Messelpad Pass is situated in Namaqualand in the Northern Cape Province of South Africa, on the road between Springbok and Hondeklipbaai.

== Construction history ==
The pass is so named (messelpad, in Afrikaans, means masonry road) on account of the dressed stone embankments which support the road as it descends through the Buffels River valley. Constructed under the supervision of road engineer Patrick Fletcher, the pass was built using convict labour from the Cape. Prisoners were transferred by ship from Cape Town to Hondeklipbaai and thence on foot to a convict station at the bottom of the Buffels River valley, the ruins of which still exist. Work commenced on the pass on 6 February 1867 and it was completed in 1869. Additional work on the Wildepaardehoek Pass, on the same road, was discontinued in March 1871 when Port Nolloth was chosen in preference to Hondeklipbaai for the export of copper from the Namaqualand copper mines.
