= Maanhaarrand Pass =

Mountain pass in South Africa

Maanhaarrand / Breedtsnek Pass
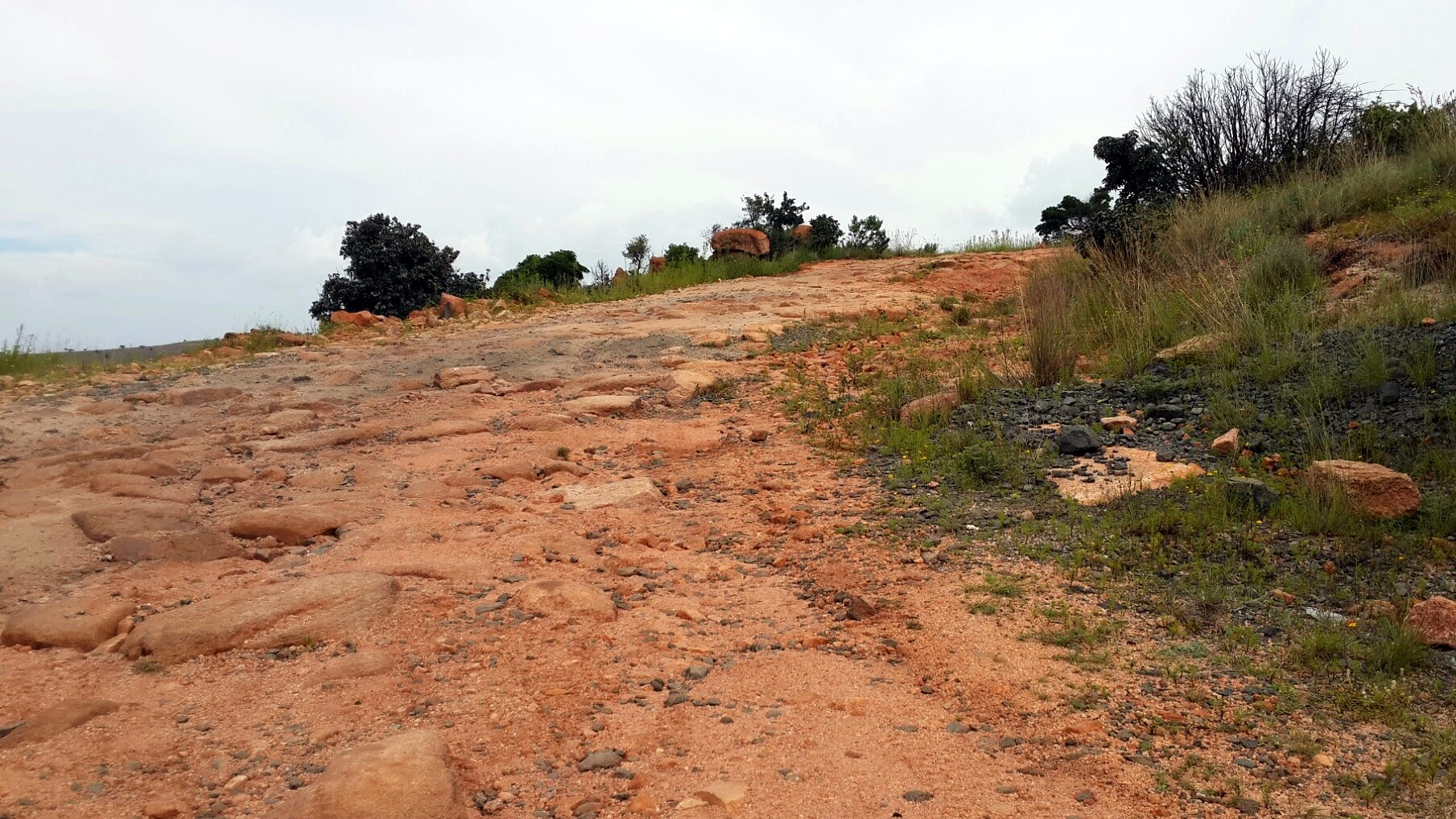
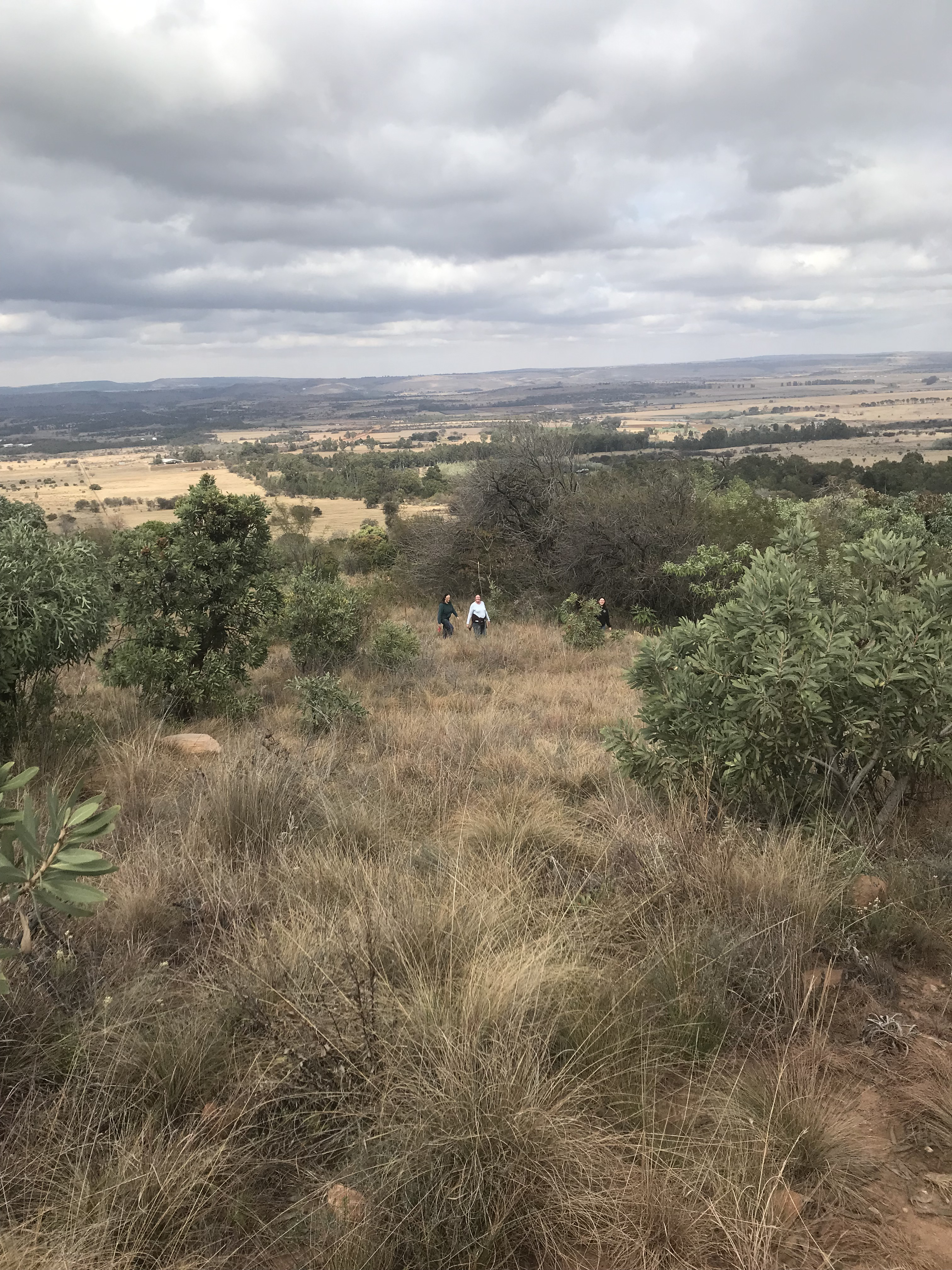
- Magalies terrain
- Interactive map of Maanhaarrand / Breedtsnek Pass

Maanhaarrand Pass, also known as Breedtsnek pass, is a mountain pass situated in the Magaliesberg Reserve in the North West Province in South Africa. The altitude at the summit is 1 716 m and along the route, a range of natural habitats can be seen. These include vlei's, perennial streams, disturbed grasslands densely wooded slopes, rocky mountainous grasslands and farmlands. The Donkey Dairy which with a speciality in producing pure donkey milk, is located on this road.

== Background ==
Maanhaar is Afrikaans for the long hair that is found on a horses or lions mane and it is possible that the rugged mountain ridge (or rand in afrikaans) resembles a mane. From the south, the same pass bears another descriptive name BreedtsNek (wide neck).

== Road Condition ==
The pass connects Maanhaarrand (south) with Buffelspoort and Mooinooi (north) and the Breedtsnek (or Breedt's Nek) route has a reputation for being one of the worst public roads. The gravel surface is labelled the D568 and has dongas and rocky sections. The pass could used between the towns of Magaliesburg and Marikana, but is not recommended Good ground clearance or a 4x4 is suggested, since the conditions of the road are poor to terrible

== Boer War Fort ==
The Magaliesberg was also a site of 10 battles between British and Boers and remnants of a British fort can be found at 25.866781°S 27.446412°E This fort was one of the defences between Breedts Nek and Frederikstad.
