= Bell's Pass =

Mountain pass in Free State, South Africa

Coordinates: 28°32′S 26°57′E

Bell's Pass is a mountain pass situated in the Free State province, South Africa, on the R73 road between Winburg and Bloemfontein.
