= Endoumeni Pass =

South African Pass

- Location within KwaZulu-Natal
- Elevation: 1,375 metres (4,511 ft)
- Traversed by: P33-2

Third Approach
- Location: Between Dundee and Wasbank
- Coordinates: 28°13′47.7″S 30°11′46.1″E

Endoumeni Pass, is situated in the KwaZulu-Natal province of South Africa on the road between Dundee and Wasbank.
