= List of mountain passes of Gauteng =

This is a list of publicly accessible, motorable passes in the Gauteng Province, South Africa.
See Mountain Passes of South Africa

Name	Location	Crosses	Highest Point (m)	Road	Between towns	Road surface
Baviaanspoort	25.67659°S 28.34587°E		25.67659°S 28.34587°E	R513		Tar
Donkerpoort	25.77737°S 28.48258°E		25.77737°S 28.48258°E	R104		Tar
Hekpoort	25.94712°S 27.66781°E		25.94712°S 27.66781°E	R563		Tar
Horns Nek	25.6830°S 28.0687°E		25.68191°S 28.06836°E	M17	Ga-Rankuwa and Booysens	Tar
Munro Drive	26.17375°S 28.06027°E		26.17375°S 28.06027°E	Elm Street		Tar
Paardekraal Pass	26.06464°S 27.81394°E		26.06351°S 27.80687°E	R28	Muldersdrift and Krugersdorp	Tar
Poeiernek	25.91610°S 27.71070°E		25.91610°S 27.71070°E	Hartebeeshoek Road		Tar
Stewart Drive	26.18603°S 28.06735°E		26.18603°S 28.06735°E	Stewart Drive		Tar
Sylvia's Pass	26.16913°S 28.08898°E		26.16913°S 28.08898°E	M33		Tar
Theo Martin's Poort	25.68635°S 28.12124°E		25.68635°S 28.12124°E	R513		Tar
