= List of mountain passes in Florida =

The following is a list of mountain passes and gaps in the U.S. state of Florida.

| Name | Mountain range | County | Elevation | Coordinates | Primary access route | Other access route(s) | GNIS |
|---|---|---|---|---|---|---|---|
| Gator Gap | | Volusia | 23 feet (7.0 m) | 28°51′25″N 81°00′04″W | | | 282976 |
| Moccasin Gap | | Leon | 144 feet (44 m) | 30°36′10″N 84°07′03″W | Old Centerville Road | | 287037 |
| Peterson Cut | | Charlotte | 0 feet (0 m) | 26°54′16″N 82°20′50″W | | | 305028 |
| Roberts Gap | | Charlotte | 0 feet (0 m) | 26°46′29″N 82°11′49″W | | | 289781 |
