= Van Collers Pass =

Mountain pass in South Africa

Van Collers Pass is situated in the Limpopo Province of South Africa, on the road between Alldays and Waterpoort.
