= Saluda Mountains =

Mountain range on the border of North and South Carolina

- Location within North Carolina Location within South Carolina Location within the United States

Highest point
- Peak: Grassy Top Mountain
- Elevation: 3,258 ft (993 m)
- Coordinates: 35°09′22″N 82°31′36″W

Geography
- Country: United States
- States: North Carolina and South Carolina
- Parent range: Blue Ridge Mountains

The Saluda Mountains are a mountain range that straddles along the North Carolina and South Carolina border, in the southeastern United States. They are part of the Blue Ridge Province of the Southern Appalachian Mountains.

== Geography ==
The range begins at Standingstone Mountain, near Caesars Head State Park, and go northeasterly to Blakes Peak, near Saluda, North Carolina. Straddling the North and South Carolina state line, it is flanked by the Green and Saluda rivers.

=== Notable summits ===
Listed are the ten highest summits in the range.

Mountain	Elevation	Coordinates	General area	Named after
Grassy Top Mountain	3,258 feet (993 m)	35°09′21″N 82°31′36″W	Greenville County, SC–Henderson County, NC	
Standingstone Mountain	3,209 feet (978 m)	35°08′39″N 82°34′22″W	Greenville County, SC–Henderson County, NC	
Hogback Mountain	3,130 feet (950 m)	35°09′57″N 82°30′15″W	Greenville County, SC–Henderson County, NC	
Big Top	3,048 feet (929 m)	35°09′57″N 82°29′39″W	Greenville County, SC–Henderson County, NC	
Mackerel Mountain	3,038 feet (926 m)	35°10′28″N 82°29′11″W	Greenville County, SC–Henderson County, NC	
Corbin Mountain	3,031 feet (924 m)	35°10′05″N 82°26′05″W	Greenville County, SC–Henderson County, NC	
Pruett Mountain	3,022 feet (921 m)	35°10′03″N 82°26′04″W	Greenville County, SC	
McCarrol Mountain	2,982 feet (909 m)	35°10′27″N 82°28′27″W	Greenville County, SC–Henderson County, NC	
Frank Mountain	2,933 feet (894 m)	35°10′40″N 82°27′37″W	Greenville County, SC–Henderson County, NC	
Long Mountain	2,923 feet (891 m)	35°11′30″N 82°28′05″W	Henderson County, NC	
