= List of mountain passes in Hawaii =

The following is a list of mountain passes and gaps in the U.S. state of Hawaiʻi.

Name	Island	County	Elevation	Coordinates	Primary access route	Other access route(s)	GNIS
Hole-in-the-Mountain	Island of Kauaʻi	Kauaʻi	1,148 feet (350 m)	22°08′56″N 159°19′41″W			359239
Humuʻula Saddle	Island of Hawaiʻi	Hawaiʻi	6,627 feet (2,020 m)	19°42′00″N 155°29′40″W			359475
Kamehame Gap	Island of Hawaiʻi	Honolulu	20 feet (6.1 m)	21°17′34″N 157°41′02″W	Hawaii Kai Drive		1904633
Knudsen Gap	Island of Kauaʻi	Kauaʻi	600 feet (180 m)	21°56′59″N 159°27′47″W			361324
Kolekole Pass	Island of Oʻahu	Honolulu	1,631 feet (497 m)	21°28′28″N 158°06′50″W	Kolekoke Road		361388
Makapuʻu Gap	Island of Oʻahu	Honolulu	157 feet (48 m)	21°18′33″N 157°39′26″W	Route 72		1904823
Māwae Gate	Island of Hawaiʻi	Hawaiʻi	679 feet (207 m)	19°01′00″N 155°37′27″W			362310
Nenenui Gate	Island of Hawaiʻi	Hawaiʻi	5,072 feet (1,546 m)	19°36′14″N 155°47′25″W			362632
Nuʻuanu Pali	Island of Oʻahu	Honolulu	1,168 feet (356 m)	21°22′01″N 157°47′36″W	Route 61		1853081
Pōhākea Pass	Island of Oʻahu	Honolulu	2,136 feet (651 m)	21°25′49″N 158°05′27″W			363309
Waimanu Gap	Island of Hawaiʻi	Hawaiʻi	2,106 feet (642 m)	20°05′10″N 155°38′32″W			364788
