= Bezuidenhouts Pass =

Mountain pass in KwaZulu-Natal, South Africa

Coordinates: 28°32′54.7″S 29°12′49.7″E

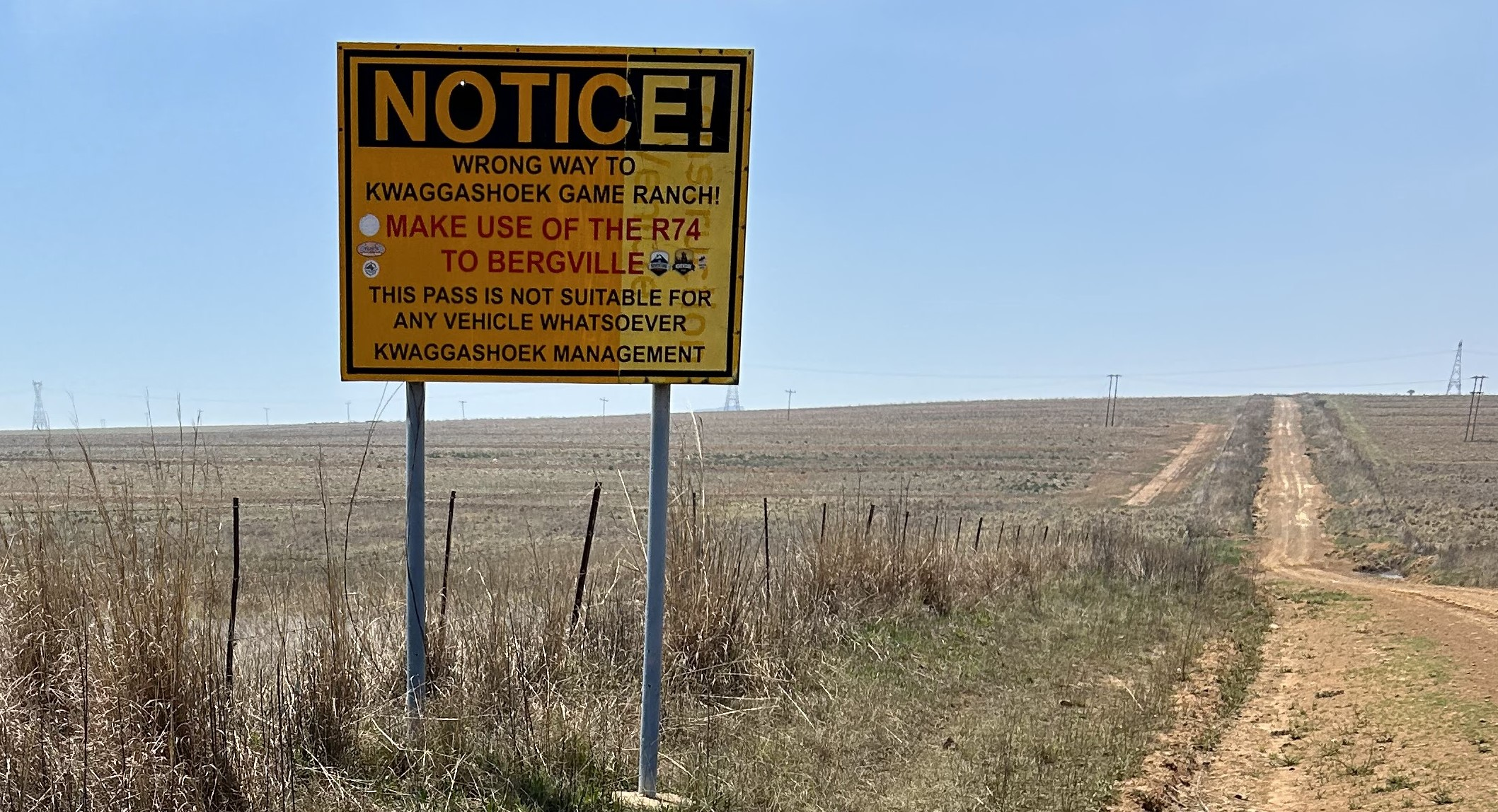
Road to Bezuidenhout's Pass - October 2023

Bezuidenhouts Pass is a mountain pass located in the Drakensberg mountains, in the northern part of KwaZulu-Natal province of South Africa on the road between Harrismith and Bergville. It takes its name from Daniël Bezuidenhout, who owned a farm nearby.

The pass is located between Van Reenen's Pass and Oliviershoek. The gravel road through the pass starts about 1 km outside Harrismith town centre ending up in Bergville. The pass is very remote with very little usage and is very eroded - it is not possible to drive this pass.
