= Hela Hela Pass =

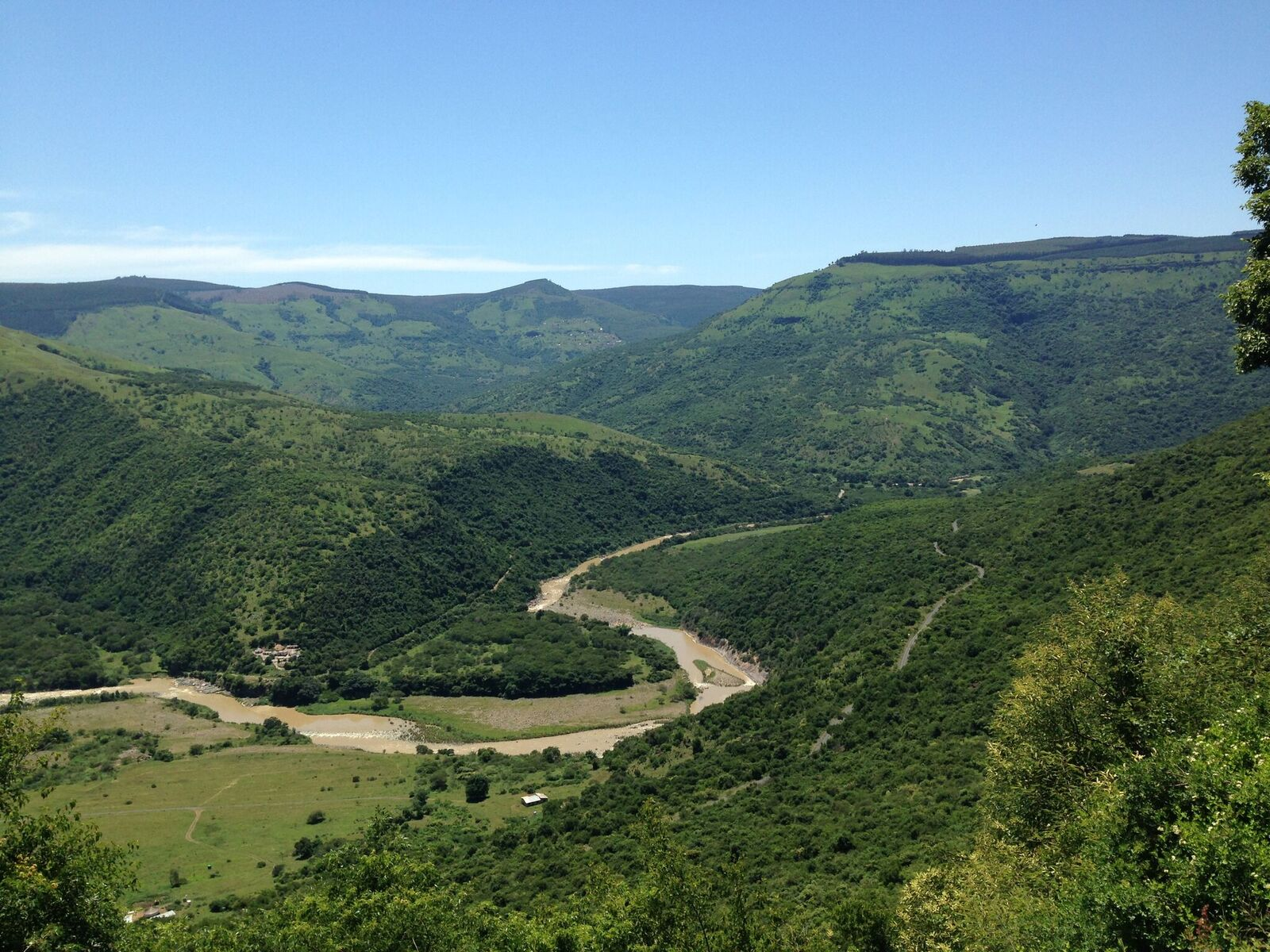
- A view of the Umkomaas valley from Hela Hela Pass

- Location within KwaZulu-Natal
- Elevation: 1,199 metres (3,934 ft)

Third Approach
- Location: Between Richmond and Donnybrook, South Africa
- Coordinates: 29°54′34.6″S 30°4′37.9″E

Hela Hela Pass, also known as Helehele Pass, is situated in the KwaZulu-Natal province of South Africa, on the road between Richmond and Donnybrook.

== Route ==
Access to the pass is by a fairly steep dirt road into the Umkomaas Valley that continues to a bridge that crosses the Umkomaas River at an altitude of 548m. The pass rises by 651m over 7,19 km to reach the summit at an altitude of 1199m. There are gradients of 1:6 on certain sections of the pass which make it treacherous when wet. In dry conditions though, the pass can be driven with an ordinary road vehicle as the hard-packed gravel - although rough - provides good grip.

== Origin of the name ==
There are several versions of the origins of the name of the pass, the most plausible being that due to thick impenetrable bush in the area, the local herders cut a pathway to the grasslands at the top, but this pathway was so narrow that they had to walk in single file. The Zulu word for single file is "ihela ihela".

== Gallery ==
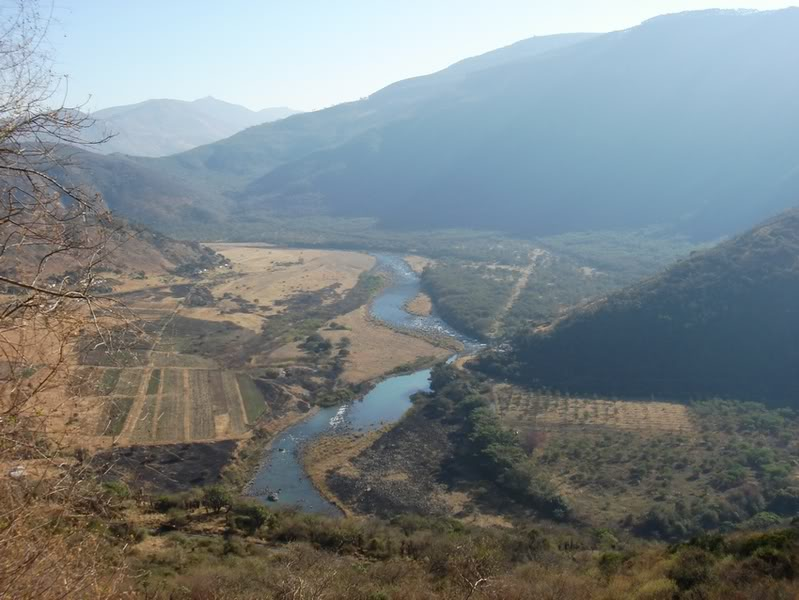
View down from the pass

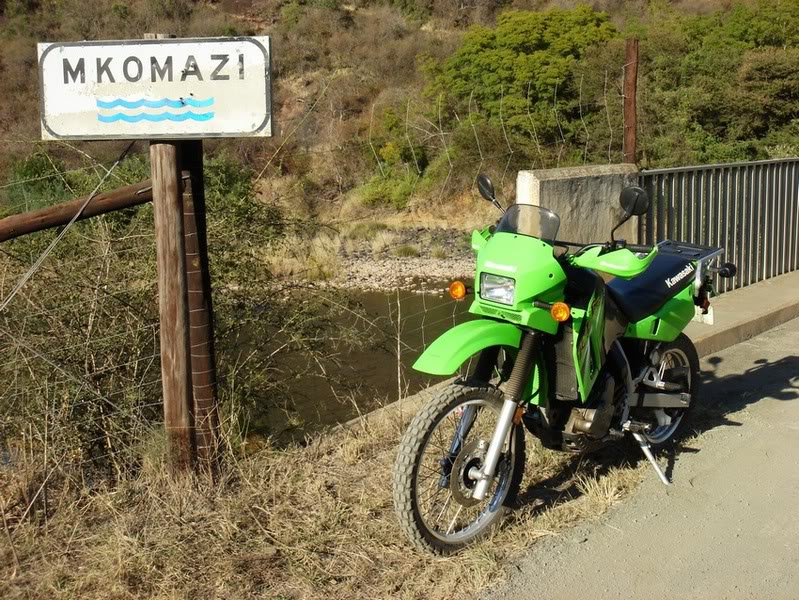
Passing the Mkomazi River
