= List of mountain passes of South Africa =

== Publicly accessible road passes by Province ==
- Eastern Cape Passes
- Western Cape Passes
- Northern Cape Passes
- Free State Passes
- Gauteng Passes
- KwaZulu Natal Passes
- Limpopo Province Passes
- Mpumalanga Passes
- Northwest Province Passes
