= List of mountain passes =

This is a list of mountain passes.

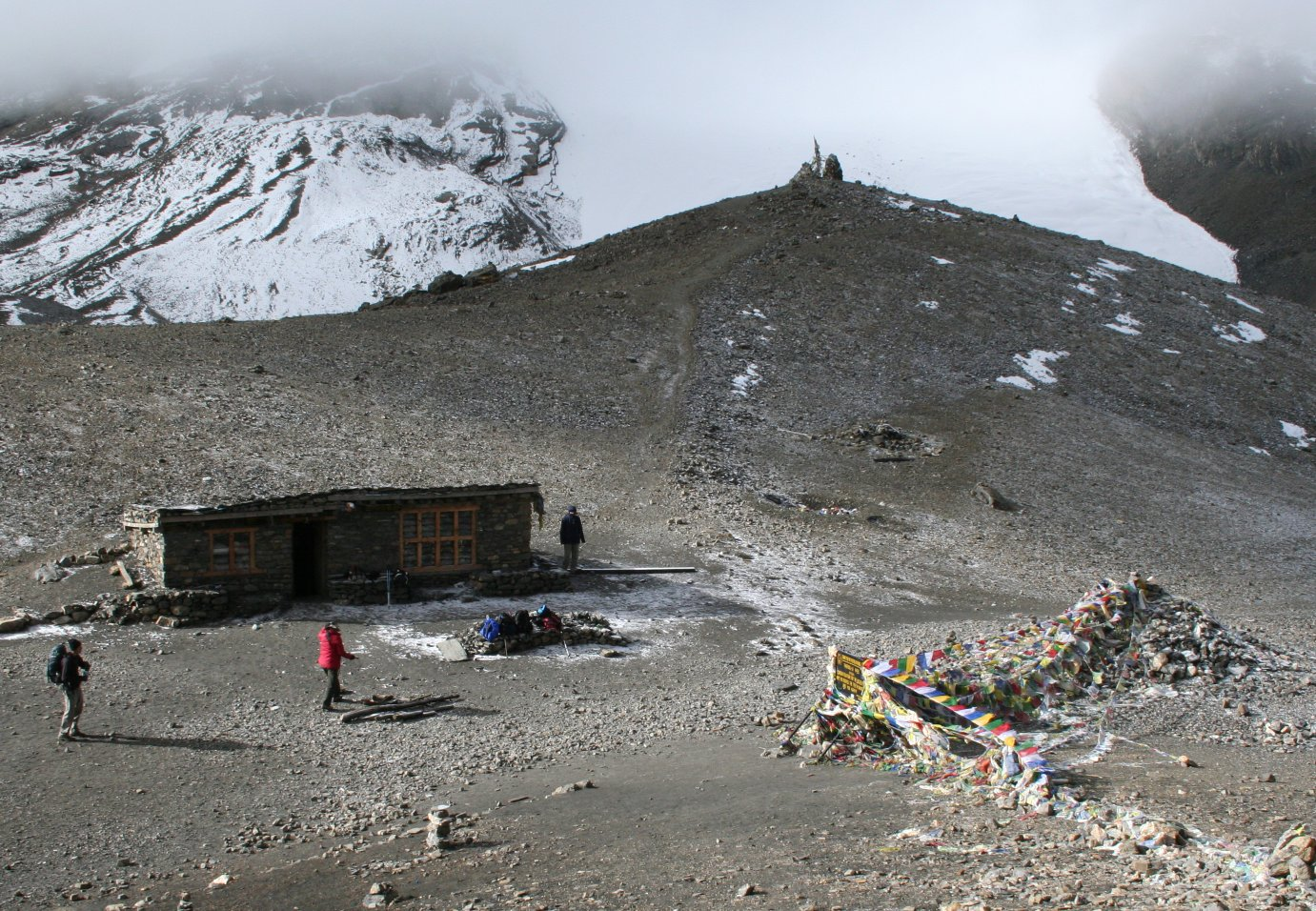
Thorung La pass in Nepal. Trekkers can often find hot tea and a short rest at this hut during the trekking season.

== Africa ==
=== Egypt ===
- Halfaya Pass (near Libya)

=== Lesotho ===
- Moteng Pass
- Mahlasela pass
- Sani Pass

=== Morocco ===
- Tizi n'Tichka

=== South Africa ===
- Eastern Cape Passes
- Western Cape Passes
- Northern Cape Passes
- KwaZulu Natal Passes
- Free State Passes
- Limpopo Province Passes
- Mpumalanga Passes
- Gauteng Passes
- Northwest Province Passes
- Swartberg Pass (Western Cape)
- Lootsberg Pass

== Asia ==
=== Afghanistan ===
- Broghol Pass to Pakistan
- Dorah Pass to Pakistan
- Hajigak Pass
- Khost-Gardez Pass
- Khyber Pass to Pakistan
- Kotal-e Khushk
- Kushan Pass linking northern Afghanistan to the region.
- Lataband Pass
- Tang-e Gharu is a gorge which links Afghanistan with Pakistan
- Salang Pass crosses the Hindu Kush linking Kabul with northern Afghanistan – nowadays through a tunnel.
- Wakhjir Pass to China

=== China ===
- Pingxingguan Pass, Shanxi
- Jiayu Pass, Gansu
- Jianmen Pass, Sichuan
- Niangzi Pass, Border between Shanxi and Hebei
- Yanmen Pass, Shanxi
- Alataw Pass to Kazakhstan
- Dongkhala to India
- Jelep La to India
- Karakoram Pass to India
- Khunjerab Pass to Pakistan
- Kilik Pass to Pakistan
- Kulma Pass to Tajikistan
- Mintaka Pass to Pakistan
- Nathu La to India
- Semo Pass, Tibet (18,258 ft)
- Tanggula Pass, Tibet
- Torugart Pass to Kyrgyzstan
- Irkeshtam Pass to Kyrgyzstan
- Wakhjir Pass to Afghanistan

=== India ===
Name	State	Height (ft/m)	Between/ Separating
Asirgarh pass	Madhya Pradesh		
Auden's Col	Uttarakhand	17,552 ft (5,350 m)	
Kalindi Pass	Uttarakhand	19,521 ft (5,950 m)	
Banihal Pass	Jammu and Kashmir (Jammu, Kashmir)	9,291 ft (2,832 m)	Jammu & Kashmir
Bara-lacha-la	Himachal Pradesh	16,400 ft (5,000 m)	
Bomdila	Arunachal Pradesh	7,925 ft (2,416 m)	
Changla Pass	Ladakh	17,585 ft (5,360 m)	Leh & Changthang
Chanshal Pass	Himachal Pradesh	14,830 ft (4,520 m)	
Dehra Compass	Ladakh	18,007 ft (5,489 m)	
Debsa Pass	Himachal Pradesh	17,520 ft (5,340 m)	
Diphu Pass	Arunachal Pradesh	15,049 ft (4,587 m)	
Bum La Pass	Arunachal Pradesh	15,200 ft (4,600 m)	Tawang & Tsona Dzong
Dongkhala	Sikkim	12,000 ft (3,700 m)	
Fotu La	Ladakh	13,451 ft (4,100 m)	
Goecha La	Sikkim	16,207 ft (4,940 m)	
Haldighati Pass	Rajasthan	4,900 ft (1,500 m)	
Indrahar Pass	Himachal Pradesh	14,473 ft (4,411 m)	
Jelep La	Sikkim	14,300 ft (4,400 m)	
Jalori Pass	Himachal Pradesh	10,280 ft (3,132 m)	
Khardung La	Ladakh	17,582 ft (5,359 m)	Leh & Nubra
Kongka Pass	Ladakh	16,965 ft (5,171 m)	Ladakh & Aksai Chin
Lanak Pass	Ladakh	17,933 ft (5,466 m)	Ladakh & Tibet
Kunzum Pass	Himachal Pradesh	14,931 ft (4,551 m)	Lahaul & Spiti
Karakoram Pass	Ladakh	18,176 ft (5,540 m)	Ladakh & Xinjiang
Lipulekh Pass	Uttarakhand	17,500 ft (5,300 m)	
Lungalacha La	Ladakh	16,600 ft (5,100 m)	
Lamkhaga Pass	Himachal Pradesh	17,336 ft (5,284 m)	
Marsimik La	Ladakh	18,314 ft (5,582 m)	
Mana Pass	Uttarakhand	18,192 ft (5,545 m)	
Namika La	Ladakh	12,139 ft (3,700 m)	
Nama Pass	Uttarakhand	17,100 ft (5,200 m)	
(Nanda Devi Biosphere Reserve)	Uttarakhand	17,100 ft (5,200 m)	
Nathu La	Sikkim	14,140 ft (4,310 m)	Sikkim & Tibet
Palakkad Gap	Kerala	961 ft (293 m)	Kerala & Tamil Nadu
Thamarassery	Kerala	1,700 ft (520 m)	Malabar & Mysore
Sengottai	Kerala	729 ft (222 m)	Travancore & Tamil Nadu
Pensi La	Ladakh	17,424 ft (5,311 m)	
Rezang La	Ladakh	16,000 ft (4,900 m)	
Rohtang Pass	Himachal Pradesh	13,051 ft (3,978 m)	Manali & Lahaul
Sadhna Pass	Jammu and Kashmir (Jammu, Kashmir)	11,100 ft (3,400 m)	Jammu & Kashmir
Sasser Pass	Ladakh	17,753 ft (5,411 m)	Nubra & Siachen Glacier
Sela Pass	Arunachal Pradesh	14,000 ft (4,300 m)	
Shipki La	Himachal Pradesh	12,900 ft (3,900 m)	
Sia La	Jammu and Kashmir (Siachen Glacier)	18,337 ft (5,589 m)	
Shingo La	Ladakh	18,225 ft (5,555 m)	
Spangur Gap	Ladakh	17,132 ft (5,222 m)	
Gyong La	Jammu and Kashmir (Siachen Glacier)	18,655 ft (5,686 m)	
Bilafond La	Jammu and Kashmir (Siachen Glacier)	17,881 ft (5,450 m)	
Sin La	Uttarakhand	18,028 ft (5,495 m)	
Tanglang La	Ladakh	17,583 ft (5,359 m)	
Traill's Pass	Uttarakhand	17,100 ft (5,200 m)	
Zojila Pass	Jammu and Kashmir (Kashmir) and Ladakh	12,400 ft (3,800 m)	Kashmir & Ladakh
Muling la	Uttarakhand	18,599 ft (5,669 m)	Uttrakhand and Tibet

=== Indonesia ===
- Puncak Pass, West Java

=== Japan ===
- Usui Pass between Nagano and Gunma Prefectures

=== Kyrgyzstan ===
See: List of mountain passes in Kyrgyzstan

=== Lebanon ===
- Dahr al-Baydar

=== Malaysia ===
- Genting Sempah on the border of Pahang and Selangor

=== Nepal ===
- Thorong La 5416 m. Annapurna Circuit Region
- West col 6135 m. Makalu Barun
- East Col 6100 m. Makalu Barun
- Sherpani Col Makalu Barun
- Cho La 5420 m. Mount EverestRegion
- Larkya La Pass 5106 m. Manaslu
- Kagmara La 5115 m. Southern Dolpo
- Ganja La 5106 m. Langtang Helambu Region
- Meso Kanta 5089 m. Annapurna Region
- Kang la Pass 5320 m. (Annapurna manang region )
- Khongma La Pass 5535m (Everest Khumbu Region)
- Renjo La Pass 5360m (Everest Khumbu Region)

=== Pakistan ===
- Babusar pass
- Badgoi Pass
- Bolan Pass
- Broghol Pass to Afghanistan
- Chaprot Pass
- Dorah Pass to Afghanistan
- Gondogoro Pass
- Gumal Pass
- Hayal Pass
- Hispar Pass
- Karakar Pass
- Khunjerab Pass to China
- Khyber Pass to Afghanistan
- Kilik Pass to China
- Kohat Pass
- Lowari Pass
- Malakand Pass
- Mintaka Pass to China
- Naltar Pass
- Shandur Top
- Tochi Pass Connects Ghazni to Bannu

=== South Korea ===
Name	Height (m)	Between/Separating	Note
Mungyeong Saejae	642	Goesan/Mungyeong	footpath only
Ihwaryeong / Ewharyeong	548	Goesan/Mungyeong	bypass of Saejae
Juknyeong	696	Danyang/Yeongju	
Chupungnyeong	200	Gimcheon/Yeongdong	
Daegwallyeong	832	Gangneung/Pyeongchang	
Misiryeong	826	Goseong/Inje	
Hangyeryeong	1004	Inje/Yangyang	
Chinbu-ryong / Jinburyeong	520	Goseong/Inje	
Unduryeong	1089	Pyeongchang/Jeongseon	
Bihaeng-gijae	503	Pyeongchang/Jeongseon	
Bugaksan pathway - Bugak Skyway–Inwang Skyway	345	Seoul	footpath only
Namtaeryeong	183	Seoul/Gwacheon	
Jijidae Pass	116	Uiwang/Suwon	Jijidae Derby

=== Tajikistan ===
- Ak-Baital Pass (4,655 m)
- Anzob Pass (3,400 m)
- Beyik Pass to China (4,600 m)
- Kulma Pass to China (4,362 m)
- Kyzylart Pass to Kyrgyzstan (4,280 m)

=== Turkey ===
Name	Elevation in meter and feet	Province	Geographical region
Bahçe Pass	Just below 1,000 m	Osmaniye	Mediterranean Region
Belkahve Pass	268 m (879 ft)	İzmir	Aegean Region
Belen Pass	660 m (2,170 ft)	Hatay	Mediterranean Region
Çaykavak Pass	1,584 m (5,197 ft)	Niğde	Central Anatolia Region
Gülek Pass	1,050 m (3,440 ft)	Mersin	Mediterranean Region
Güresentepe Pass	2,180 m (7,150 ft)	Niğde-Aksaray	Central Anatolia Region
Karboğazı		Mersin	Mediterranean Region
Kızıldağ Pass	2,190 m (7,190 ft)	Erzincan - Sivas	Eastern Anatolia region - Central Anatolia Region
Kolsuz Pass	1,490 m (4,890 ft)	Niğde	Central Anatolia Region
Kop Pass	2,409 m (7,904 ft)	Bayburt	Eastern Anatolia region
Sertavul Pass	1,650 m (5,410 ft)	Mersin - Karaman	Mediterranean Region - Central Anatolia Region
Zigana Pass	2,032 m (6,667 ft)	Gümüşhane	Black Sea Region

=== Uzbekistan ===
- Kamchik Pass

== Australasia ==
=== Australia ===
- Alpine Way, New South Wales
- Macquarie Pass, New South Wales
- Kings Highway (Australia), New South Wales
- Cunninghams Gap, Queensland
- Heavitree Gap, Northern Territory
- Horrocks Pass, South Australia
- Nowlands Gap, New South Wales
- Pichi Richi Pass, South Australia
- Tawonga Gap, Victoria

=== New Zealand ===
Name	Island	Height(m)
Arthur's Pass	South Island	920
Burke's Pass	South Island	703
Copland Pass	South Island	2,150
Crown Saddle	South Island	1,076 (Highest alpine pass (sealed))
Dansey's Pass	South Island	935
Dashwood Pass	South Island	163
Desert Road	North Island	1,074
Dyers Pass	South Island	c.330
Evans Pass	South Island	c.200
Gebbies Pass	South Island	150
Haast Pass	South Island	562
Hilltop	South Island	555
Hope Saddle	South Island	634
Island Saddle	South Island	1,347 (Highest alpine pass (gravel))
Jollie's Pass (Canterbury)	South Island	N/A
Jollies Pass (Southland)	South Island	N/A
Lewis Pass	South Island	840
Lindis Pass	South Island	971
McKinnon Pass	South Island	1,140
Mamaku Saddle	North Island	N/A
Manawatū Gorge	North Island	N/A
Ohakukura Saddle	North Island	N/A
Porters Pass	South Island	946
Rai Saddle	South Island	247
Rahu Saddle	South Island	680
Redwood Pass	South Island	N/A
Rimutaka Saddle	North Island	555
Tākaka Hill Saddle	South Island	791
Taupeupe Saddle	North Island	N/A
The Divide	South Island	632
Waitaanga Saddle	North Island	N/A
Waituhi Saddle	North Island	N/A
Wards Pass	South Island	1,145
Weka Pass	South Island	N/A
Weld Pass	South Island	196
Wilmot Pass	South Island	671

== Europe ==
=== Alps ===
- Col de l'Argentière – France/Italy
- Albula Pass - Switzerland
- Arlberg Pass – Austria
- Bernina Pass – Switzerland
- Bielerhöhe Pass – Austria
- Bocchetta del Croso – Italy
- Bocchetto Sessera – Italy
- Col de la Bonette – France
- Brenner Pass – Austria/Italy
- Colle di Cadibona – Italy
- Colle della Croce – France/Italy
- Falzarego Pass – Italy
- Fern Pass – Austria
- Col Ferret – Italy/Switzerland
- Flexen Pass – Austria
- Flüela Pass – Switzerland
- Col du Fréjus – Italy/France
- Furka Pass – Switzerland
- Col du Galibier – France
- Passo Garlenda – Italy
- Gemmi Pass – Switzerland
- Grimsel Pass – Switzerland
- Giau Pass – Italy
- Grossglockner High Alpine Road
- Hiaslegg (Tragöß-Oberort – Trofaiach)
- Col de l'Iseran (elevation 2770 m) – highest paved mountain pass in the Alps
- Col de la Joux Verte – France
- Julier Pass – Switzerland
- Klausen Pass
- Krumbach Saddle
- Loibl Pass (Ljubelj Pass) – Austria/Slovenia
- Maloja Pass
- Nufenen Pass
- Oberalp Pass
- Petit Col Ferret – Italy/Switzerland
- Plöcken Pass (Passo di Monte Croce Carnico) Austria/Italy
- Pordoi Pass – Italy
- Pötschen Pass
- Predil Pass (Predel Pass) – Italy/Slovenia
- Pyhrn Pass
- Colle del Quazzo – Italy
- Col de Restefond
- Colle della Rho (Col de la Roue) – Italy/France
- Col Saint Martin
- San Bernardino Pass
- Colle San Bernardo
- San Boldo Pass
- Schober Pass – Austria
- Colle Scravaion – Italy
- Colle delle Selle Vecchie – Italy/France
- Semmering Pass
- Septimer Pass
- Colle Sestriere
- Colle dei Signori – Italy/France
- Simplon Pass
- Soboth (Soboški prelaz) – Austria
- Splügen Pass
- Great St Bernard Pass
- Little St Bernard Pass
- St. Gotthard Pass - Switzerland
- Stelvio Pass (Stilfserjoch)
- Susten Pass
- Packsattel – Austria
- Radl Pass (Radeljski prelaz) – Austria/Slovenia
- Passo della Teglia – Italy
- Col de Tende – France/Italy
- Giogo di Toirano – Italy
- Tremalzo Pass
- Umbrail Pass
- Wurzen Pass
- Vršič Pass – Slovenia

=== Apennines ===
* Bocca Trabaria pass
- Bocca Serriola pass
- Bocchetta Pass
- Calla pass
- Colle di Cadibona
- Capannelle Pass
- Cisa Pass
- Passo del Faiallo
- Futa Pass
- Giovi Pass
- Mandrioli pass
- Montecoronaro pass
- Muraglione pass
- Passo della Limina
- Pescara Pass
- Valico di San Fermo
- Scheggia Pass
- Passo del Turchino
- Viamaggio pass
- Raticosa pass

=== Carpathians ===
Name	Location	Height(m)
Besník	Slovakia	
Brestová	Slovakia	
Buzău Pass	Romania	642
Čertovica	Slovakia	1,232
Donovaly	Slovakia	960
Dukla Pass	Poland, Slovakia	502
Pezinska Baba	Slovakia	
Predeal Pass	Romania	1,000+
Prislop Pass	Romania	1,416
Soroška	Slovakia	
Surduc Pass	Romania	
Šturec	Slovakia	
Tihuța Pass	Romania	1,201
Timiș-Cerna Gap	Romania	
Transalpina Pass	Romania	2,142
Transfăgărășan Pass	Romania	2,035
Turnu Rosu Pass	Romania	352
Uzhok Pass	Ukraine	
Verecke Pass	Ukraine	
Vernár	Slovakia	765
Volovets Pass	Ukraine	1,014
Vulcan Pass	Romania	

=== Georgia ===
- Abano Pass
- Datvisjvari Pass
- Jvari Pass
- Mamison Pass
- Rikoti Pass
- Roki Tunnel
- Zekari Pass

=== Greece ===
- Baros Pass
- Katara Pass
- Thermopylae

=== Iceland ===
- Fimmvörðuháls

=== Ireland ===
- Barnesmore Gap
- Conor Pass
- Gap of Dunloe
- Healy Pass
- Mamore Gap
- Moll's Gap
- Wicklow Gap

=== Jura Mountains ===
- Col de l'Aiguillon
- Balmberg Pass
- Benkerjoch
- Bözberg Pass
- Breitehöchi Pass
- Bürersteig Pass
- Chall Pass
- Challhöchi Pass
- Col du Chasseral
- Chilchzimmersattel
- Col de la Croix
- Eichhöhe Pass
- Col des Étroits
- Col de la Givrine
- Col du Marchairuz
- Col du Mollendruz
- Mont Crosin
- Col du Mont d'Orzeires
- Col de Montvoie
- Oberer Hauenstein
- Passwang
- Col de Pierre Pertuis
- Les Pontins
- Col des Rangiers
- Col des Roches
- Salhöhe
- Santelhöchi
- Schafmatt
- Schelten Pass
- Staffelegg
- La Tourne
- Unterer Hauenstein
- Vue des Alpes
- Weissenstein Pass
- Col du Chat

=== Montenegro ===
- Durmitor Pass
- Lovcen Pass

=== Norway ===
- Dovrefjell (road E6)(1026 m)
- Filefjell (road E16)(1004 m)
- Gaularfjellet (road 13)(745 m)
- Geirangervegen (road 63)(1038 m)
- Hardangervidda (road 7)(1250 m)
- Haukelifjell (road E134)(1085 m)
- Hemsedalsfjellet (road 52)(1137 m)
- Hol-Aurland (county road 50)(1165 m)
- Ørnevegen (road 63)(624 m)
- Saltfjellet (European route E6)(689 m)
- Sognefjell (road 55)(1434 m)
- Strynefjell (road 15)(943 m) (or road 258)(1139 m)
- Suleskarvegen (county road 450)(1050 m)
- Trollstigen (road 63)(850 m)
- Valdresflye (road 51)(1390 m)
- Venabygdsfjellet (road 27)
- Vikafjell (road 13)(988 m)

=== Norway/Sweden ===
- Bjørnfjell/Riksgränsen (road E10) (530 m)
- Funäsdalen–Ljungdalen (road Z531) (975 m)
- Funäsdalen–Røros (road 84/31) (840 m)
- Gäddede–Klimpfjäll (road AC1067) (876 m)
- Graddis (Arjeplog–Rognan) (road 95/77) (740 m)
- Sälen (road 66) (760 m)
- Storlien (road E14) (615 m)
- Tännäs (road 311) (850 m)
- Umbukta (road E12) (600 m in tunnel, 650 m along older pass road)

=== Portugal ===
- Torre

=== Pyrenees ===
- Col d'Ares
- Col d'Aspin
- Col d'Aubisque
- Pas de la Casa
- Port de Larrau
- Port de Pailhères
- Col du Perthus
- El Portalet
- Portbou / Cerbère (more distinct: Coll dels Balitres)
- Col de Puymorens
- Col de la Quillane
- La Brèche de Roland
- Roncevaux Pass
- Somport
- Col du Tourmalet

=== Sierra Nevada (Spain) ===
- Puerto del Suspiro del Moro (Pass of the Moor's Sigh)

=== Great Britain ===
See:

- Mountain passes of England

- List of hill passes of the Lake District

- Mountain passes of Scotland
- Mountain passes of Wales

== North America ==
=== Alaska ===
- Anderson Pass – Alaska Range
- Kahiltna Pass – Alaska Range
- Mentasta Pass – Alaska Range
- Polychrome Pass – Alaska Range
- Chilkat Pass – Boundary Range
- Chilkoot Pass – Boundary Range
- White Pass – Boundary Range
- Atigun Pass – Brooks Range
- Crow Pass – Chugach Range
- Powerline Pass – Chugach Range
- Thompson Pass – Chugach Range
- Portage Pass – Chugach Range
- Johnson Pass – Kenai Range
- Moose Pass – Kenai Range
- Resurrection Pass – Kenai Range
- Turnagain Pass – Kenai Range
- Hatcher Pass – Talkeetna Range

=== Appalachian Mountains ===
- Appalachian Gap – Vermont
- Ashby Gap – Virginia
- Balsam Gap – North Carolina
- Brock Gap – Alabama
- Brocks Gap – Virginia
- Buck Creek Gap – North Carolina
- Buford's Gap – Virginia
- Bull Gap – North Carolina
- Carmans Notch – New York
- Chester Gap – Virginia
- Clarke's Gap – Virginia
- Cowee Gap – North Carolina
- Craven Gap – North Carolina
- Crawford Notch – New Hampshire
- Cumberland Gap – Virginia, Tennessee, Kentucky
- Cumberland Narrows – Maryland
- Deals Gap – North Carolina, Tennessee
- Deep Notch – New York
- Delaware Water Gap – Pennsylvania, New Jersey
- Diamond Notch – New York
- Dixville Notch – New Hampshire
- Evans Notch – Maine
- Fishers Gap – Virginia
- Franconia Notch – New Hampshire
- Gillespie Gap – North Carolina
- Goshen Pass – Virginia
- Grafton Notch – Maine
- Grandmother Gap – North Carolina
- Granville Notch – Vermont
- Hazen's Notch – Vermont
- Hillsboro Gap – Virginia
- Hobart Gap – New Jersey
- James River Gorge – Virginia
- Jarman Gap – Virginia
- Kancamagus Pass – New Hampshire
- Keyes Gap – Virginia, West Virginia
- Kinsman Notch – New Hampshire
- Lehigh Gap – Pennsylvania
- Lincoln Gap – Vermont
- Mahoosuc Notch – Maine
- Manassas Gap – Virginia
- Mechanicsburg Gap – West Virginia
- Middlebury Gap – Vermont
- Moccasin Gap – Virginia
- Monterey Pass – Pennsylvania
- New Market Gap – Virginia
- Newfound Gap – Tennessee, North Carolina
- Pinkham Notch – New Hampshire
- Potomac Water Gap – Maryland, Virginia, West Virginia
- Pound Gap – Kentucky, Virginia
- Rockfish Gap – Virginia
- Schuylkill Gap – Pennsylvania
- Sherburne Pass – Vermont
- Skinners Gap – West Virginia
- Smugglers Notch – Vermont
- Snickers Gap – Virginia
- Soco Gap – North Carolina
- Stony Clove Notch – New York
- Swannanoa Gap – North Carolina
- Swatara Gap – Pennsylvania
- Swift Run Gap – Virginia
- Thornton Gap – Virginia
- Thoroughfare Gap – Virginia
- Wilson Gap – Virginia, West Virginia
- Zealand Notch – New Hampshire

=== California Coast Ranges ===
- Pacheco Pass – Central California
- Altamont Pass – Northern Central California, in the Diablo Range

=== Cascade Range ===
- Allison Pass – British Columbia
- Austin Pass – Washington
- Blewett Pass (formerly known as Swauk Pass) – Washington
- Blizzard Gap – Oregon
- Bly Mountain Pass – Oregon
- Cady Pass – Washington
- Canyon Creek Pass – Oregon
- Cascade Pass – Washington
- Cayuse Pass – Washington
- Chinook Pass – Washington
- Colockum Pass – Washington
- Coquihalla Pass – British Columbia
- Cowhead Pass – British Columbia
- Crater Summit – Oregon
- Deer Creek Summit – Washington
- Disautel Summit – Washington
- Drews Gap – Oregon
- Elk Pass – Washington
- Green Pass – Washington
- Greensprings Summit
- Hayden Mountain Summit – Oregon
- Hogback Summit – Oregon
- Horse Ridge Summit – Oregon
- Lake of the Woods Summit
- Lolo Pass – Oregon
- Loup Loup Summit – Washington
- McKenzie Pass – Oregon
- Naches Pass – Washington
- Old Blewett Pass – Washington
- Pass Creek Pass – Washington
- Picture Rock Pass – Oregon
- Rainy Pass – Washington
- Rattlesnake Pass – Washington
- Santiam Pass- Oregon
- Satus Pass – Washington
- Sexton Mountain Pass – Oregon
- Sherman Pass – Washington
- Smith Hill Summit – Oregon
- Snoqualmie Pass – Washington
- Stage Road Pass – Oregon
- Stampede Pass – Washington
- Stevens Pass – Washington
- Sunday Summit – British Columbia
- Sun Pass – Oregon
- Washington and Rainy Passes (see North Cascades Highway) – Washington
- Wauconda Pass – Washington
- White Pass – Washington
- Willamette Pass – Oregon
- Windy Pass – Washington

=== Coast Mountains ===
- Ash Pass – British Columbia
- Athelney Pass – British Columbia (Pacific Ranges)
- Cayoosh Pass – British Columbia (Lillooet Ranges/Cayoosh Range)
- Chilkat Pass – British Columbia
- Chilkoot Pass – Alaska, British Columbia
- Deception Pass – British Columbia (Coast Mountains/Rainbow Range)
- Elbow Pass – British Columbia (Chilcotin Ranges)
- Gnat Pass – British Columbia
- Griswold Pass – British Columbia (Chilcotin Ranges)
- Grizzly Pass – British Columbia (Pacific Ranges/Chilcotin Ranges)
- Heckman Pass – British Columbia (technically in the Rainbow Range, which is not Coast Mountains but Chilcotin Plateau)
- Iron Pass – British Columbia (Chilcotin Ranges)
- Lindquist Pass – British Columbia (Kitimat Ranges)
- Lord Pass – British Columbia (Pacific Ranges)
- McCuish Pass – British Columbia (Kitimat Ranges)
- McGillivray Pass – British Columbia (Bendor Range/Cadwallader Range)
- Mission Pass – British Columbia (Pacific Ranges)
- Pemberton Pass – British Columbia (Pacific Ranges/Lillooet Ranges)
- Railroad Pass (aka Railway Pass) – British Columbia (Pacific Ranges)
- Singing Pass – British Columbia (Garibaldi Ranges)
- Raindoor Pass – British Columbia (Garibaldi Ranges)
- Surel Pass – British Columbia (Kitimat Ranges)
- Ring Pass – British Columbia (Pacific Ranges)
- Taylor Pass – British Columbia (Chilcotin Ranges)
- Tyoax Pass – British Columbia (Chilcotin Ranges)
- Warner Pass – British Columbia (Chilcotin Ranges)
- Wedge Pass – British Columbia (Garibaldi Ranges)
- White Pass – Alaska, British Columbia
- Wolverine Pass – British Columbia (Chilcotin Ranges)
- Wolverine Pass – British Columbia (Garibaldi Ranges)

=== Hazelton Mountains ===
- Atna Pass

=== Interior Plateau ===
- Clapperton Creek Summit – British Columbia
- Festuca Pass – British Columbia
- Pennask Summit – British Columbia

=== Mackenzie Mountains ===
- Macmillan Pass – Yukon, Northwest Territories
- Howard's Pass – Yukon, Northwest Territories

=== Monashee Mountains ===
- Bonanza Pass – British Columbia
- Canoe Pass – British Columbia
- Eagle Pass – British Columbia
- Joss Pass, British Columbia
- Monashee Pass – British Columbia
- Pettipiece Pass – British Columbia
- Sherman Pass – Washington

=== Rocky Mountains ===
- Abbot Pass, Alberta and British Columbia
- Arapaho Pass, Front Range, Colorado
- Arapaho Pass, Rabbit Ears Range, Colorado
- Argentine Pass, Colorado
- Athabasca Pass, Alberta and British Columbia
- Badger Pass, Montana
- Bald Mountain Pass, Utah
- Banner Summit, Idaho
- Bannock Pass, Idaho and Montana
- Beartooth Pass, Wyoming
- Beaver Pass, British Columbia
- Berthoud Pass, Colorado
- Big Hole Pass, Montana
- Big Mountain Pass, Utah
- Black Bear Pass, Colorado
- Boreas Pass, Colorado
- Boulder-Grand Pass, Colorado
- Bozeman Pass, Montana
- Bridger Pass, Wyoming
- Buchanan Pass, Colorado
- Buffalo Pass, Colorado
- Bush Pass, Alberta and British Columbia
- Cameron Pass, Colorado
- Carcajou Pass, Alberta and British Columbia
- Cerro Summit, Colorado
- Chief Joseph Pass, Idaho and Montana
- Coal Bank Pass, Colorado
- Cochetopa Pass, Colorado
- Cordova Pass, Colorado
- Cottonwood Pass, Colorado
- Craig Pass, Wyoming
- Crowsnest Pass, Alberta and British Columbia
- Cucharas Pass, Colorado
- Cumbres Pass, Colorado
- Currant Creek Pass, Colorado
- Dallas Divide, Colorado
- Dead Indian Pass, Wyoming
- Douglas Pass, Colorado
- Dunraven Pass, Wyoming
- Elbow Pass, Alberta
- Elk Pass, Alberta and British Columbia
- Fall River Pass, Colorado
- Fourth of July Summit, Idaho
- Fraser Pass, British Columbia
- Fremont Pass, Colorado
- Galena Summit, Idaho
- Georgia Pass, Colorado
- Geyser Pass, Utah
- Gibbons Pass, Montana
- Glorieta Pass, New Mexico
- Gore Pass, Colorado
- Grand Mesa Summit, Colorado
- Granite Pass, Wyoming
- Guanella Pass, Colorado
- Hagerman Pass, Colorado
- Halfmoon Pass, Colorado
- Hancock Pass, Colorado
- Hardscrabble Pass, Colorado
- Highwood Pass, Alberta
- Homestake Pass, Montana
- Hoosier Pass, Colorado
- Howse Pass, Alberta and British Columbia
- Imogene Pass, Colorado
- Independence Pass, Colorado
- Jarvis Pass, British Columbia
- Jones Pass, Colorado
- Kakwa Pass, British Columbia
- Kebler Pass, Colorado
- Kenosha Pass, Colorado
- Kicking Horse Pass, Alberta and British Columbia
- Kingman Pass, Wyoming
- Kings Hill Pass, Montana
- Kokomo Pass, Colorado
- La Manga Pass, Colorado
- La Poudre Pass, Colorado
- La Veta Pass, Colorado
- Lake Pass, Colorado
- Lemhi Pass, Idaho and Montana
- Lewis and Clark Pass, Montana
- Lizard Head Pass, Colorado
- Logan Pass, Montana
- Lolo Pass, Idaho and Montana
- Lookout Pass, Idaho and Montana
- Lost Trail Pass, Idaho and Montana
- Loveland Pass, Colorado
- MacDonald Pass, Montana
- Marias Pass, Montana
- Marshall Pass, Colorado
- McClure Pass, Colorado
- McGregor Pass, British Columbia
- Milner Pass, Colorado
- Molas Pass, Colorado
- Monarch Pass, Colorado
- Monida Pass, Idaho and Montana
- Monkman Pass, British Columbia
- Monument Hill, Colorado
- Mores Creek Summit, Idaho
- Mosca Pass, Colorado
- Mosquito Pass, Colorado
- Muddy Pass, Colorado
- Mullan Pass, Montana
- Muncho Pass, British Columbia
- Nez Perce Pass, Idaho and Montana
- North La Veta Pass, Colorado
- North Pass, Colorado
- Ohio Pass, Colorado
- Old Monarch Pass, Colorado
- Old Rabbit Ears Pass, Colorado
- Original Monarch Pass, Colorado
- Palliser Pass, Alberta and British Columbia
- Palmer Saddle, Colorado
- Pawnee Pass, Colorado
- Phillips Pass, Alberta and British Columbia
- Pine Pass, British Columbia
- Piper Pass, Alberta
- Pipestone Pass, Montana
- Poncha Pass, Colorado
- Powder River Pass, Wyoming
- Ptarmigan Pass, Front Range, Colorado
- Ptarmigan Pass, Sawatch Range, Colorado
- Rabbit Ears Pass, Colorado
- Raton Pass, Colorado and New Mexico
- Raynolds Pass, Idaho and Montana
- Red Hill Pass, Colorado
- Red Mountain Pass, Colorado
- Red Rock Pass, Idaho
- Rogers Pass, Colorado
- Rogers Pass, Montana
- Rollins Pass, Colorado
- Sangre de Cristo Pass, Colorado
- Schofield Pass, Colorado
- Searle Pass, Colorado
- Shrine Pass, Colorado
- Sifton Pass, British Columbia
- Simpson Pass, Alberta and British Columbia
- Sinclair Pass, British Columbia
- Slumgullion Summit, Colorado
- Smuts Pass, Alberta
- Soldier Summit, Utah
- South Pass, Wyoming
- Spring Creek Pass, Colorado
- Spring Valley Summit, Idaho
- Stone Man Pass, Colorado
- Stony Pass, Colorado
- Summit Pass, British Columbia
- Sunset Pass, Alberta
- Sunwapta Pass, Alberta
- Sylvan Pass, Wyoming
- Targhee Pass, Idaho and Montana
- Tennessee Pass, Colorado
- Teton Pass, Wyoming
- Thompson Pass, Alberta and British Columbia
- Togwotee Pass, Wyoming
- Tonquin Pass, Alberta and British Columbia
- Trail Ridge High Point, Colorado
- Trout Creek Pass, Colorado
- Two Ocean Pass, Wyoming
- Unaweep Divide, Colorado
- Ute Pass, Colorado
- Vail Pass, Colorado
- Vasquez Pass, Colorado
- Vermilion Pass, Alberta and British Columbia
- Wapiti Pass, British Columbia
- Webster Pass, Colorado
- White Bird Hill Summit, Idaho
- Wilkerson Pass, Colorado
- Willow Creek Pass, Colorado
- Willow Creek Pass, Montana
- Wind River Pass, Colorado
- Windy Pass, Colorado
- Wolf Creek Pass, Colorado
- Wolverine Pass, British Columbia
- Yellowhead Pass, Alberta and British Columbia
- Yellowjacket Pass, Colorado

=== Selkirk Mountains ===
- Argonaut Pass – British Columbia
- Asulkan Pass – British Columbia
- Rogers Pass – British Columbia
- Kootenay Pass – British Columbia
- Retallack Pass aka Zincton Pass – British Columbia

=== Sierra Nevada ===
- Barker Pass
- Baxter Pass
- Beckwourth Pass (lowest Sierra Nevada pass at 5,221 feet (1,591 m))
- Bishop Pass
- Carson Pass
- Devil's Gate Pass
- Donahue Pass
- Donner Pass (pass of the Donner Party and Lincoln Highway)
- Donner Summit (Euer Saddle, pass of Interstate 80)
- Ebbetts Pass
- Echo Summit (Johnson's Pass, pass of U.S. Route 50)
- Emigrant Gap
- Forester Pass
- Fredonyer Pass
- Glen Pass
- Henness Pass
- Kearsarge Pass
- Luther Pass
- Monitor Pass
- Mono Pass
- Muir Pass
- Roller Pass
- Sawmill Pass
- Sherman Pass
- Sonora Pass
- Tioga Pass (highest Sierra Nevada roadway pass at 9,943 feet (3,031 m))
- Trail Crest
- Walker Pass
- Yuba Pass

=== Stikine Ranges ===
- Aeroplane Pass
- Metsantan Pass
- Sifton Pass

=== Tehachapi Mountains ===
- Oak Creek Pass
- Tehachapi Pass
- Tejon Pass

=== Other ===
- Emory Pass – New Mexico, NM Highway 152 crosses this pass in the Black Range between the towns of Kingston (east side) and San Lorenzo (west side).
- Fremont Pass – Nevada, in the Lake Range, 8 mi. NE of Pyramid Lake
- Newhall Pass – California, separating the San Gabriel Mountains from the Santa Susana Mountains
- Pickle Gap – a mountain pass in Arkansas
- San Gorgonio Pass – California, separates Mount San Gorgonio and the Transverse Ranges from Mount San Jacinto and the Peninsular Ranges
- Tijeras Pass – New Mexico, main route through the Sandia and Manzano Mountains east of Albuquerque
- Polkorridoren, Peary Land, Greenland

== South America ==
=== Andes ===
==== Northern Andes ====
- Collado del Condor – Pico el Águila, Mérida (state)
- La Línea, Colombia (connects between Ibagué and Armenia)
- Papallacta Pass, Ecuador – 4,200 metres (13,766 feet)

==== Central Andes ====
- Abra de Porculla, Peru (connects between Olmos and Marañón) — 2,137 metres (7,011 ft), lowest pass in the Andes
- Ticlio, Peru — 4,818 metres (15,807 ft)
- Paso Chungará, Chile–Bolivia (on road 11 and 4, connects between Arica and La Paz) — 4,680 metres (15,350 ft)
- Paso Colchane – Pisigua, Chile–Bolivia (on road 15 and 12, connects between Iquique and Oruro) — 3,710 metres (12,170 ft)

==== Southern Andes ====
- Abra del Acay, Salta Province, Argentina (connects between La Poma and San Antonio de los Cobres) — 4,972 metres (16,312 ft) (3.09 miles high)
- Abra de Chorillos, Salta Province, Argentina (connects between San Antonio de los Cobres and Caucharí)
- Paso de Agua Negra, Chile–Argentina (connects between La Serena and San José de Jachal)
- Paso Cardenal Samoré (Formerly known as Puyehue), Chile–Argentina (connects between Osorno and San Carlos de Bariloche) — 1,314 metres (4,311 ft)
- Paso Carirriñe, Chile–Argentina (connects between Panguipulli and Junín de los Andes) — 1,176 metres (3,858 ft)
- Paso Derecho, Chile–Argentina (connects between Los Ángeles and Zapala)
- Paso Futalefú, Chile–Argentina (connects between Chaitén and Esquel)
- Paso Huahum, Chile–Argentina (connects between Panguipulli and San Martín de los Andes) — 659 metres (2,162 ft)
- Paso de Ipela, Chile–Argentina (connects between Futrono and San Martín de los Andes) — ≈ 1,400 metres (4,600 ft)
- Paso de Jama, Chile–Argentina (connects between San Pedro de Atacama and Susques) — ≈ 4,200 metres (13,800 ft)
- Paso Libertadores, Chile–Argentina (connects between Santiago and Mendoza) — ≈ 3,200 metres (10,500 ft)
- Uspallata Pass, Chile–Argentina (connects between Santiago and Mendoza) — ≈ 3,810 metres (12,500 ft)
- Paso Mamuil Malal, Chile–Argentina (connects between Pucón and Junín de los Andes)
- Paso Pampa Alta (also known as Puesto Viejo), Chile–Argentina (connects between Coihaique and Alto Río Senguer) — 865 metres (2,838 ft)
- Paso Pehuenche, Chile–Argentina (connects between San Clemente and Bardas Blancas)
- Paso Pérez Rosales, Chile–Argentina (connects between Puerto Varas and San Carlos de Bariloche)
- Paso Pino Hachado, Chile–Argentina (connects between Temuco and Zapala) — 1,884 metres (6,181 ft)
- Paso Pircas Negras, Chile–Argentina (connects between Copiapó and Chilecito)
- Paso Río Encuentro, Chile–Argentina (connects between Palena and Tecka)
- Paso Roballo, Chile–Argentina (connects between Cochrane and Bajo Caracoles)
- Paso San Francisco, Chile–Argentina (connects between Copiapó and Fiambalá) — 4,748 metres (15,577 ft)
- Paso de Sico, Chile–Argentina (connects between Socaire and Catua) — 4,092 metres (13,425 ft)
- Chile Route 23 — 4,580 metres (15,030 ft)
- Chile Route 27 — 4,831 metres (15,850 ft)

=== Other ===
- Abra de la Ventana, Sierra de la Ventana, Buenos Aires Province, Argentina
- Contulmo Pass, Cordillera de Nahuelbuta, part of the larger Chilean Coast Range (connects between Contulmo and Purén)
- Serra do Rio do Rastro, Brazil

== See also ==
- List of highest paved roads in Europe
