= Boldo (disambiguation) =

Boldo is a species of tree endemic to Chile.

Boldo may also refer to:

== Places ==
- Boldo, Alabama, a US town
- El Boldo Airport, an airport in Chile
- San Boldo Pass, a mountain pass in Italy

== People ==
- Dionisio Boldo, 15th- and 16th-century Italian painter
- Sylvie Boldo, French computer scientist
