= Challhöchi =

Challhöchi stands for:

- Mountain between Metzerlen and Röschenz in Switzerland, see Chall Pass
- Mountain Pass between Eptingen and Hauenstein in Switzerland, see Challhöchi Pass
