= Le Grand Argentier =

Mountain in France

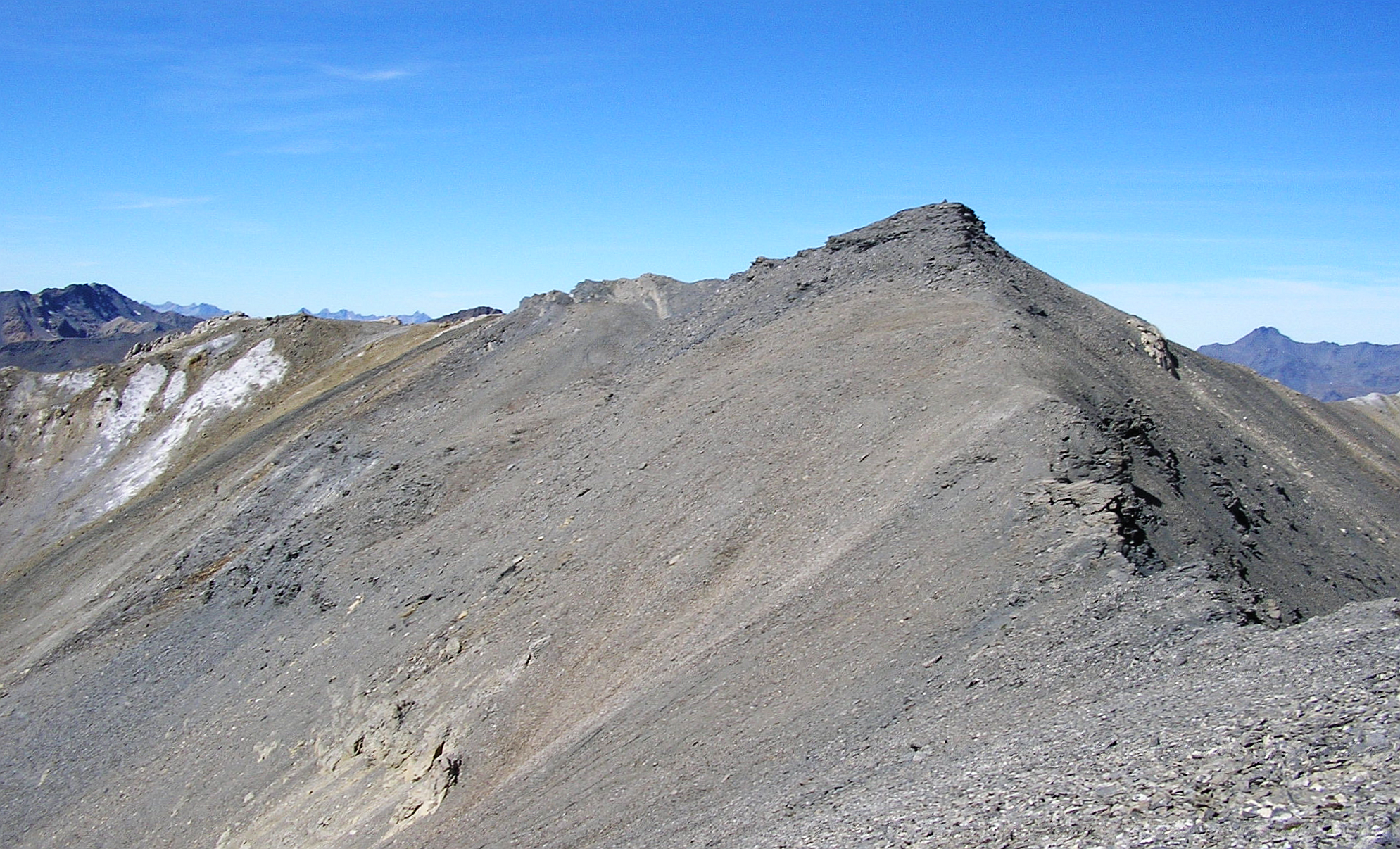

Highest point
- Elevation: 3,042 m (9,980 ft)
- Prominence: 46 m (151 ft)
- Parent peak: Punta Nera
- Coordinates: 45°07′33″N 6°39′16″E

Geography
- Location within Alps
- Location: Auvergne-Rhône-Alpes, France
- Parent range: Cottian Alps / Massif des Cerces

Geology
- Rock type(s): shists and dolomite

Climbing
- Easiest route: from Valfréjus (Modane)

Le Grand Argentier is a mountain of Savoie (France). It lies in the Cottian Alps range (or in the Massif des Cerces, according to French alpinistic literature) at an elevation of 3,042 metres (9,980 ft) above sea level.

== Geography ==
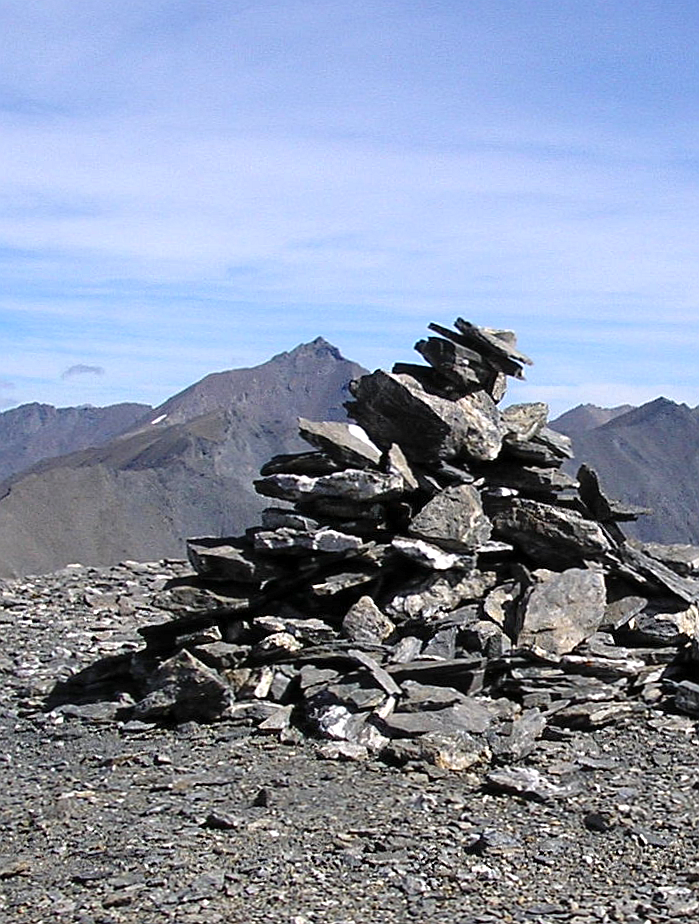
Summit cairn

The Grand Argentier is the main summit of a ridge dividing the valley of the Ruisseau du Frejus (NE) from the valley of the Torrent de Fontane Froide, both tributaries of the Ruisseau du Charmaix, which ends in the Arc downstream of Modane. Towards SE the mountain is connected with the neighbouring Punta Nera by a saddle at 2,996 m of elevation., while the water divide Fréjus/Fontaine Froide continues with the Col du Petit Argentier (2,599 m) and the Petit Argentier. The southern slopes of the Grand Argentier are mainly detrital, while its western face, flanking Fontaine Froide valley, is remarkable for a large dolomite escarpment. Its summit is marked by a cairn.

== Access to the summit ==
From its French side the Grand Argentier is usually accessed from Valfréjus (Modane), and is a much appreciated ski mountaineering destination. In wintertime some skilifts operating there can be used in order to shorten the climb. The normal route to access the mountain from its Italian side starts from Grange della Rho (Bardonecchia) and, after Piano dei Morti (at about 2,300 m), leaves the footpath leading to the Colle della Rho and reaches the summit through its South-Western slopes, at first grassy and then bare and rocky, reaching the Punta Nera and finally the Grand Argentier.

== Maps ==
- French official cartography (Institut Géographique National - IGN); on-line version: www.geoportail.fr

Media related to Le Grand Argentier at Wikimedia Commons
