= Pötschen Pass =

- Location within Alps
- Elevation: 993 m (3,258 ft)

Location
- Location: Austria
- Range: Alps
- Coordinates: 47°37′N 13°41′E

Pötschen Pass (el. 993 m.) is a high mountain pass in the Austrian Alps between the Bundesländer of Upper Austria and Styria.

== See also ==
- List of highest paved roads in Europe
- List of mountain passes
