= Col Saint Martin =

Mountain pass in the Alps in France

Col Martin
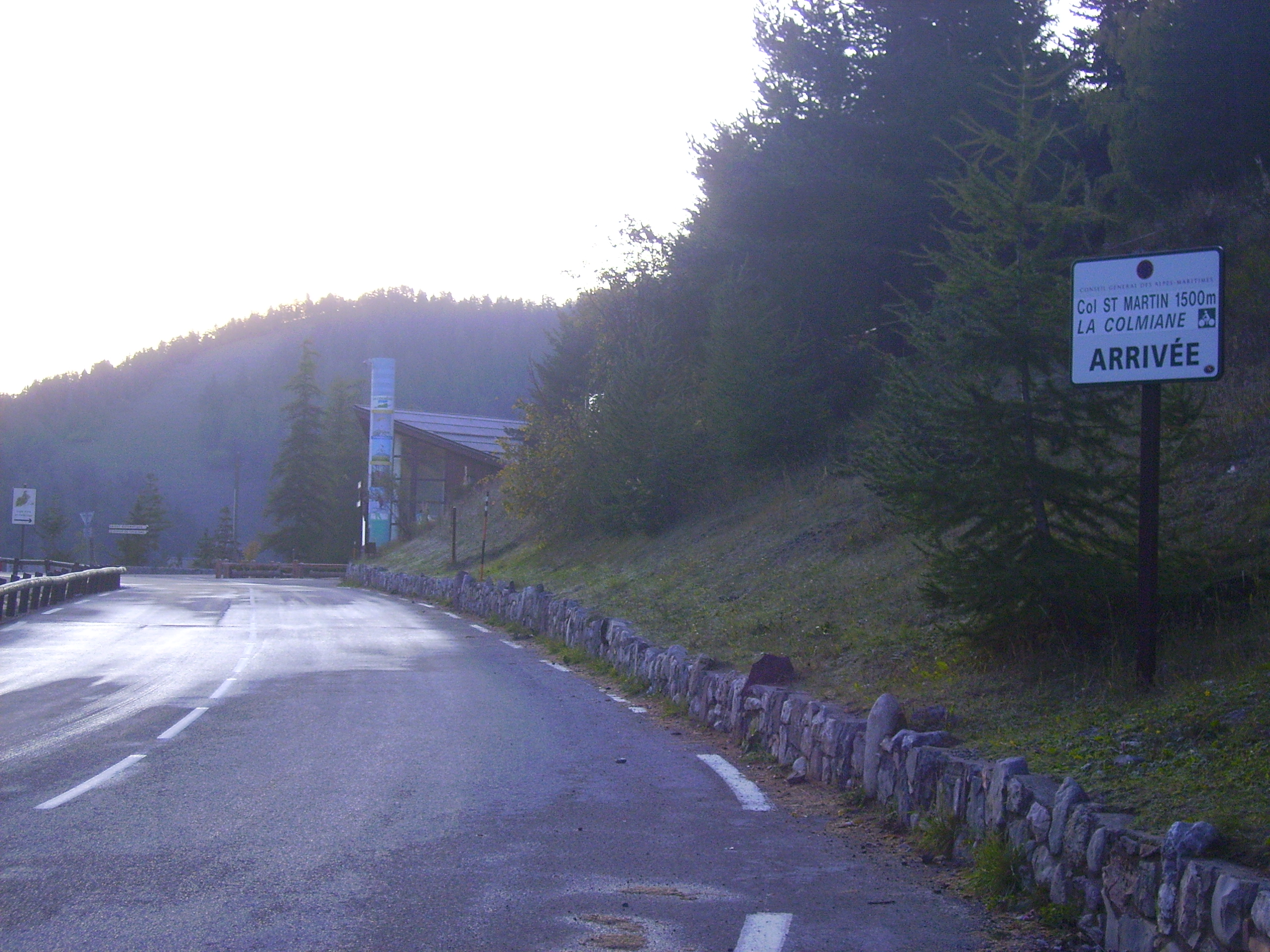
- Interactive map of Col Martin
- Elevation: 1,500 metres (4,900 ft)
- Traversed by: D 2205

Third Approach
- Location: Alpes-Maritimes, France
- Range: Alps
- Coordinates: 44°4′16″N 7°13′15″E

Col Saint Martin (el. 1500 m.) is a high mountain pass in the Alps in the department of Alpes-Maritimes in France.

It is traversed by the D-2205 highway.

The place has been crossed at the Tour de France road cycling race in 1973, 1975 and 2020, as well as at multiple editions of the Paris-Nice.

== See also ==
- List of highest paved roads in Europe
- List of mountain passes
