= Tremalzo Pass =

Passo di Tremalzo
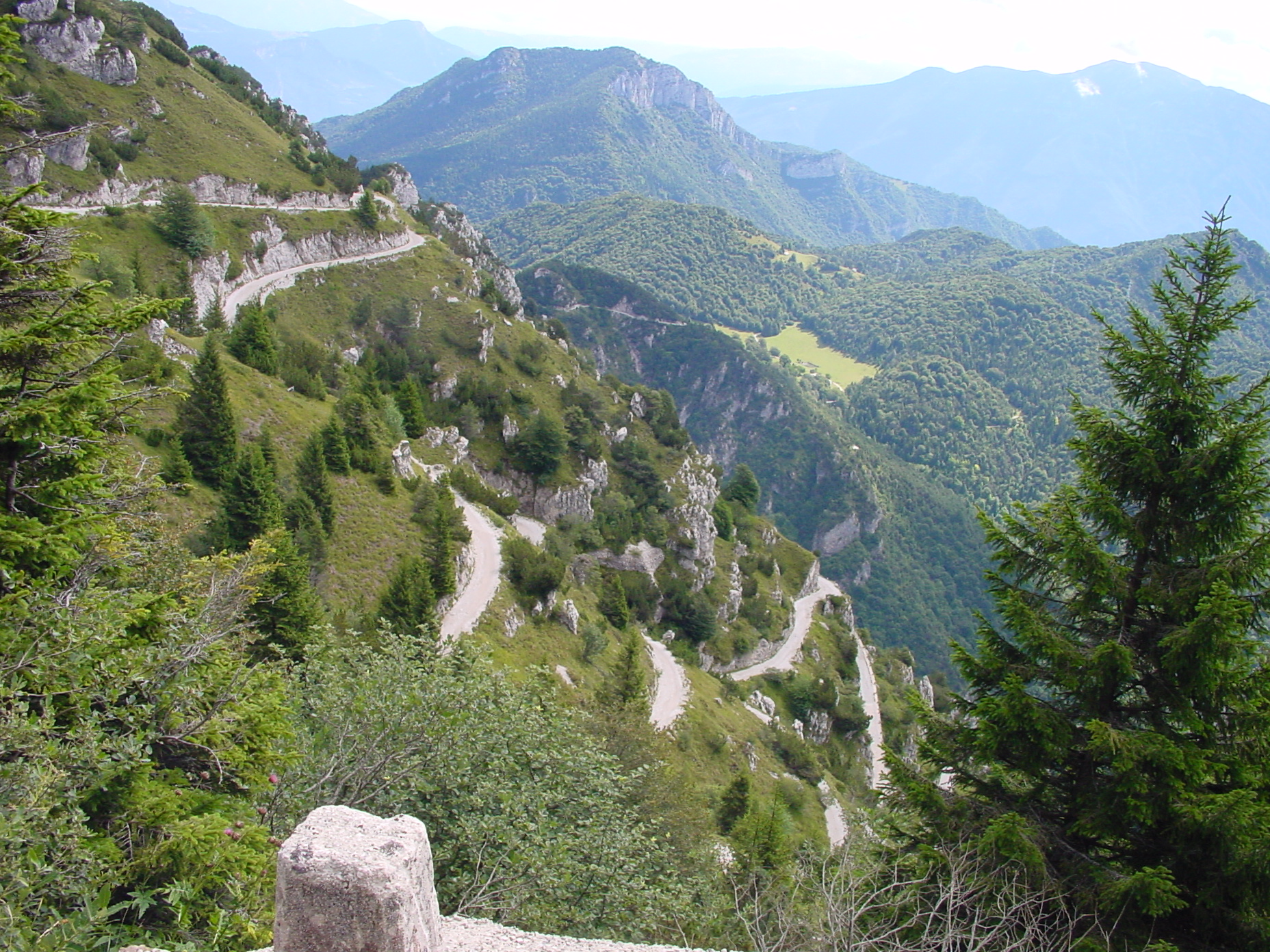
- Passo di Tremalzo.

- Location within Alps
- Elevation: 1,702 m (5,584 ft)

Location
- Location: Trentino, Italy
- Range: Garda Mountains
- Coordinates: 45°50′20″N 10°42′12″E

The Tremalzo Pass (Italian: Passo di Tremalzo) (el. 1702 m.) is a mountain pass in Trentino in Italy.

It lies near Trento and Lake Garda. The pass road was built for strategic reasons during World War I. The south side of the pass requires an all-terrain vehicle. Chains are required from September to May. The pass road has a maximum grade of 14%.

== See also ==
- List of highest paved roads in Europe
- List of mountain passes
