= Col de la Joux Verte =

Mountain path in French Alps

Coordinates: 46°11′59″N 6°45′34″E

- Interactive map of Col de la Joux Verte
- Elevation: 1,760 metres (5,770 ft)

Third Approach
- Location: France
- Range: Alps

Col de la Joux Verte (el. 1760 m.) is a high mountain pass in the Alps in France. Both roads to it come from the resort of Morzine, allowing a round trip to be made. The ski station of Morzine-Avoriaz is nearby, which hosted Tour de France stage finishes in 1975, 1977, 1983, 1985, 1979, 1994, and 2010.

== See also ==
- List of highest paved roads in Europe
- List of mountain passes
