= Carcajou Pass =

Mountain pass in Alberta, Canada

- Location within Alberta Location within British Columbia

Third Approach
- Location: Alberta and British Columbia, Canada
- Range: Canadian Rockies
- Coordinates: 53°13′49″N 119°16′55″W
- Topo map: NTS 83E3 Mount Robson

Carcajou Pass is a mountain pass on the Continental Divide and British Columbia–Alberta boundary at the north end of Mount Robson Provincial Park. On the Alberta side lies the northwestern part of Jasper National Park. Carcajou is the French word for "wolverine".

== See also ==
- List of mountain passes
