= Sifton Pass =

- Location within British Columbia
- Elevation: 1,012 m (3,320 ft)

Third Approach
- Location: British Columbia, Canada
- Coordinates: 57°56′00″N 126°11′00″W
- Topo map: NTS 94E16 Sifton Pass

Sifton Pass, 1,012 metres (3,320 feet), is a mountain pass in the Rocky Mountain Trench in the Northern Interior of British Columbia, Canada, forming the divide between the Fox and Kechika Rivers, and therefore between the drainage basins of the Finlay (the north fork of the Peace) and Liard Rivers. It also forms a division point between the Muskwa Ranges of the Northern Rockies to its east, and the Cassiar Mountains to its west.

It forms the prominence col for Thudaka Peak, many miles distant and the main height of land in the Interior Mountains between the Trench and the Boundary Ranges of the Coast Mountains. The resulting prominence for Thudaka is 1763 m, with the line parent for that peak being Mount Lloyd George, one of the highest in the Muskwa Ranges.

It was named for Clifford Sifton,

== See also ==
- List of mountain passes
