= Valico di San Fermo =

Mountain pass between province of Genoa and province of Alessandria in Italy

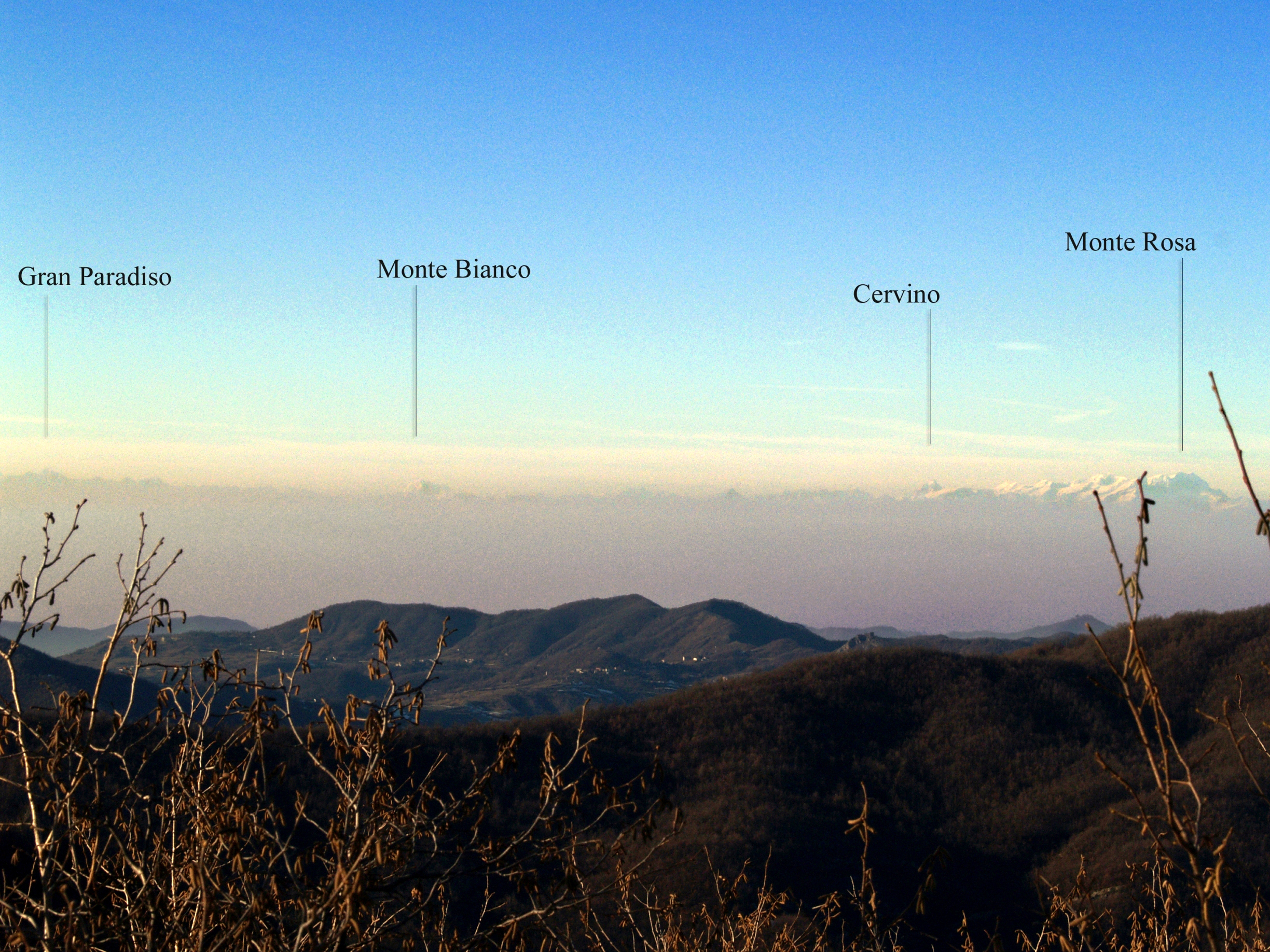
- Panorama from piedmontese side of valico di San Fermo

- Location within Alps
- Elevation: 1,129 m (3,704 ft)
- Traversed by: SP 81 di Vallenzona (ligurian side)

Third Approach
- Location: Alessandria/Genoa, Italy
- Range: Apennine
- Coordinates: 44°36′36″N 09°06′11″E

Valico di San Fermo also called Valico di San Clemente (1,129 m) is a mountain pass between province of Genoa and province of Alessandria in Italy.

It connects the Borbera and Vobbia valley, linking Cabella Ligure (Piedmont) and Vobbia (Liguria) in the south.

== See also ==
- List of highest paved roads in Europe
- List of mountain passes
