= Krumbach Saddle =

Coordinates: 47.8161°N 15.4392°E

Krumbach Saddle Krumbachsattel
- Interactive map of Krumbach Saddle; Krumbachsattel
- Elevation: 951 metres (3,120 ft)

Third Approach
- Location: Austria
- Range: Alps

The Krumbach Saddle (German: Krumbachsattel, 951 m [3,120 ft]) is a high mountain pass in the Austrian Alps in the state of Lower Austria.

== See also ==
- List of highest paved roads in Europe
- List of mountain passes
