= Skinners Gap =

Coordinates: 39.5528748°N 77.9941658°W

Skinners Gap (elevation: 650 feet [198 m]) is a mountain pass in the U.S. state of West Virginia.

Skinners Gap most likely was named after a local pioneer settler.
