= Çaykavak Pass =

Çaykavak is a mountain pass in Niğde Province, Turkey.

Çaykavak is situated on the northern slopes of Toros Mountains on the highway D.805 connecting Niğdeto the Mediterranean coast. It is 48 kilometres (30 mi) to Niğde and 5 kilometres (3.1 mi) to the D.750 highway, the main north to south highway in Central Turkey which D.805 merges to. The coordinates are 37°35′43″N 34°32′31″E and the elevation is 1,600 metres (5,200 ft).

While south of the pass is mountainous, the north composed of high plains except for the heights 6 kilometres (3.7 mi) away where the highway passes through Kolsuz Pass.
