= Windy Pass (Alpine Lakes) =

Mountain pass in Washington

- Interactive map of Windy Pass
- Elevation: 6,507 ft (1,983 m)
- Traversed by: Forest Service Trail 1554

Third Approach
- Location: Washington, United States
- Range: Cascades
- Coordinates: 47°33′7″N 120°52′28″W
- Topo map: TopoQuest

Windy Pass (el. 6507 ft.) is a mountain pass in the Cascade Mountains in Washington. It is in the Alpine Lakes Wilderness area.
