= Dionisio Boldo =

Italian painter

Dionisio Boldo (active 1604) was an Italian painter of the Baroque period, mainly active in Brescia. He trained with Giulio Clovio. He specialized in painting miniature watercolor paintings. He also worked as an architect for the church of San Petronio in Bologna.
