= Bly Mountain Pass =

Mountain pass in Oregon, United States

Coordinates: 42°21′15″N 121°23′46″W

- Interactive map of Bly Mountain Pass
- Elevation: 5,087 ft (1,551 m)
- Traversed by: OR 140

Third Approach
- Location: Klamath County, Oregon, United States
- Topo map: TopoQuest

Bly Mountain Pass (el. 5087 ft.) is a mountain pass in Oregon traversed by Oregon Route 140.
