= Pampa Alta Pass (Puesto Viejo) =

- Interactive map of Pampa Alta Pass
- Elevation: 865 metres (2,838 ft)

Third Approach
- Location: Argentina–Chile border
- Range: Andes
- Coordinates: 45°13′S 71°20′W

Pampa Alta Pass (Spanish: Paso Pampa Alta), also known as Puesto Viejo (Old Post), is a boundary pass between Argentina and Chile, joining Aysén del General Carlos Ibáñez del Campo Region and Chubut Province. The elevation of the pass is 865 metres (2,838 feet) above sea level. The pathway in this locality is a gravel road and traffic is allowed between 8 am and 8 pm in winter and between 8 am and 10 pm in summer. To leave Chile, it is necessary to obtain a pass from the international police in Coihaique. The nearest police assistance is situated 4 km (2.5 mi) away from the pass and the closest inhabited places are Balmaceda and Coihaique, in Chile.

== Geography ==
=== Climate ===
The climate in Pampa Alta Pass is subarctic (Csc/Dsc, according to the Köppen climate classification), with drier summers than winters and frequent snowfalls.

Climate data for Paso Pampa Alta/Puesto Viejo
| Month | Jan | Feb | Mar | Apr | May | Jun | Jul | Aug | Sep | Oct | Nov | Dec | Year |
|---|---|---|---|---|---|---|---|---|---|---|---|---|---|
| Mean daily maximum °C (°F) | 17.4 (63.3) | 17.2 (63.0) | 15.0 (59.0) | 11.7 (53.1) | 7.3 (45.1) | 3.8 (38.8) | 3.4 (38.1) | 5.4 (41.7) | 8.7 (47.7) | 11.8 (53.2) | 14.3 (57.7) | 16.3 (61.3) | 11.0 (51.8) |
| Daily mean °C (°F) | 11.7 (53.1) | 11.2 (52.2) | 9.2 (48.6) | 6.5 (43.7) | 3.1 (37.6) | 0.3 (32.5) | 0.0 (32.0) | 1.5 (34.7) | 3.9 (39.0) | 6.4 (43.5) | 8.7 (47.7) | 10.6 (51.1) | 6.1 (43.0) |
| Mean daily minimum °C (°F) | 6.0 (42.8) | 5.3 (41.5) | 3.5 (38.3) | 1.4 (34.5) | −1.1 (30.0) | −3.2 (26.2) | −3.4 (25.9) | −2.3 (27.9) | −0.9 (30.4) | 1.0 (33.8) | 3.2 (37.8) | 5.0 (41.0) | 1.2 (34.2) |
| Average precipitation mm (inches) | 21 (0.8) | 23 (0.9) | 37 (1.5) | 52 (2.0) | 74 (2.9) | 69 (2.7) | 66 (2.6) | 53 (2.1) | 41 (1.6) | 27 (1.1) | 26 (1.0) | 31 (1.2) | 520 (20.4) |
Source: Climate-data.org
