= Hogback Summit =

Mountain pass in Lake County, Oregon, US

- Location within Oregon
- Elevation: 5,033 ft (1,534 m)
- Traversed by: US 395

Third Approach
- Location: Lake County, Oregon, United States
- Coordinates: 42°47′35″N 120°05′03″W

Hogback Summit (elevation 5,033 feet or 1,534 metres) is a mountain pass in Lake County, Oregon, United States, traversed by U.S. Route 395.
