= Kolsuz Pass =

Kolsuz is a mountain pass in Niğde Province, Turkey

Kolsuz is situated next to a village with the same name on the highway D.805 connecting Niğde to the Mediterranean coast. It is 42 kilometres (26 mi) to Niğde and 11 kilometres (6.8 mi) to the D.750 highway, the main north to south highway in Central Anatolia which D.805 merges to. The coordinates are 37°39′19″N 34°31′53″E and the elevation is 1,490 metres (4,890 ft).

Çaykavak Pass a slightly higher pass lies 6 kilometres (3.7 mi) at the south. The north of Kolsuz pass is generally composed of high plains, typical of Central Anatolia.
