= McGillivray Pass =

Mountain pass in the Pacific Ranges of southwestern British Columbia, Canada

- Location within British Columbia
- Elevation: 1,867 m (6,125 ft)

Third Approach
- Location: British Columbia, Canada
- Range: Pacific Ranges
- Coordinates: 50°41′14″N 122°35′38″W
- Topo map: NTS 92J10 Birkenhead Lake

McGillivray Pass (1867 m or 6215 ft) is a mountain pass in the Pacific Ranges of southwestern British Columbia, Canada, located about 30 miles west of the town of Lillooet and immediately west of the upper end of Anderson Lake, above the former resort community of McGillivray (formerly McGillivray Falls). The pass connects the head of McGillivray Creek with the head of Standard Creek, a tributary of Cadwallader Creek and was used as a route by prospectors, miners and hunters heading for the upper Bridge River Country beyond the pass.

The pass was proposed at one time for a cog railway to connect the mines at Bralorne and Pioneer with the Pacific Great Eastern Railway (now part of CN but the project never went forward. There are private ski cabins near the summit area of the pass, which is the division between the Bendor Range to the east and the Cadwallader Range to the west (part of the Birkenhead Ranges).
