= Santelhöchi Pass =

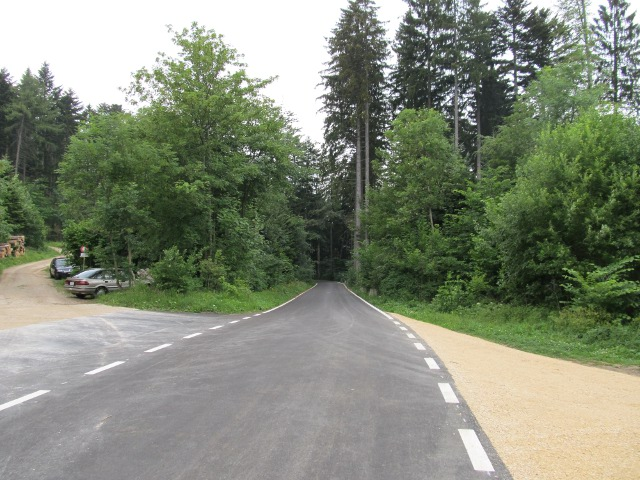
- Interactive map of Santelhöchi Pass
- Elevation: 797 metres (2,615 ft)

Third Approach
- Location: Switzerland
- Range: Jura Mountains
- Coordinates: 47°20′20.39″N 7°48′18.05″E

Santelhöchi Pass is a mountain pass in the canton of Solothurn in Switzerland.

It connects Egerkingen and Bärenwil. The pass is the shortest route from the Autobahn intersection at Egerkingen to Langenbruck, Waldenburg, Liestal, and Basel.

The Jurahöhenweg trail crosses the pass road between Hauenstein und Roggen (in the municipality of Balsthal).
