= Kotal-e Khushk =

Kōtal-e Khushk
- Location within Afghanistan

Highest point
- Coordinates: 33°53′50″N 66°0′53″E

Naming
- Native name: کوتل خشک (Arabic)

Geography
- Location: Afghanistan

Kōtal-e Khushk (Arabic: کوتل خشک), also called Ąaćbaną and Kōtal-e Darband, is a mountain pass in Daykundi Province, central Afghanistan.
