= Colle della Rho =

Alpine pass between Italy and France

- Col de la Roue, Colle della Rhô
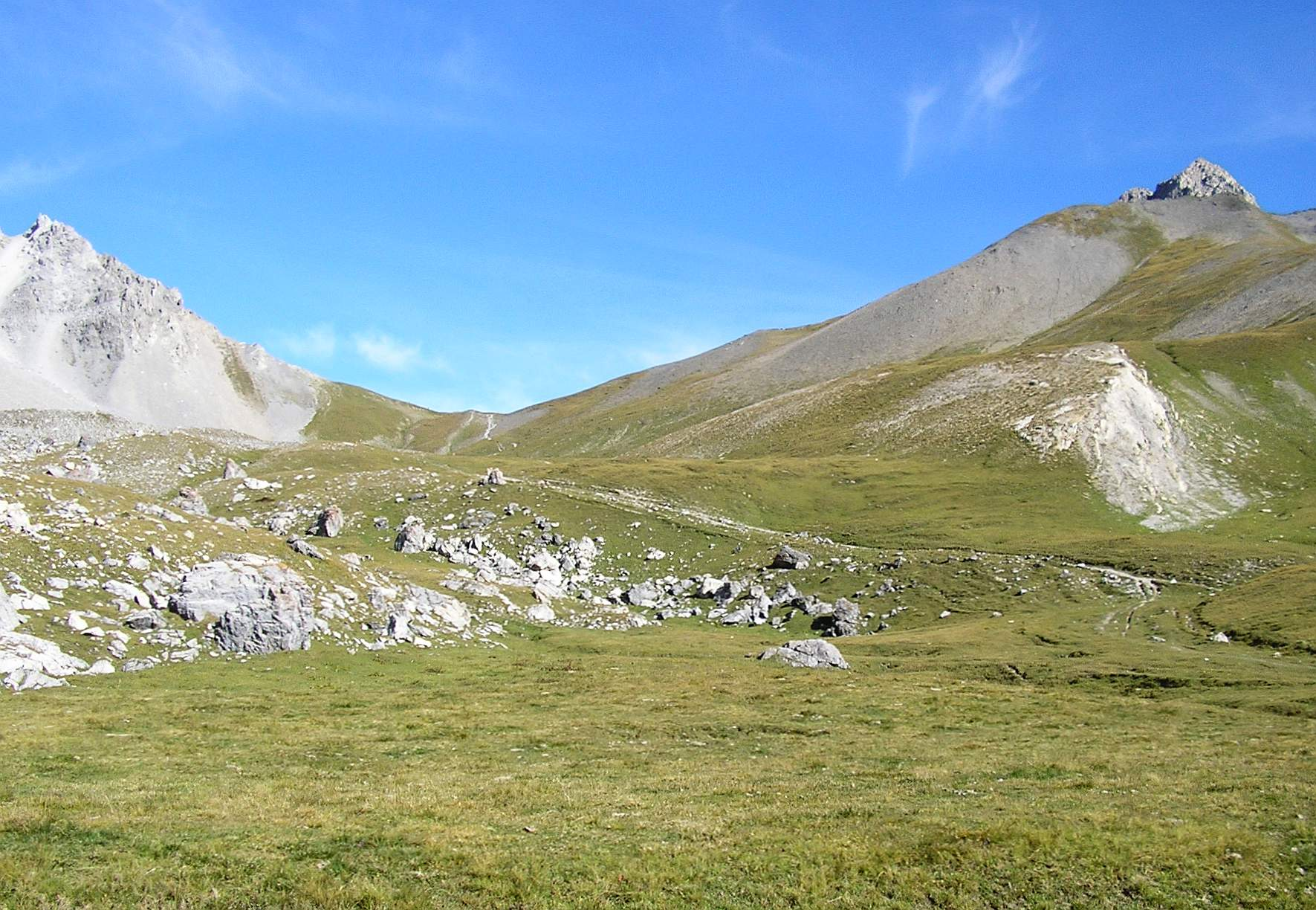

- Location within Alps
- Elevation: 2,541 m (8,337 ft)
- Traversed by: dirt road and bridle path

Location
- Location: Savoie, France / Province of Turin, Italy
- Range: Cottian Alps
- Coordinates: 45°06′58″N 6°38′34″E

The Colle della Rho (in Italian) or Col de la Roue (in French) is a mountain col at 2,541 metres (8,337 ft), at the border between the massif des Cerces and the Cottian Alps.

== Toponymy ==
The col was named in Latin Collis Rotae (literally Col of the Wheel), the same meaning of its present-day French name, Col de la Roue. On the official Italian maps at the beginning of the 20th century was added a "h" to an old name of the col, Colle della Rô, turning it in Colle della Rhô. Later on, the circumflex accent was lost, ending up in Colle della Rho, the present-day most common Italian name of the col. However, on some editions of the Italian official maps of IGM and on the technical map adopted by the Regione Piemonte the circumflex accent still appears.

== History ==
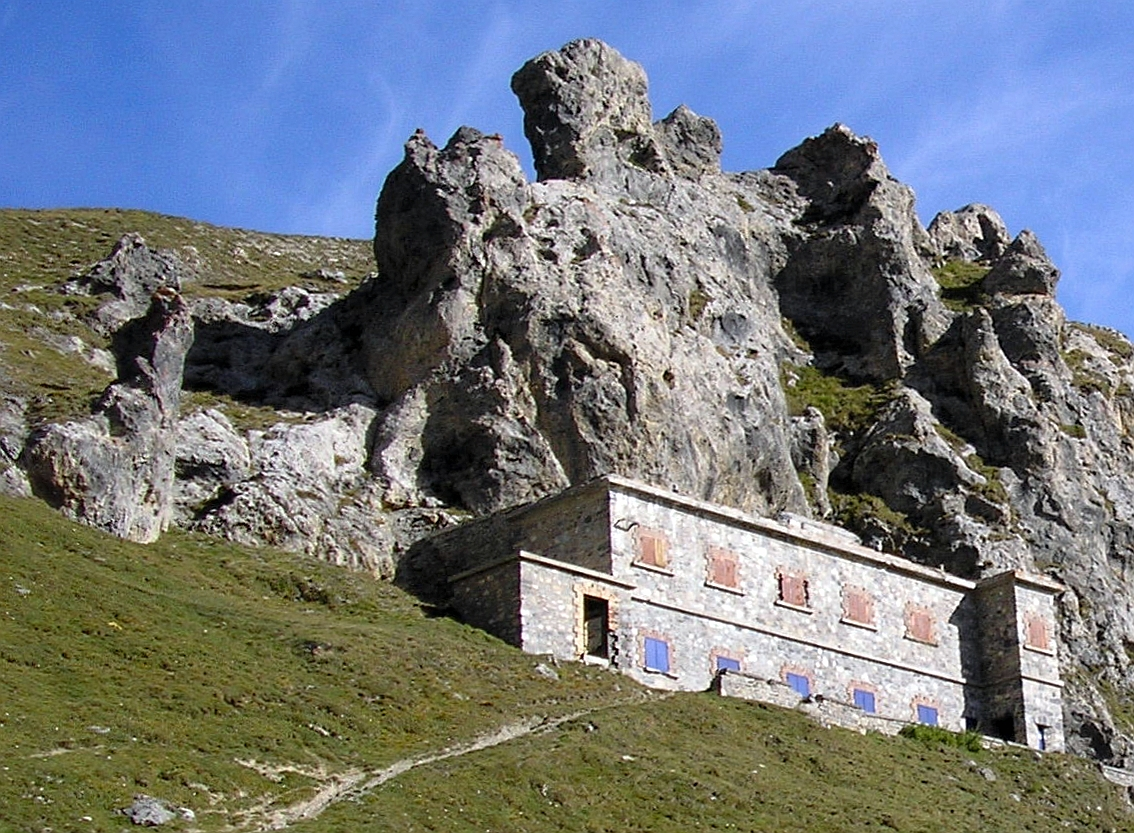
Pian dei Morti old barrack, on the Italian side of the col

The Colle della Rho, during antiquity, was one of the most frequented connections between Susa Valley and Maurienne; close to it some Roman coins have been found.
From the Middle Ages on, several battles and skirmish occurred on the pass, which was located at first on the border between Dauphiné and Savoy (up to the Peace of Utrecht, 1713) and later, from 1860 on, between France and Italy. The last fights near the pass were connected to the Italian invasion of France (June 1940).

== Geography ==
The pass is located on the border between France and Italy. It connects, from South to North, Bardonecchia (Italy) to Modane (France). It consists in a wide saddle between the Gran Bagna (3,083 m, SW of the pass) and the Roc de Jany (2,657 m, East), a satellite summit of the Punta Nera (3,047 m).
The path over the mountain pass is not paved. It can be reached by mountain bike.

== Access to the mountain pass ==
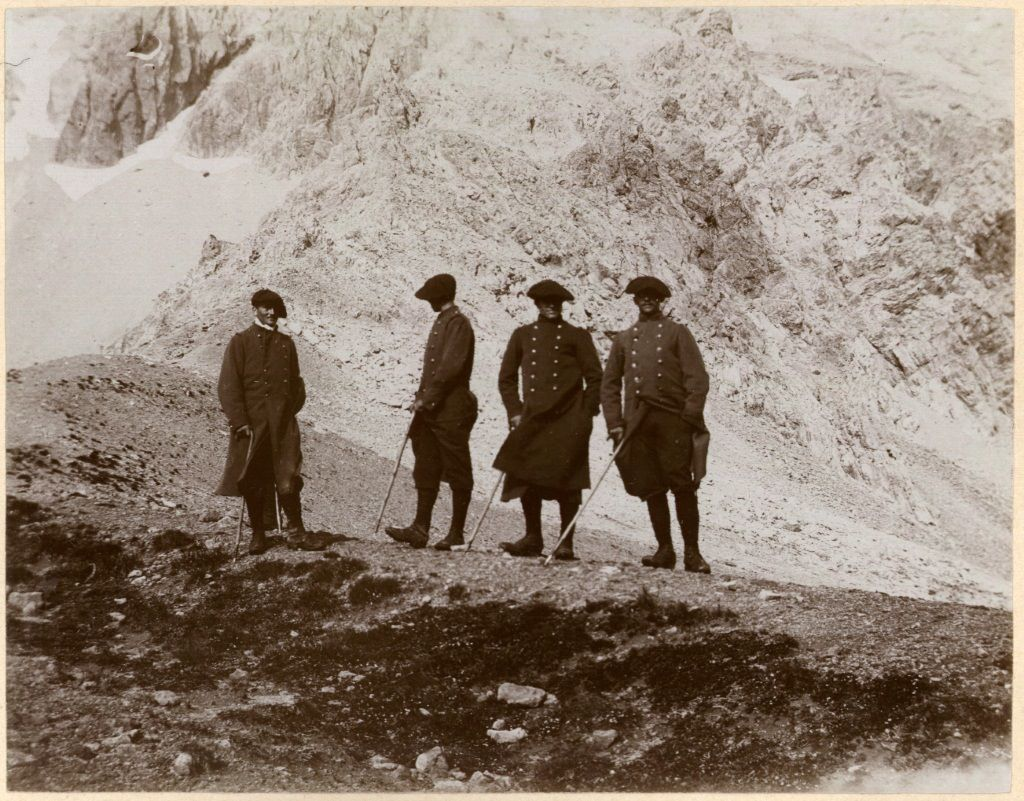
Early 20th century: four French soldiers on the hill (photo by Federico Filippi)

From the Italian side, the pass can be reached starting from Grange della Rho (1,686 m, Bardonecchia) via an old military dirt road closed to vehicular traffic which, above Pian dei Morti, turns into a wide mule track. Alternatively, there is a more direct footpath that runs along the true right side of the valley, connecting Grange della Rho to the barracks at Pian dei Morti. On the French side, a mule track connects the pass to the buildings at Lavoir; this path also forms part of the "Tour des Rois Mages" hiking route.

== See also ==
Media related to Colle della Rho at Wikimedia Commons

- France–Italy border
- List of mountain passes
