= Pescara Pass =

Mountain pass in Italy

The Pescara Pass is a mountain pass through the Abruzzi Apennines along the Pescara River. It lies south of Gran Sasso d'Italia, Italy.

A railroad from Pescara to Rome passes through several tunnels through and under the pass. The Valerian Way, an old Roman road, went through the pass.
