= Pircas Negras Pass =

Paso Pircas Negras
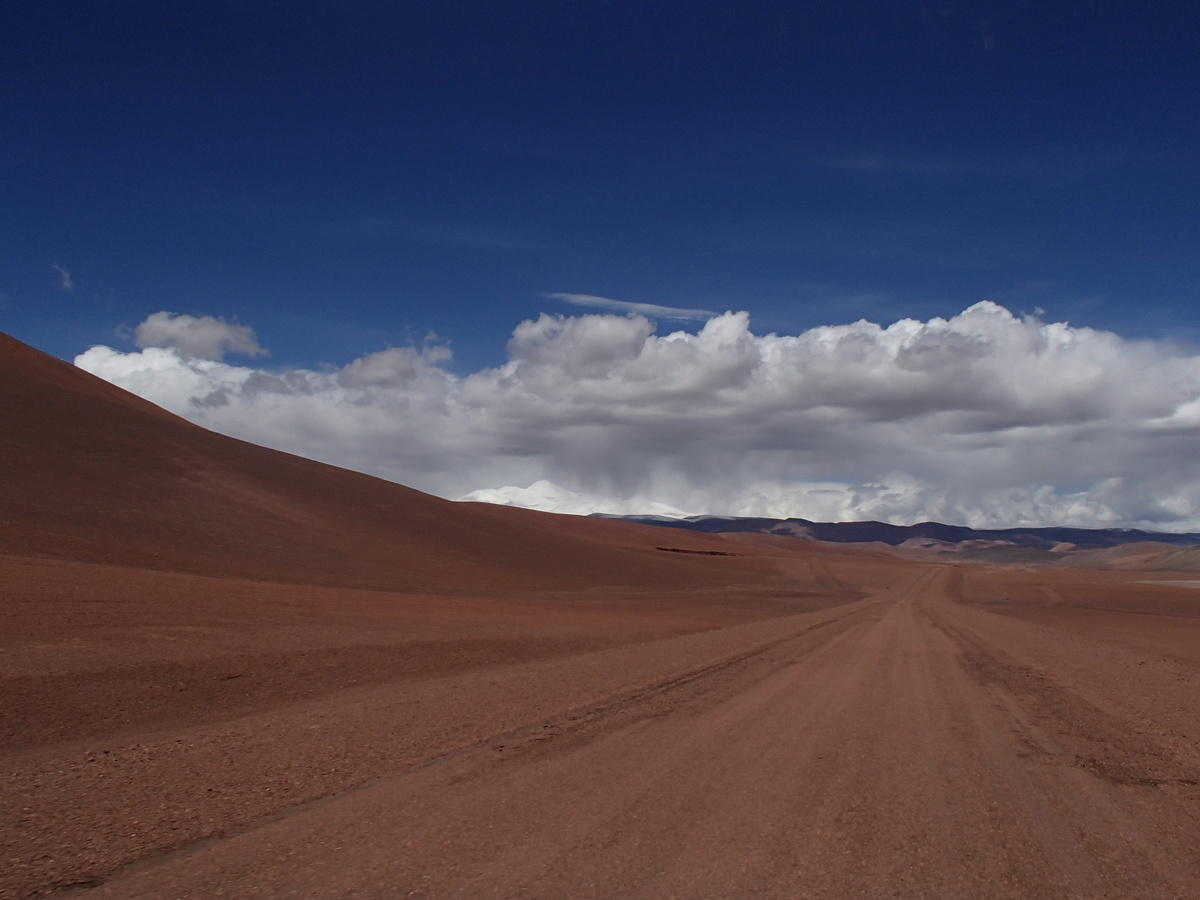

- Location within Argentina
- Elevation: 4,164 metres (13,661 ft)

Third Approach
- Location: Argentina–Chile border
- Range: Andes
- Coordinates: 28°04′00″S 69°18′00″W

The Pircas Negras Pass (Spanish: Paso Pircas Negras) is a pass over the Andes Mountains which connects Argentina and Chile. The border crossing between Argentina and Chile is at 4,164 m (13,661 ft) AMSL.

== Gallery ==
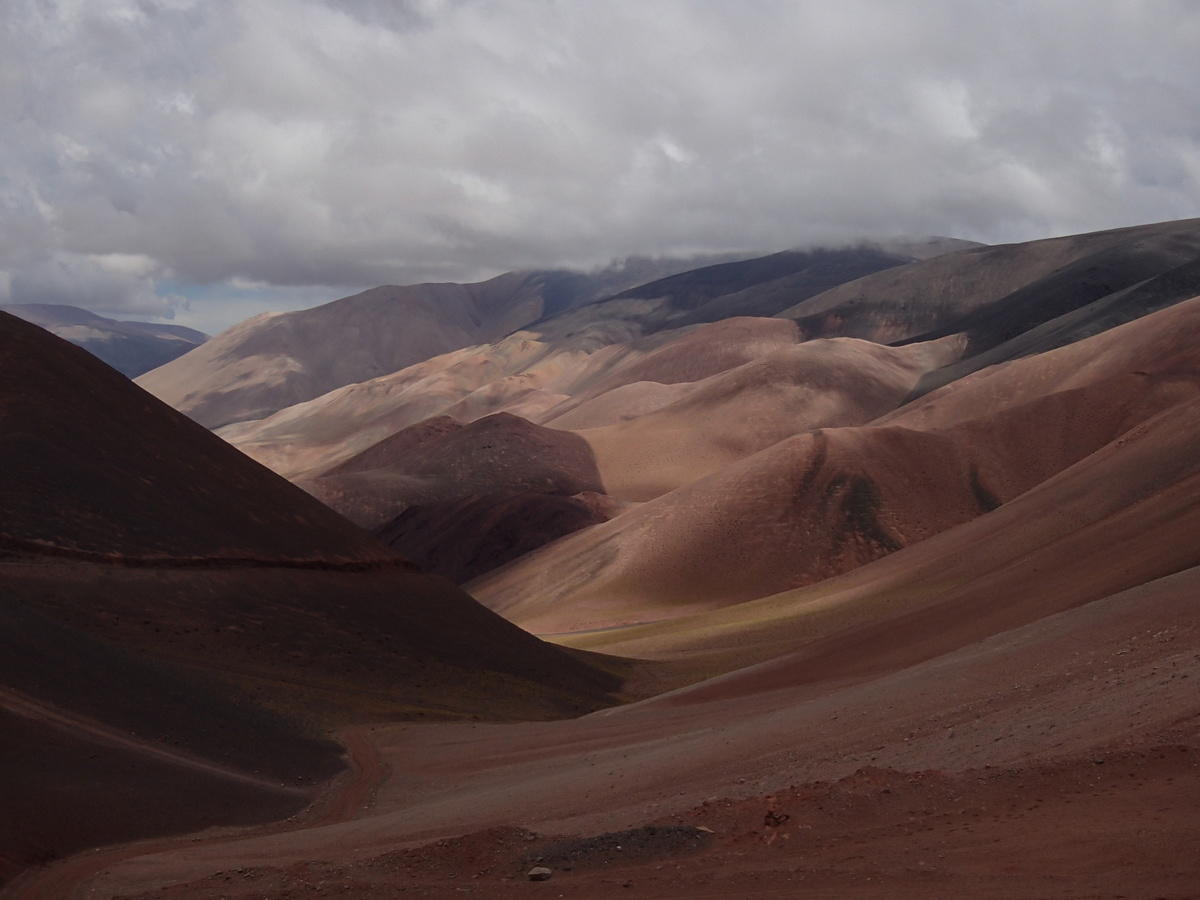
Pircas Negras Pass, Argentina, descent.

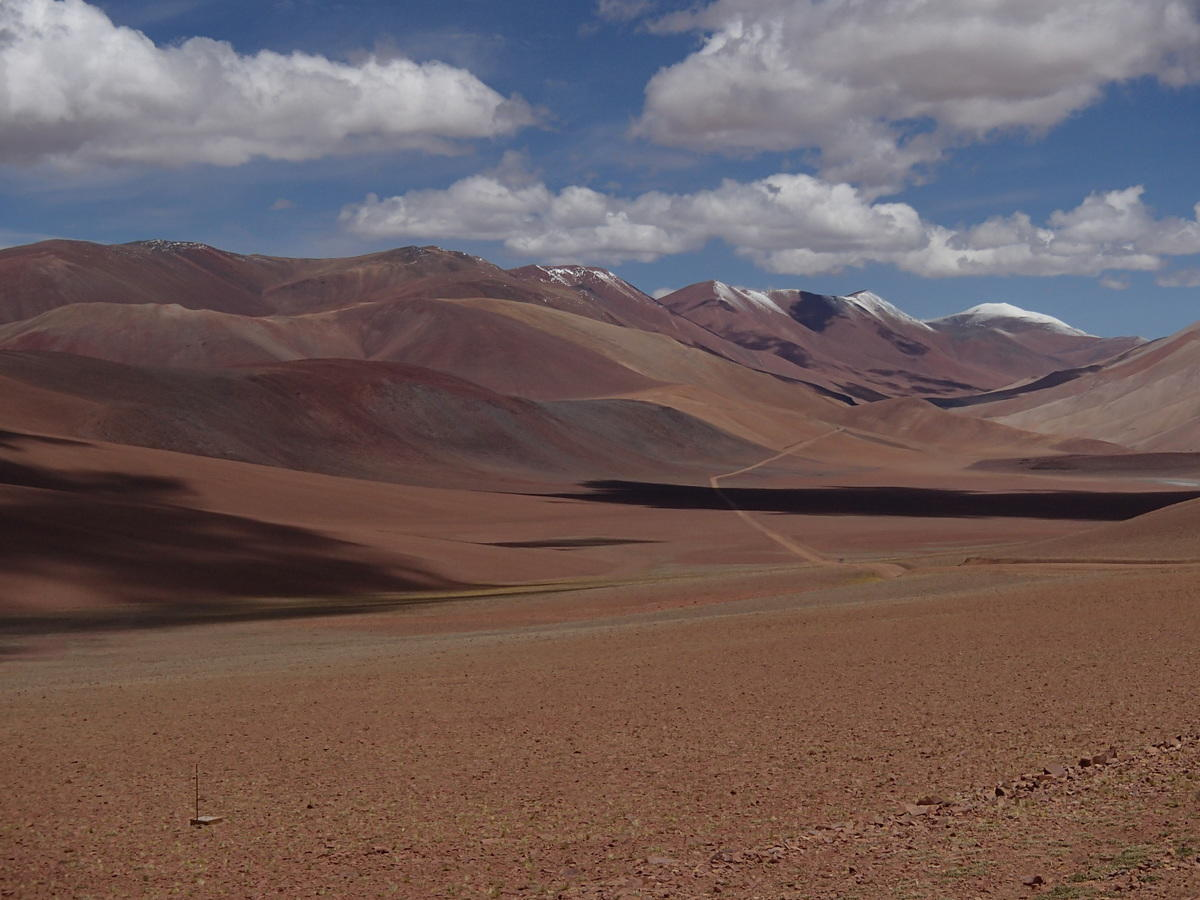
Pircas Negras Pass, Chilean side of border.

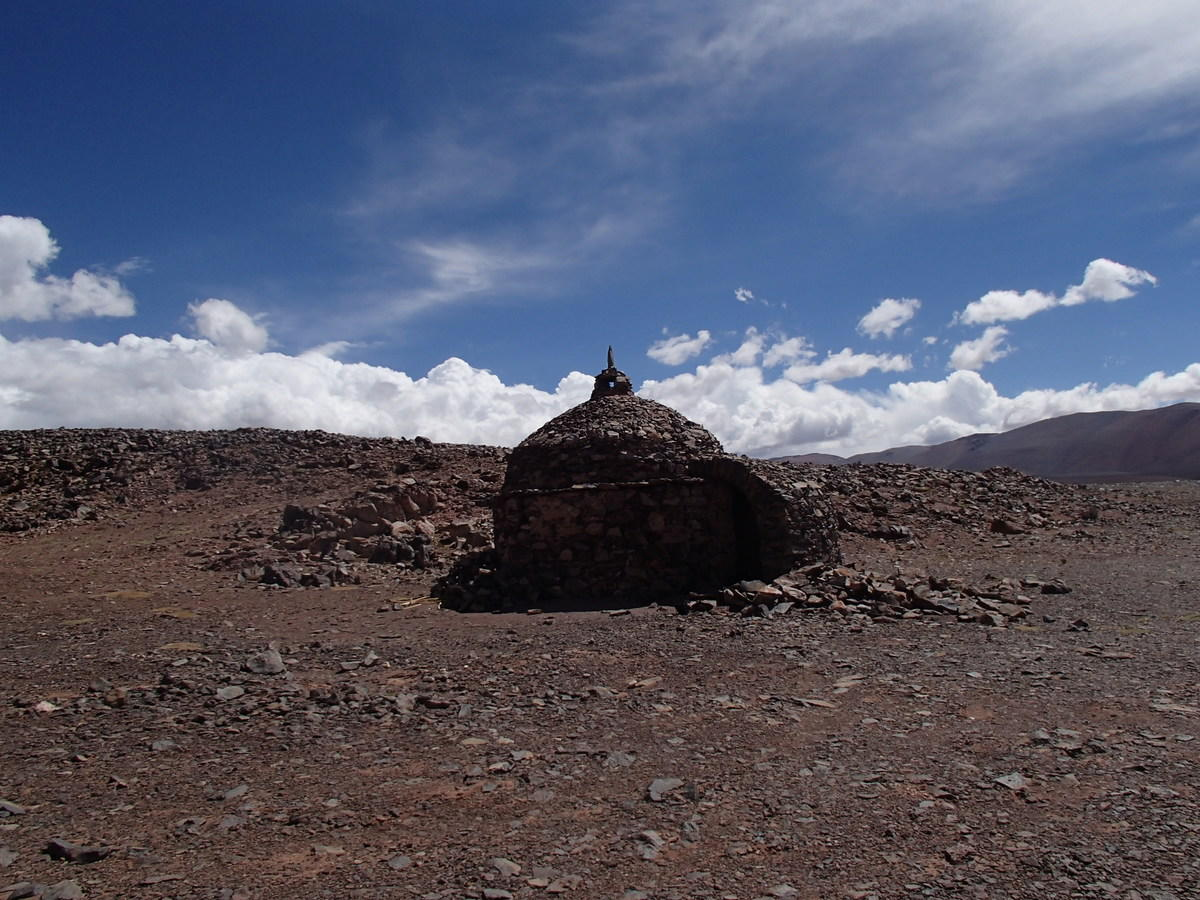
El Zajón refuge

== See also ==
- Atacama Region
- La Rioja Province, Argentina
