= Piper Pass =

Mountain pass in Nunavut, Canada

Joss Pass
- Location within Nunavut

Third Approach
- Location: Nunavut, Canada
- Range: United States Range
- Coordinates: 82°24′07″N 68°14′33″W
- Topo map: NTS 120F6 Barrier Glacier

Piper Pass is a mountain pass in the United States Range, Nunavut, Canada.
