= Bull Gap (Buncombe County, North Carolina) =

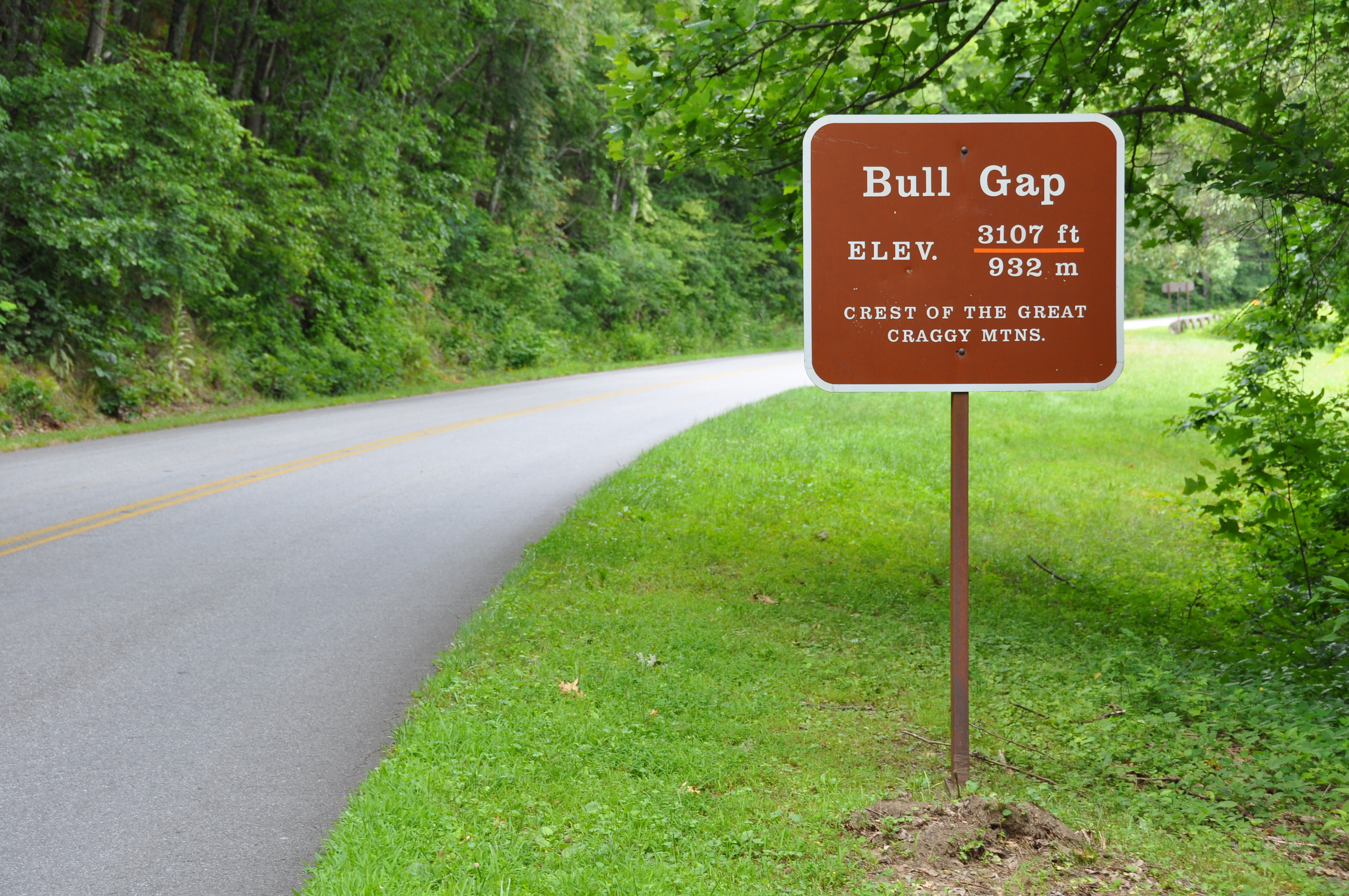
- Bull Gap, along the Blue Ridge Parkway

- Location within North Carolina
- Elevation: 3,107 feet (947 m)
- Traversed by: Blue Ridge Parkway

Third Approach
- Location: North Carolina; United States
- Range: Great Craggy Mountains
- Coordinates: 35°40′11″N 82°28′16″W
- Topo map: USGS Craggy Pinnacle

Bull Gap (el. 3,107 ft (947 m)) is a mountain pass on Bull Mountain, part of the Great Craggy Mountains. Though the Blue Ridge Parkway doesn't go through the gap, it is the most immediate to it and is accessible by hiking.
