= Pickle Gap =

Pass in Faulkner County, Arkansas, U.S.

Coordinates: 35.12647°N 92.40071°W

Pickle Gap is a pass in Faulkner County, Arkansas, in the United States.

== History ==
According to one account, the gap received its name when a container of pickles broke there while in transit.
