= Pass Creek Pass =

Mountain pass in Colorado, USA

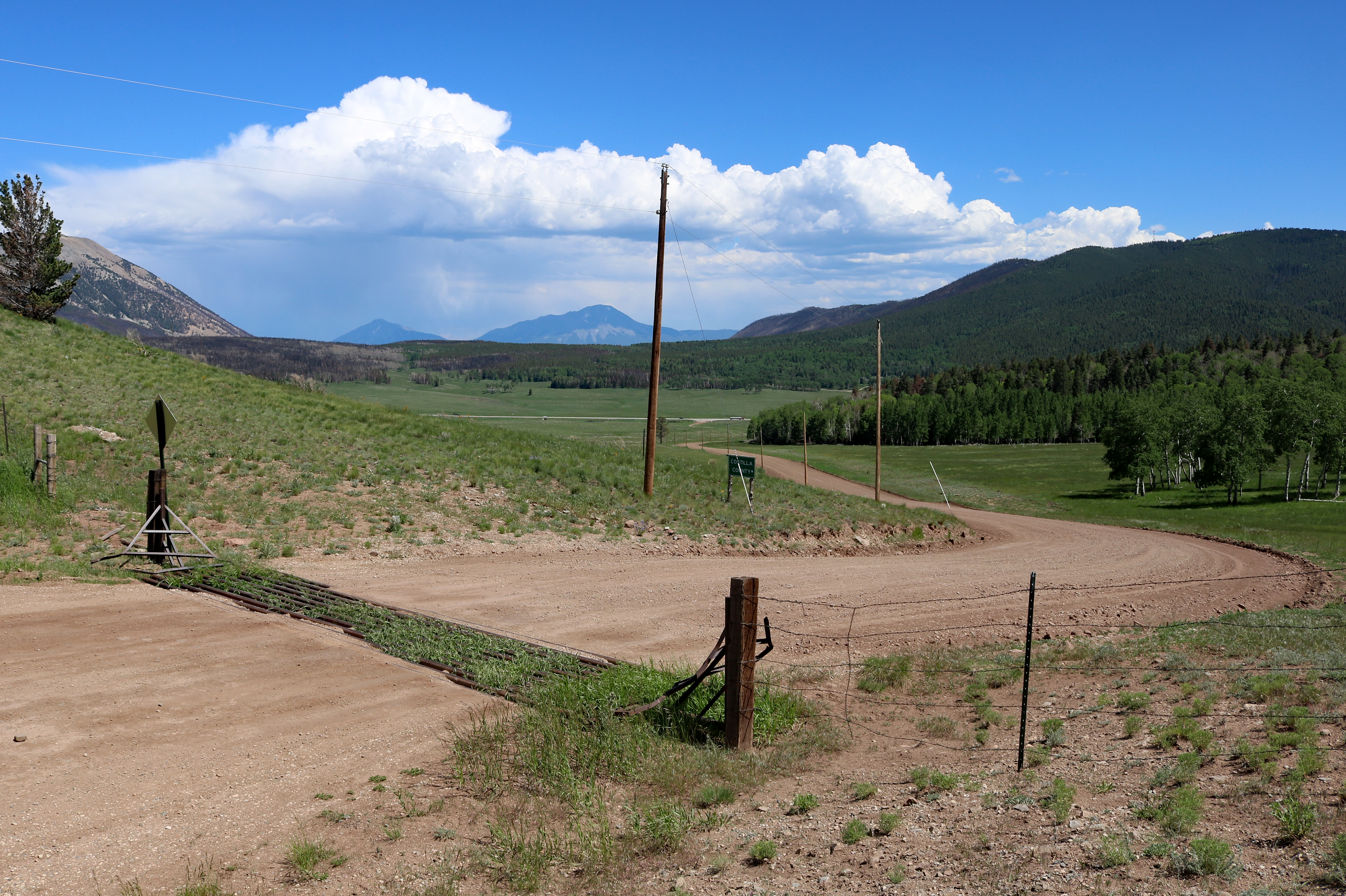
- The fence and cattle guard mark the top of the pass and the border between Huerfano and Costilla counties. U.S. Route 160 and the Spanish Peaks are also seen.

- Location within Colorado
- Elevation: 2,859 metres (9,380 ft)
- Traversed by: Pass Creek Road

Third Approach
- Location: Colorado, United States
- Range: Sangre de Cristo Mountains
- Coordinates: 37°37′14.03″N 105°13′46.01″W
- Topo map: La Veta Pass

Pass Creek Pass, elevation 9,380 feet (2,860 m), is a mountain pass along the border between Huerfano and Costilla counties in the southern part of the US state of Colorado. The pass marks the division between the Rio Grande and Arkansas River watersheds. Pass Creek flows generally north from the pass, merging with the Huerfano River near Gardner, Colorado. Sangre de Cristo Creek drains the south side of the pass.

Pass Creek Road traverses the pass. The Huerfano County section of the road is also called County Road 572. The road offers views of interesting geological features, including dikes and a section of the Dakota Formation.
