= Güresentepe Pass =

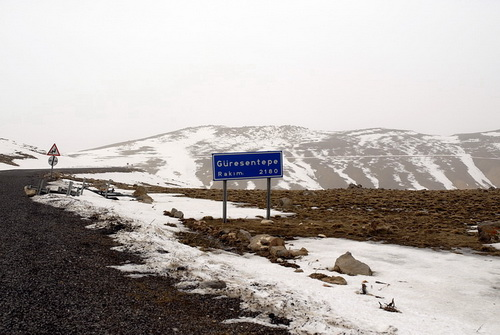
Sign showing the beginning of the pass

Güresentepe Pass is a pass in Turkey that links Niğde to Aksaray through the towns of Yeşilburç, Çiftlik and Güzelyurt. Its elevation is about 2180 meters. Due to heavy snowfall and strong winds, the pass is sometimes closed to traffic in the winter.
