= San Boldo Pass =

Mountain pass in Veneto, Italy

- Passo San Boldo
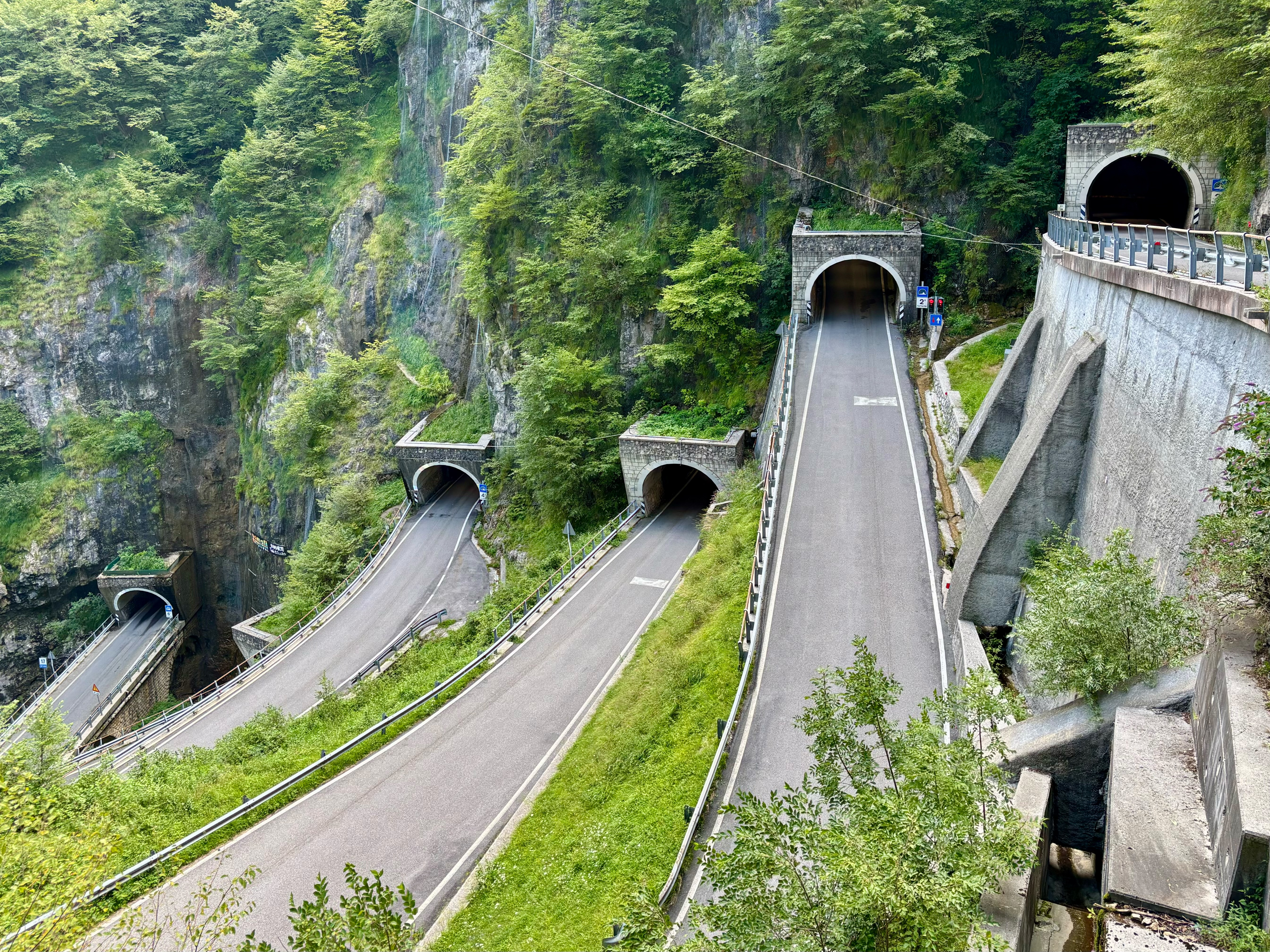
- South side of the San Boldo Pass.

- Location within Italy
- Elevation: 706 metres (2,316 ft)
- Traversed by: Road

Third Approach
- Location: Veneto, Italy
- Coordinates: 46°00′18″N 12°10′11″E

The San Boldo Pass (in Italian Passo San Boldo, formerly Passo Sant'Ubaldo and Umbaldopass) is a small mountain pass in Veneto between the towns of Trichiana [329 m (1,079 ft)] and Tovena in the Cison di Valmarino region [272 m (892 ft)] over a distance of 17 km (11 mi).

The pass lies at the southern edge of the Alps and connects the Val Belluna with the Val Mareno over a height of 706 m (2,316 ft). The mountain pass is called the SP 635 and only one lane is passable, the traffic is regulated by several sets of lights. There is a speed limit of 30 km/h (19 mph) and a height limit of 3.2 m (10.5 ft), after buses were repeatedly stuck in the tunnel. There are five tunnels blasted into the rock with hairpin turns or loops, and six bridges.

== History ==
Although the need to rebuild the steep road over the San Boldo pass into a motorable road was clear by the end of the 19th century, this project languished until the Austro-Hungarian army accomplished it from February to June 1918 as part of its World War I logistical efforts. The road to supply the Piave front was built in only three months. Due to its short construction period, it is nicknamed the "Road of 100 Days." Prisoners of war, the elderly, women, and children of the local population were pressed into service to build it. In its final construction phase, 1,400 workers worked in three shifts to build this strategically important connection. Despite the extreme topography, the requirement that the road be used for transporting heavy artillery and supplies meant that the grade could not exceed 12%.

== External ==
- information and map for Tovena, Italy
- WikiMapia content for San Boldo Pass
