= Chall Pass =

Mountain pass in Switzerland

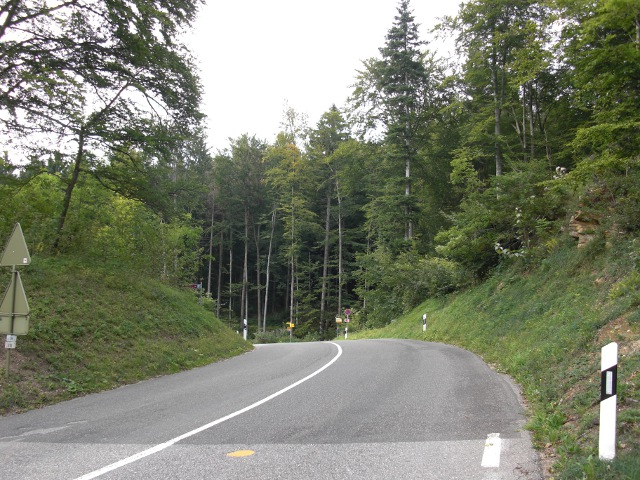
- Interactive map of Chall Pass
- Elevation: 747 metres (2,451 ft)

Third Approach
- Location: Switzerland
- Range: Jura Mountains
- Coordinates: 47°26′59.69″N 7°27′30.8157″E

Chall Pass (or Challpass) (el. 747 m.) is a mountain pass in the Jura Mountains on the border of the cantons of Solothurn and Basel-Country in Switzerland. The pass road links Metzerlen and Röschenz or Laufen on the Swiss common main road number 274. The pass got his name from the mountain Challhöchi; chall is Swiss German for the German word kahl (in the meaning of bare, without forest); Höchi Swiss German for Höhe (height).
