= List of highest paved roads in Europe =

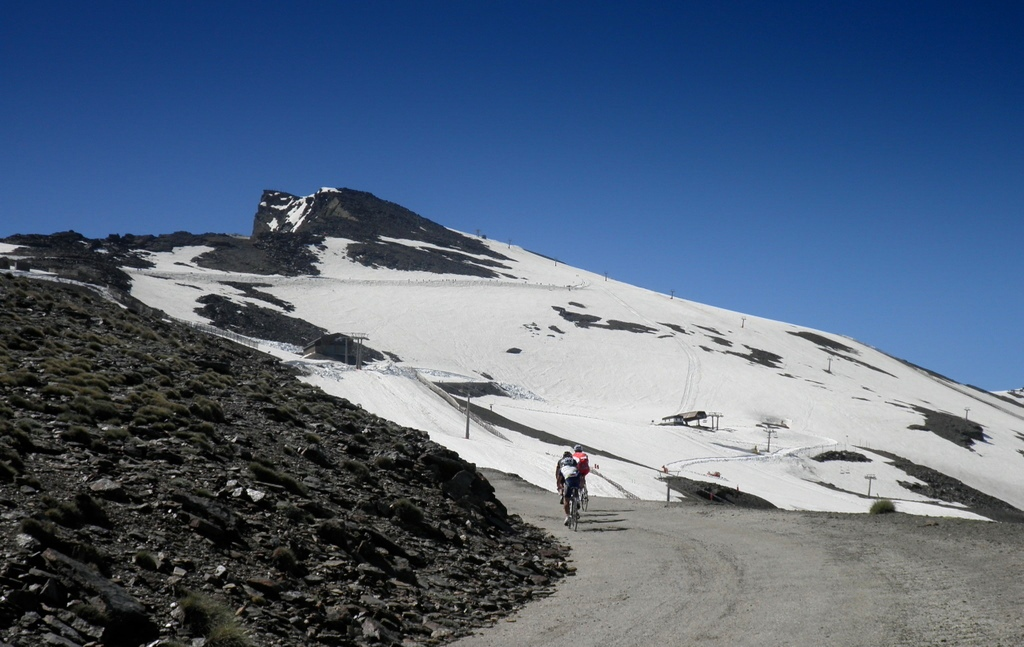
The Pico del Veleta road

This is a list of the highest paved roads in Europe. It includes roads that are at least 1 kilometre (0.62 miles) long and whose culminating point is at least 2,000 metres (6,562 feet) above sea level. This height approximately corresponds to that of the highest settlements in Europe and to the tree line in several mountain ranges such as the Alps and the Pyrenees, where most of the highest roads are located.

Some of the listed roads are closed to motorized vehicles, although they are normally all accessible to pedestrians and cyclists. These mountain roads are visited by drivers, motorcyclists, bicyclists and hikers for their scenery and often feature in the routes of European bicycle races such as the Giro d'Italia, the Tour de Suisse, the Tour of Austria, the Tour de France and the Vuelta a España. Due to snow conditions, most of the high roads are closed between (late) autumn and late spring/early summer.

Notes:

- Some places have several names, usually because of locating in an area with multiple official languages or locating on a language border.
- Near the highest point of the road there is often a sign that indicates the name and the elevation of the pass/hill/summit. The sign may, though, indicate a wrong elevation, being usually some old measurement. Also, popular navigation devices may present inaccurate elevations.

Below the list of highest roads is a list of the highest motorways (controlled-access highways) in Europe. It includes motorways whose culminating point is over 1,000 metres (3,281 feet) above sea level.

== Highest paved roads ==
| Highest elevation | Name(s) | Mountains | Country | Type | From / between | Remarks | Highest point |
|---|---|---|---|---|---|---|---|
| 3,300 m | Veleta | Baetic System | Spain | dead end (used to cross over, unpaved) | Granada | Access road from Granada. | 37°03′21″N 03°22′09″W |
| 2,829 m | Ötztaler Gletscherstraße; Tiefenbachferner; Rettenbachferner | Alps | Austria | dead end | Sölden | Access road to Tiefenbachferner (2,803 m) and Rettenbachferner (2,795 m) glaciers. | Tiefenbachferner: 46.924401°N 10.944541°E Rettenbachferner: 46.943573°N 10.925761°E |
| 2,802 m | Cime de la Bonette | Alps | France | loop road | Jausiers and Saint-Étienne-de-Tinée, via Col de la Bonette | Highest point in the Tour de France. | 44°19′18″N 6°48′25″E |
| 2,770 m | Col de l'Iseran | Alps | France | pass | Val-d'Isère (Tarentaise) and Bonneval-sur-Arc (Maurienne) | Highest paved pass in the Alps. | 45°25′1″N 07°01′51″E |
| 2,758 m | Stelvio Pass | Alps | Italy | pass | Prad am Stilfser Joch and Bormio | The highest paved pass in the Eastern Alps. Often designated the Cima Coppi in the annual running of the Giro d'Italia. | 46°31′43″N 10°27′10″E |
| 2,750 m | Kaunertaler Gletscherstraße | Alps | Austria | dead end | Prutz | Access road from Prutz via Feichten to the Weißseeferner skiing area. Also the highest bus stop in Austria. | 46°51′51″N 10°42′48″E |
| 2,744 m | Col Agnel / Colle dell'Agnello | Alps | France; Italy | pass | Queyras and Pontechianale | The highest international paved pass in the Alps. | 44°41′2″N 06°58′46″E |
| 2,715 m | Col de la Bonette | Alps | France | pass | Jausiers and Saint-Étienne-de-Tinée | Hors catégorie climb in the Tour de France. | 44.326685°N 6.807468°E |
| 2,645 m | Col du Galibier | Alps | France | pass | Saint-Michel-de-Maurienne and Briançon / Le Bourg-d'Oisans | | 45°03′50.4″N 06°24′28.8″E |
| 2,641 m | Colle del Nivolet | Alps | Italy | pass, dead end | Locana (Piedmont) | Lago Serrù (2,275 m) is bypassed along the road. Film location in The Italian Job, including the final bus crash. | 45°28′49″N 7°08′32″E |
| 2,621 m | Passo di Gavia | Alps | Italy | pass | Bormio (Sondrio) and Ponte di Legno (Brescia) | Often designated the Cima Coppi in the annual running of the Giro d'Italia. | 46°20′37″N 10°29′17″E |
| 2,571 m | Edelweißspitze | Alps | Austria | dead end | Fusch (Salzburg) and Heiligenblut (Carinthia) | | 47°07′25″N 12°49′53″E |
| 2,552 m | Road to Vintcheto | Rila | Bulgaria | pass, dead end | Pastra village (Rila valley) | Highest concrete-paved road in the Balkans. | 42°10′53″N 23°15′23″E |
| 2,504 m | Großglockner Hochalpenstraße | Alps | Austria | pass | Fusch (Salzburg) and Heiligenblut (Carinthia) | It has two passes: Hochtor (tunnel, 2,504 m) and Fuscher Törl (2,428 m). | 47.081167°N 12.842634°E |
| 2,501 m | Umbrailpass / Giogo di Santa Maria / Pass Umbrail | Alps | Switzerland; Italy | pass | Santa Maria Val Müstair and Bormio | Highest paved road in Switzerland. | 46°32′35″N 10°26′02″E |
| 2,481 m | Colle Fauniera | Alps | Italy | pass | Ponte Marmora / Valgrana and Demonte | Also known as Colle dei Morti ("Hill of the Dead"). | 44.3857°N 7.12189°E |
| 2,478 m | Nufenenpass / Passo della Novena | Alps | Switzerland | pass | Ulrichen and Airolo | Views of the Finsteraarhorn and the Gries Glacier. | 46°28′41″N 08°23′35″E |
| 2,474 m | Timmelsjoch / Passo del Rombo | Alps | Austria; Italy | pass | Ötz, Tyrol and St. Leonhard in Passeier, South Tyrol | Paved road projected before WW II but completed only in 1967. | 46°54′19″N 11°05′50″E |
| 2,469 m | Great St Bernard Pass | Alps | Switzerland; Italy | pass | Martigny, Valais and Aosta, Aosta Valley | Third highest road pass in Switzerland. | 45°52′08″N 7°10′14″E |
| 2,454 m | Col de la Moutière | Alps | France | pass | Saint-Dalmas-le-Selvage and Bayasse or Jausiers via the Col de Restefond | | 44.315179°N 6.796816°E |
| 2,432 m | Hochwurtenspeicher (Mölltaler Gletscherstraße) | Alps | Austria | dead end | Außerfragant | | 47.019400°N 13.009338°E |
| 2,429 m | Furkapass | Alps | Switzerland | pass | Gletsch, Valais and Realp, Canton of Uri | Used as a location in the James Bond film Goldfinger. Site of the Rhone Glacier, source of river Rhone. | 46°34′22″N 08°25′00″E |
| 2,420 m | Großsee | Alps | Austria | dead end | Döllach | | 47.014501°N 12.982048°E |
| 2,418 m | Mirador de Roque de los Muchachos | La Palma (Canary Islands) | Spain | dead end | Santa Cruz de La Palma and Hoya Grande | Not located in continental Europe but is part of Spain. | 28°45′15.99″N 17°53′6.56″W |
| 2,416 m | Colle Valcavera | Alps | Italy | pass | Demonte | | 44.381664°N 7.101095°E |
| 2,413 m | Col du Granon | Alps | France | pass | Saint-Chaffrey, La Salle-les-Alpes | Hors catégorie climb in the Tour de France, paved only on the west side. | 44°57′46″N 06°36′40″E |
| 2,408 m | Port d'Envalira | Pyrenees | Andorra | pass | Soldeu and El Pas de la Casa | Highest paved road pass in the Pyrenees. | 42°32′24.2″N 1°43′10.58″E |
| 2,402 m | Col de Tougnète | Alps | France | dead end | Les Ménuires | closed to motorised traffic | 45° 21' 52.79" N, 6° 33' 27.26" E |
| 2,394 m | Oscheniksee | Alps | Austria | dead end | Innerfragant | Side road from the Mölltaler Gletscherstraße to a reservoir lake. | 46.981293°N 13.084896°E |
| 2,394 m | Kalin Reservoir | Rila | Bulgaria | dead end | Pastra village (Rila valley) | Concrete-paved road to the highest reservoir lake in the Balkans. | 42°10′21″N 23°15′3″E |
| 2,390 m | Oberaarsee | Alps | Switzerland | dead end | Grimselpass (canton of Bern) | The highest point of the access road is c. 900 m before Oberaarsee, a reservoir lake at 2,303 m. | 46°33′08″N 08°16′48″E |
| 2,388 m | Griessee | Alps | Switzerland | dead end | Nufenen Pass road | Side road from Nufenenpass-road (from 2,304 m) to a reservoir lake. | 46°27′44″N 08°22′22″E |
| 2,387 m | Mottolino | Alps | Italy | dead end | Passo d'Eira | Paved for the 2024 Giro d'Italia, stage 15. | 46°31′40″N 10°09′42″E |
| 2,384 m | Flüelapass | Alps | Switzerland | pass | Davos and Susch, (Graubünden) | | 46°45′01″N 09°56′52″E |
| 2,379 m | Georgian Military Road, Jvari Pass | Caucasus Mountains | Georgia | pass | Vladikavkaz (Russia) and Tbilisi (Georgia) | | 42.5042°N 44.4538°E |
| 2,370 m | Colle Esischie | Alps | Italy | pass | Ponte Marmora and Pradleves | Along the road to Colle della Fauniera. | 44.397368°N 7.122224°E |
| 2,370 m | Plan du Lac | Alps | France | pass, dead end | Termignon | In the Vanoise National Park. | 45.338497°N 6.831833°E |
| 2,369 m | Kaiser-Franz-Josefs-Höhe | Alps | Austria | dead end | Fusch (Salzburg) and Heiligenblut (Carinthia) | Side road of the Grossglockner High Alpine Road (listed above), from c. 1,860 m. | 47.073530°N 12.754661°E |
| 2,363 m | Tenerife roads (Teide National Park) | Tenerife (Canary Islands) | Spain | pass | Several places, for example: Los Cristianos, El Médano, Santa Cruz de Tenerife (via La Laguna), Puerto de la Cruz (via La Orotava), Los Gigantes | Not located in continental Europe but belongs to Spain. | 28.259388°N 16.608356°W |
| 2,361 m | Col d'Izoard | Alps | France | pass | Briançon, and Guil, Queyras, Guillestre | Hors catégorie climb in the Tour de France | 44°49′12″N 06°44′07″E |
| 2,350 m | Lac de Moiry | Alps | Switzerland | dead end | Grimentz-Lac de Moiry-Lac de Châteaupré (canton of Valais) | | 46°06′24″N 07°34′44″E |
| 2,350 m | Col de la Lombarde / Colle della Lombarda | Alps | France; Italy | pass | Isola, via Isola 2000 and Vinadio | Hors catégorie climb in the Tour de France | 44°12′8″N 07°09′1″E |
| 2,350 m | Val Thorens | Alps | France | dead end | Moûtiers | Ski resort. Hors catégorie climb in the Tour de France | 45.299051°N 6.585247°E |
| 2,347 m | Col du Gondran | Alps | France | pass, dead end | Briançon | Not paved | 44.894390°N 6.703194°E |
| 2,340 m | Azau Meadow | Caucasus Mountains | Russia | dead end | Russian A158, from E50 in Baksan via Tyrnyauz | Road continues further up mount Elbrus unpaved. | 43°15′59″N 42°28′51″E |
| 2,340 m | Tre Cime di Lavaredo | Alps | Italy | dead end | Misurina | Sometimes designated the Cima Coppi in the annual running of the Giro d'Italia. | 46°37′07″N 12°18′20″E |
| 2,327 m | Berninapass / Passo del Bernina | Alps | Switzerland | pass | Celerina and Tirano | | 46°24.744′N 10°1.71′E |
| 2,326 m | Col de la Cayolle | Alps | France | pass | Barcelonnette and Saint-Martin-d'Entraunes | The road on the southern side leads to the red-rock Gorges de Daluis at Daluis. | 44°15′32″N 6°44′38″E |
| 2,317 m | Idalp (Idalpe) | Alps | Austria | dead end | Ischgl | | 46.982381°N 10.318209°E |
| 2,313 m | Forcola di Livigno | Alps | Switzerland; Italy | pass | Tirano (via Val Poschiavo) and Livigno | | 46°26′33″N 10°03′25″E |
| 2,311 m | Albulapass (Pass d'Alvra) | Alps | Switzerland | pass | Tiefencastel, via Bergün and La Punt (Engadin) | | 46°35′N 09°53′E |
| 2,311 m | Lago del Narèt | Alps | Switzerland | dead end | Fusio, Ticino | | 46°28′47″N 8°34′31″E |
| 2,310 m | Lago dei Cavagnöö | Alps | Switzerland | dead end | Lago di Robièi (Ticino) | Only accessible by cable car from San Carlo (Val Bavona), i.e. not connect to regular road network. | 46°27′19″N 8°30′30″E |
| 2,304 m | Col de la Loze | Alps | France | pass | Courchevel and Meribel | closed to motorised traffic | 45°24′18″N 6°36′07″E |
| 2,303 m | Tguma Parkplatz | Alps | Switzerland | dead end | Zillis, via Wergenstein | | 46.624896°N 9.368345°E |
| 2,302 m | Port de Cabús | Pyrenees | Andorra; Spain | pass | Erts and Llavorsí | | Port de Cabús: 42.546474°N 1.419852°E Coll de la Botella: 42.545707°N 1.452945°E |
| 2,291 m | Passo del Foscagno | Alps | Italy | pass | Livigno (via Passo d'Eira & Trepalle) and Bormio | | 46°29′42″N 10°12′32″E |
| 2,284 m | Colle di Sampeyre | Alps | Italy | pass | Sampeyre and Stroppo / Elva | Through the pass runs also a gravel high road, Strada dei Cannoni (or Varaita-Maira-Kammstraße, VMKS), an old military road: Its western end is c. 6 km away at Colle Bicocca (2,285 m). Eastwards it runs past Colle Rasticias (2,176 m, by 6.7 km), via Colle Birrone (1,698 m, by 14.5 km) and Colle della Ciabra (1,723 m, by 22 km) and then asphalted road to SP240 (crossing by 27 km). | 44°33′4″N 7°7′8″E |
| 2,284 m | Julierpass (Pass da Güglia) | Alps | Switzerland | pass | Silvaplana and Tiefencastel | watershed / drainage divide between the basins of the Rivers Rhine and Danube | 46°28.32′N 09°43.74′E |
| 2,280 m | Parking du Saut | Alps | France | dead end | Lac du Chevril | Side road from Col de l'Iseran -road, from c. 1,815 m. Asphalted road ends at a small parking area, below reservoir lake Ruisseau de la Sassière. Gravel road continues 3.5 km to reservoir lake Lac de la Sassière, the dam is at 2,460 m (height 22 m, length 315 m). | 45.486201°N 6.967419°E |
| 2,257 m | Bola del Mundo / Alto de las Guarramillas | Central System | Spain | dead end | Puerto de Navacerrada | Steep access road of 3.3 km from Puerto de Navacerrada (1,858 m) to Bola del Mundo mountain, also known as Alto de las Guarramillas. The road is paved with rough cement and is not open to regular road traffic. Soon after beginning there is a barrier. Some ramps reach steepness of 20 %. On the top there are antennas of the Spanish national TV (TVE). | 40.784952°N 3.980023°W |
| 2,257 m | Lago della Sella | Alps | Switzerland | dead end | Gotthard Pass | Side road from the Gotthard Pass. See also nearby Passo Scimfuss, listed below. | 46°33′33″N 08°35′34″E |
| 2,252 m | Col du Sanetsch | Alps | Switzerland | pass, dead end | Pont-de-la-Morge (or Sion) (Valais) | On the north side of the pass the asphalted road descents to reservoir Lac de Sénin (alt. 2,034 m, dam height 42 m), ending soon after at 2,048 m. Only a gondola lift to the Gsteig direction. | 46.331490°N 7.286210°E |
| 2,250 m | Col d'Allos | Alps | France | pass | Barcelonnette and Colmars | | 44.297229°N 6.593749°E |
| 2,244 m | Passo di Sella / Sella Joch | Alps | Italy | pass | Val Gherdëina, South Tyrol and Canazei, Fascia Valley | Highest road pass in the Dolomites. | 46.508158°N 11.767338°E |
| 2,241 m | Passo Scimfuss | Alps | Switzerland | dead end | Gotthard Pass | Side road from the Gotthard Pass. See also nearby Lago della Sella, listed above. | 46°32′35″N 08°35′28″E |
| 2,239 m | Dosso dei Galli | Alps | Italy | dead end | Passo del Maniva (1,664 m) and Passo di Croce Domini (1,892 m) | Side road from Sella dell'Auccia. Military road. Access restricted. | 45.853417°N 10.376190°E |
| 2,239 m | Passo Pordoi | Alps | Italy | pass | Canazei and Livinallongo del Col di Lana | Often designated the Cima Coppi in the annual running of the Giro d'Italia | 46.487530°N 11.812258°E |
| 2,236 m | Passo di Giau | Alps | Italy | pass | Cortina d'Ampezzo and Selva di Cadore / Livinallongo del Col di Lana | | 46°29.05′N 12°5.1′E |
| 2,231 m | Alpe Galm | Alps | Switzerland | dead end | Guttet – Oberu | | 46°21′23″N 07°40′52″E |
| 2,229 m | Arcalís (Estación de Esquí de Arcalís) | Pyrenees | Andorra | dead end | Ordino | Skiing area. Hors catégorie climb in the Tour de France. | 42.631388°N 1.480941°E |
| 2,225 m | Estación de esquí de Err-Puigmal (Jaça del Prat de Tossa) | Pyrenees | France | dead end | Err or crossing N116/D89 | Road from Err is narrow up to road D89, crossing at 1,790 m. Road D89 is used by most of the traffic. A small parking area at 2,040 m and no motorized vehicles sign at 2,045 m. Asphalted road ends by a ski lift of Err-Puigmal skiing area. Gravel road continues c. 1 km, max height 2,239 m, only paths thereafter. See also nearby Cim de Coma Morera, listed below. | 42.385512°N 2.087044°E |
| 2,223 m (tunnel) 2,259 m (pass, dead end) | Sustenpass | Alps | Switzerland | pass | Innertkirchen, (Canton of Bern) and Wassen, Canton of Uri | Views of the Steingletscher glacier. Asphalted side road of 0.3 km to Sustenpasshöhe (alt. 2259 m) is a dead end for vehicles, with only a hiking/MTB route to the eastern side. Length of the Sustenpass tunnel is 325 m. | 46.72875°N 8.44913°E |
| 2,223 m | Männlichen | Alps | Switzerland | pass, dead end | Grindelwald Grund | Not for motorised vehicles (except for authorized). Only a gondola lift to the other side (Wengen). | 46.613461°N 7.941113°E |
| 2,215 m | Col de Portet | Pyrenees | France | pass, dead end | Saint-Lary-Soulan | Hors catégorie climb in the Tour de France. On the other side of the pass a gravel road (partly very steep) to Lac de l'Oule and below. | 42°49′59″N 0°14′12″E |
| 2,215 m | Täschalp | Alps | Switzerland | dead end | Visp, via Täsch | | 46°03′30″N 07°48′45″E |
| 2,211 m | Penserjoch / Passo di Pennes | Alps | Italy | pass | Sterzing/Vipiteno and Bolzano | | 46.818768°N 11.441487°E |
| 2,210 m | Passo d'Eira | Alps | Italy | pass | Livigno and Trepalle | A modest elevation between Livigno and Trepalle. | 46.538316°N 10.166272°E |
| 2,208 m | Col des Tentes | Pyrenees | France | dead end | Luz-Saint-Sauveur, via Gèdre | From the parking area at the top, a narrow paved road continues 800 m to c. 2,180 m. After the pavement ends, the road quality drops and it soon becomes a path which is blocked with stones, before reaching the Spanish border at Port de Boucharo/Puerto de Bujaruelo at 2,270 m. In the 20th century, there were plans to build a road to the pass also from the Spain. | 42°42′49″N 0°3′4″E |
| 2,205 m | Cim de Coma Morera | Pyrenees | France | dead end | Osséja | There are two asphalted roads between crossings at 1,665 and 1,986 m, western option being 2.7 km longer and going via Coll de Pradelles (1,991 m). Road ends at a fenced parking area. Fence protects hikers’ and ranchers’ cars from the cattle, walking freely in the area. Height of Cim de Coma Morera, a flat grassy hill, is 2,208 m. See also nearby Estación de esquí de Err-Puigmal, listed above. | 42.355974°N 2.023208°E |
| 2,205 m | Lac du Vieux Émosson | Alps | Switzerland | dead end | Finhaut, via Lac d'Émosson | Public access to Lac d'Émosson dam (1932 m), restricted access to Lac du Vieux Émosson dam. | 46°03′47″N 06°53′56″E |
| 2,204 m | Mattmarksee | Alps | Switzerland | dead end | Visp, via Stalden | A reservoir lake. | 46°03′01″N 07°57′50″E |
| 2,200 m | Lac d'Aumar | Pyrenees | France | pass, dead end | Saint-Lary-Soulan | Side road from the road to Lac de Cap-de-Long, listed below. Road reaches maximum just before Lac d'Aumar (alt. 2,192 m). Road continues past it, 1.2 km to nearby Lac d'Aubert (alt. 2,148 m). | 42.837873°N 0.156618°E |
| 2,192 m | Passo di Valparola | Alps | Italy | pass | Badia and Cortina d'Ampezzo / Andráz, via Passo di Falzarego | Nearby is Passo di Falzarego, listed below. On the northern side of the pass is Rifugio Passo Valparola (alt. 2,168 m). | 46°31′59.88″N 11°58′59.88″E |
| 2,190 m | Embalse de Llauset (La Presa de Llauset) | Pyrenees | Spain | dead end | Senet | Side road from road N-230. After Aneto the road quality is very poor. Last 1.4 km the road is in a dark tunnel. | 42.57279°N 0.712757°E |
| 2,188 m | Col du Petit-Saint-Bernard / Colle del Piccolo San Bernardo | Alps | France; Italy | pass | Tarentaise, (Savoie) and Pré-Saint-Didier (Aosta Valley) | | 45°40′49″N 6°53′2″E |
| 2,181 m | Col du Petit Mont Cenis | Alps | France | dead end | Lanslebourg | Asphalted side road (7.7 km) starts below/south of the Col du Mont Cenis (listed below) and ends by restaurant Ferme des Coulours. Last c. 100 m to the grassy pass (2,184 m) is gravel. | 45.210734°N 6.865439°E |
| 2,176 m | Colle delle Finestre | Alps | Italy | pass | Susa Valley and Val Chisone | Northern side (from Susa) of this road is gravel from c. 1,450 m, but it is a classic climb in Giro d'Italia. | 45°04′18.49″N 7°03′12.48″E |
| 2,175 m | Lac de Cap-de-Long | Pyrenees | France | dead end | Saint-Lary-Soulan | Nearby is Lac d'Aumar, listed above. | 42.819485°N 0.141332°E |
| 2,174 m | Croix de Coeur | Alps | Switzerland | pass | Sembrancher, via Verbier and Riddes | Both sides are nowadays paved. | 46°07′18″N 07°13′57″E |
| 2,168 m | Tikmataji Pass | Caucasus Mountains | Georgia | pass | Tbilisi Tsalka and Ninotsminda Akhalkalaki | Baku–Tbilisi–Kars railway also goes via this pass. | 41°29′46″N 43°52′18″E |
| 2,164 m | Grimselpass | Alps | Switzerland | pass | Innertkirchen, Bern and Gletsch, Valais | | 46°33.72′N 8°20.34′E |
| 2,162 m | Helkhütte | Alps | Switzerland | dead end | Grindelwald | Listed formerly as Oberläger. From Grindelwald: Spillstattstrasse, Geisstutzstrasse (steep), Bussalpstrasse. 130 m before Bussalp turn right (no sign). From Mittelläger to crossing at Oberläger (2,022 m) the road is steep (1.3 km/15 %). 1.0 km road (sign: Burg) to Helkhütte has even steeper sections and also 2 gravel sections (0.2 & 0.3 km). Helkhütte is a cattle farm. Its name is carved to its eastern wall. Grassy unnamed pass by the road is at 2,157 m. From the crossing at Oberläger, another steep road (130 m) to 2,044 m. Bussalpstrasse is not for motorized vehicles (except as authorized). | 46.65740°N 7.98104°E |
| 2,159 m | Vallter 2000 (Estació d'esquí de Vallter 2000) | Pyrenees | Spain | dead end | Camprodon | Ski resort. | 42.427091°N 2.265253°E |
| 2,155 m | Calar Alto | Baetic System | Spain | pass | road A92 (below Aulago) and Gérgal/Serón/Tíjola | Calar Alto Observatory | 37.222365°N 2.547840°W |
| 2,150 m | Les Arcs 2000 | Alps | France | dead end | Bourg-Saint-Maurice | Tarentaise, (Savoie) | 45.570560°N 6.832641°E |
| 2,148 m | Ofenpass / Pass dal Fuorn | Alps | Switzerland | pass | Zernez, Engadin and Val Müstair | | 46°38.472′N 10°17.598′E |
| 2,146 m | Alp da Stierva | Alps | Switzerland | dead end | Tiefencastel, via Stierva | Some gravel sections above 2,000 m. Road ends at a cattle farm. | 46.647840°N 9.510383°E |
| 2,145 m | Transalpina (Pasul Urdele) | Carpathian Mountains | Romania | pass | Novaci and Sebeș | The Transalpina road (DN67C) is the highest paved road in Romania. Widening and asphalting works started in 2010, but are not yet finished. c. 2–3 km of roadbed-only – alternating with asphalted areas – and several viaducts with only one-lane accessibility and tens of unfinished ditches across the road for collecting water from the slopes, which require slowing down to 5–10 km/h. It also lacks safety elements – parapets, reflective aids, road marks, road signs. c. 6 km north is another pass, Pasul Muntiu (c. 2,095 m). Between the passes, the road descends to c. 1,940 m. | 45.345°N 23.657°E |
| 2,141 m | Grande Dixence Dam | Alps | Switzerland | dead end | Sion, via Hérémence | Tallest dam in Europe, 285 m (6th tallest dam overall), length 700 m. Lac des Dix (alt. 2,364 m), the reservoir lake, is the largest lake above 2,000 m in the Alps. | 46°05′03″N 07°24′13″E |
| 2,140 m | Tignes Val Claret | Alps | France | dead end | Tarentaise (Savoie) | Side road D87A from Col de l'Iseran -road, from c. 1,800 m. The road first runs along the Tignes Dam (altitude 1,790 m, height 160 m, length 295 m) by reservoir lake Lac du Chevril and continues then past Tignes (partly in a tunnel) and past Lac de Tignes to a roundabout at 2,100 m, which is below the village of Tignes Val Claret. | 45.453756°N 6.901585°E |
| 2,136 m | Collado de las Sabinas | Baetic System | Spain | pass | Güejar Sierra and kilometer point 33.4 of the Veleta Road | | 37.115432°N 3.422194°W |
| 2,135 m | Großer Speikkogel | Alps | Austria | dead end | Maildorf | Access road to a radio/TV-transmitter and a radar station. There is a barrier at c. 1,630 m (4.3 km from the top). | 46.786929°N 14.971236°E |
| 2,135 m | Rifugio Forni (Rifugio Ghiacciaio dei Forni) | Alps | Italy | dead end | Santa Caterina di Valfurva | Side road from Passo di Gavia -road (SP29), with some steep sections. Gravel from c. 2,135 m. Rifugio is at 2,176 m. | 46.420014°N 10.553222°E |
| 2,134 m | Berghaus Nagens | Alps | Switzerland | dead end | Laax | | 46°51′42″N 09°13′50″E |
| 2,133 m | Passo Gardena / Grödner Joch | Alps | Italy | pass | Sëlva, Val Gardena and Corvara, South Tyrol | | 46.549812°N 11.808529°E |
| 2,133 m | Parking de Laus (Lac d'Allos parking) | Alps | France | dead end | Colmars | Side road from the Col d'Allos road. The road ends at a parking area. From there it is c. 2 km hike to the beautiful Lac d'Allos (at 2,230 m). | 44.245437°N 6.698065°E |
| 2,131 m | Col Carette | Alps | Italy | pass, dead end | Monno (Brescia) | The grassy geographical pass is at c. 2,095 m. The road reaches higher. On the other side of the pass the asphalted road continues 3.9 km (to near Chalet La Cort), dead end at c. 1,820 m. Along the way, at 1,936 m, a gravel road down to Vezza d'Oglio. | 46.255789°N 10.362767°E |
| 2,130 m | Campo Imperatore | Apennines | Italy | dead end | Assergi | The road leads to the hotel where Italian army kept Benito Mussolini imprisoned (see also Gran Sasso raid). It is often a stage in the Giro d'Italia bike race. Located near the Gran Sasso d'Italia mountain (2,912 m). | 42°28′N 13°33′E |
| 2,130 m | Roki Tunnel | Caucasus Mountains | Georgia/Russia | pass | Tskhinvali Region(Samachablo)/North Ossetia–Alania | | 42°36′03″N 44°06′54″E |
| 2,130 m | Via Monterotta | Alps | Italy | pass, dead end | Sestriere | Side road of 3.8 km from Sestriere. The paved road ends soon after the pass. | 44.955061°N 6.844043°E |
| 2,125 m | Juf (Avers valley) | Alps | Switzerland | dead end | Ausserferrera | After reaching this small village, the paved road descents to 2,116 m. Juf is the highest village with permanent residents in the Alps, although Trepalle village stretches up higher, to 2,210 m. | 46°26′45″N 09°34′45″E |
| 2,115 m | Col du Tourmalet | Pyrenees | France | pass | Sainte-Marie-de-Campan and Luz-Saint-Sauveur | Hors catégorie climb in the Tour de France. | 42°54′29.50″N 0°8′42.40″E |
| 2,114 m | Splügenpass / Passo dello Spluga | Alps | Switzerland; Italy | pass | Splügen (Graubünden) and Chiavenna (Lombardy) | Described by Mary Shelley in 1844. Several tunnels on Italian side. | 46°30.36′N 09°20.22′E |
| 2,109 m | Arolla | Alps | Switzerland | dead end | Sion, via Les Haudères (canton of Valais | Highest point above Arolla village (alt. 2,009 m). Or, instead of turning right to Arolla village, pavement of Val d'Arolla -road ends at 2,027 m (after a pumping station). | 46.025629°N 7.477918°E |
| 2,108 m | Lauchernalp | Alps | Switzerland | dead end | Wiler | See also nearby Weritzstafel, listed below. Crossing to these villages is at 1,871 m. | 46.415186°N 7.768990°E |
| 2,108 m | Col de Vars | Alps | France | pass | Saint-Paul-sur-Ubaye and Vars, Hautes-Alpes / Guillestre | | 44°32′20″N 6°42′10″E |
| 2,106 m | Coll de Pal | Pyrenees | Spain | pass, dead end | Bagà | Road BV-4024 from north of Bagà. At the top, the paved road continues 1.9 km to 2,025 m, where a gravel road continues towards La Molina and Masella ski resorts (crossing to those is another 1.9 km later at 1,950 m). Note: Nearby is 5 km long Túnel del Cadí. The tunnel and its access roads are forbidden for pedestrians and cyclists. | 42.3039°N 1.9223°E |
| 2,106 m | Gotthardpass / Passo del San Gottardo (main road) | Alps | Switzerland | pass | Airolo, Ticino and Göschenen, Canton of Uri | | 46.559167°N 8.561389°E |
| 2,106 m | Gotthardpass / Passo del San Gottardo (via Tremola) | Alps | Switzerland | pass | Motto Bartola, Ticino and Brüggloch, Canton of Uri | Historical road paved with granite stones. | 46.559167°N 8.561389°E |
| 2,105 m | Passo di Falzarego | Alps | Italy | pass | Andráz and Cortina d'Ampezzo | Nearby is Passo di Valparola, listed above. | 46°31′8″N 12°0′34″E |
| 2,105 m | Schöneben / Belpiano | Alps | Italy | loop road | Reschen (Reschensee) and San Valentino alla Muta | Skiing area. Possible to drive also the ramp to the ski station (at c. 2,115 m). | 46.804578°N 10.489043°E |
| 2,103 m | Sella dell'Auccia | Alps | Italy | pass | Passo del Maniva and Passo di Croce Domini | Paved from Passo del Maniva (1,664 m). Unpaved (at least partly) from Passo di Croce Domini (1,892 m). Not the highest point of the road but access to slightly higher points may be unpaved. | 45°51′34″N 10°22′35″E |
| 2,102 m | Tauernmoossee | Alps | Austria | pass, dead end | Uttendorf, via Enzingerboden | Access road to a reservoir lake. After reaching the highest point (2,102 m, unnamed pass), road becomes a gravel road and descents to Tauernmoossee (2,023 m). In Enzingerboden (1,470 m), at the beginning of the access road, there is a barrier. | 47.169045°N 12.647056°E |
| 2,100 m | Cirque de Troumouse | Pyrenees | France | dead end | Luz-Saint-Sauveur, via Gèdre | | 42.727977°N 0.095560°E |
| 2,100 m (ca.) | Col des Champs | Alps | France | pass | Saint-Martin-d'Entraunes and Colmars | The height of the geographical pass is c. 2,060 m. The road reaches c. 2,100 m, about 0.5 km south of the pass sign at 2,089 m. | 44.170980°N 6.700520°E |
| 2,100 m | Col du Sabot | Alps | France | pass, dead end | Vaujany | Side road from the Col de la Croix de Fer road. | 45.190366°N 6.108866°E |
| 2,100 m (ca.) | Hochsölden | Alps | Austria | dead end | Sölden | Ski resort. The village is at 2,085 m. Asphalted road continues to Bergrestaurant Sonnblick at c. 2,100 m. | 46.976356°N 10.981920°E |
| 2,099 m | Weritzstafel | Alps | Switzerland | dead end | Wiler | See also nearby Lauchernalp, listed above. Crossing to these villages is at 1,871 m. | 46.421606°N 7.792638°E |
| 2,096 m | Thyon | Alps | Switzerland | dead end | Sion, via Hérémence | | 46°10′55″N 07°22′21″E |
| 2,094 m | Jaufenpass / Passo di Monte Giovo | Alps | Italy | pass | Sterzing/Vipiteno and Sankt Leonhard in Passerei/San Leonardo in Passiria | | 46.839441°N 11.321062°E |
| 2,093 m | Steilimigletscher | Alps | Switzerland | dead end | Hotel Steingletscher | Listed formerly as Steingletscher. Side road of 2.8 km from the Sustenpass road, from Hotel Steingletscher (alt. 1,863 m). Toll road for motorirized vehicles (5 SFr). Road has 3 steeper sections and it ends at a parking area (sign: Steilimigletscher 2095 m). Only hiking paths to the surrounding glaciers. | 46.71323°N 8.41642°E |
| 2,093 m | Plagne Aime 2000 | Alps | France | dead end (loop road) | Tarentaise, (Savoie) | Ski resort. Road D221 continues 2 km from Plagne Centre (1,970 m) to Aime 2000. Hors catégorie climb in the Tour de France. Note: From the roundabout in Plagne Centre at 1,965 m, another paved road, D223, goes past Plagne Villages at c. 2,050 m and continues to 2,140 m (45.503601°N 6.692349°E). Road D223 also has a side road of 0.6 km from c. 2,025 m to Plagne Soleil at 2,065 m. See also nearby Belle-Plagne, listed below. | 45.510438°N 6.666343°E |
| 2,087 m | La Saussaz | Alps | France | dead end | Saint-Martin-de-la-Porte | | 45.283746°N 6.473076°E |
| 2,083 m | Col du Mont Cenis | Alps | France | pass | Lanslebourg and Susa (Italy) | Possibly used by Hannibal. Hors catégorie climb in the Tour de France. Note that the pass is located c. 1 km north of Lac du Mont-Cenis, a big reservoir lake (dam altitude 1,979 m, height 95 m, length 1400 m). By the lake the road reaches higher, c. 2,090 m. See also nearby Col du Petit Mont Cenis, listed above. | 45.259721°N 6.901024°E |
| 2,080 m | Lac Rond & Lac Besson | Alps | France | dead end | Le Bourg-d'Oisans | Two adjoined lakes above l'Alpe d'Huez. | 45.116037°N 6.087120°E |
| 2,076 m | Champillon | Alps | Italy | dead end | Aosta, Aosta Valley | Side road from Great St Bernard Pass-road (SS27), via villages of Moulin and Doues. The asphalted road ends at a parking area. | 45.843470°N 7.287742°E |
| 2,076 m | Colle del Preit | Alps | Italy | pass | Ponte Marmora | Above this pass road turns into a gravel road (Maira-Stura-Kammstraße, MSKS), a high road of 14.7 km to Colle Valcavera, listed above. | 44.404391°N 7.041618°E |
| 2,075 m | Port de la Bonaigua / Pòrt dera Bonaigua | Pyrenees | Spain | pass | Vielha and Esterri d'Aneu | According to the Catalan map (ICGC), the height of the road reaches 2,075.8 m while the geographical pass is at 2,072.3 m. | 42°39′50″N 0°58′55″E |
| 2,070 m | Belle-Plagne | Alps | France | dead end | Tarentaise, (Savoie) | Ski resort. Side road D224 from the road to La Plagne (D221). 3.9 km from a roundabout at c. 1,885 m. Or only 3.6 km, if choosing a shortcut through Plagne Bellecôte at 1,910 m. See also nearby Plagne Aime 2000, listed above. | 45.509873°N 6.706458°E |
| 2,070 m | Martelltal / Val Martello | Alps | Italy | dead end | Coldrano, Martell | Pavement ends at a small parking area, highest point of the road is just before that. Gravel road continues to the closed and ruined Hotel Paradiso del Cevedale at 2,090 m. | 46°29′11″N 10°41′03″E |
| 2,070 m | R-285 Zelenchuksky District | Caucasus Mountains | Russia | dead end (to BTA-6 telescope) | Arkhyz (Russia) | | 43.6462°N 41.4412195°E |
| 2,070 m | Santuario Sant'Anna di Vinadio | Alps | Italy | dead end | Vinadio | Side road from Colle della Lombarda -road SP255 (from 1,815 m). Just before the Santuario (at 2,015 m), a side road of 0.6 km to a small crucifix at 2,070 m. | 44.227081°N 7.106313°E |
| 2,069 m | Mandelon | Alps | Switzerland | dead end | Sion, via Hérémence | | 46°07′52″N 07°24′41″E |
| 2,067 m | Col de la Croix de Fer | Alps | France | pass | Le Bourg-d'Oisans and Saint-Jean-de-Maurienne | Hors catégorie climb in the Tour de France | 45.2275°N 6.203333°E |
| 2,067 m | Parking Altumeira (Val Viola) | Alps | Italy | dead end | Arnoga | Side road from Passo del Foscagno -road (SS301), from "Curva Arnoga" at c. 1,880 m. For motorized vehicles, this is a toll road (5 €). The asphalted road ends after 4.3 km at P4 (parking area 4, Parking Altumeira) and gravel road continues to Rifugio Viola at 2,314 m. From nearby crossing, a poor gravel road leads to Passo di Val Viola and Swiss border at 2,470 m. | 46.438878°N 10.199305°E |
| 2,065 m | Passo del San Bernardino | Alps | Switzerland | pass | Thusis (Graubünden) and Bellinzona (Ticino) | | 46.496111°N 9.170833°E |
| 2,064 m | Alpe Campo | Alps | Switzerland | dead end | Sfazù | Side road from Passo del Bernina -road (from 1,622 m). | 46°24′05″N 10°07′07″E |
| 2,063 m | Els Cortals d'Encamp | Pyrenees | Andorra | dead end | Encamp | Road ends at a ski lift. | 42.539582°N 1.630912°E |
| 2,062 m | Rifugio Cornisello | Alps | Italy | dead end | Carisolo | Side road from Campo Carlo Magno -road (SS239) from 1,090 m. Paved road ends shortly before reaching the Rifugio Cornisello | 46°13′16″N 10°44′26″E |
| 2,060 m | Hotel Salastrains | Alps | Switzerland | dead end | St. Moritz | Paved road continues past Hotel Salastrains, to 2,060 m. Old height 2,049 means the roundabout just before the hotel. See also nearby Via Marguns etc. (Suvretta roads), listed below. | 46°29′58″N 09°49′43″E |
| 2,058 m | Belmeken Dam road | Rila | Bulgaria | pass | Road 8 via Sestrimo and Yundola | Part of the 2010 WRC Rally Bulgaria. Altitude of the Belmeken Dam is about 1,930 m. | 42.167449°N 23.825491°E |
| 2,058 m | Col du Lautaret | Alps | France | pass | Le Bourg-d'Oisans and Briançon | A famous climb on the Tour de France. From the pass the road leads also to Col du Galibier, listed above. | 45.035278°N 6.405556°E |
| 2,057 m | Passo di Fedaia | Alps | Italy | pass | Canazei and Rocca Pietore | a famous climb on the Giro d'Italia | 46°27′12.60″N 11°53′20.40″E |
| 2,055 m | Mangartska cesta (Mangart Road) | Alps | Slovenia | dead end (loop road) | Log pod Mangrtom and Lago del Predil | Side road from Passo di Predil road (from c. 1,090 m). Highest paved climb in Slovenia. Mangartsko sedlo (Mangart Saddle) is the name of the nearby pass (2,072 m). Mangart is the name of the nearby mountain (2,679 m). | 46.444051°N 13.640645°E |
| 2,052 m | Staller Sattel / Passo di Stalle | Alps | Austria; Italy | pass | Sankt Jakob in Defereggen valley (Tyrol) and Rasen-Antholz valley (South Tyrol) | | 46.888056°N 12.200556°E |
| 2,050 m | Parking de la Calme (Mollera dels Clots) | Pyrenees | France | dead end | Font-Romeu and Mont-Louis | Side road from road D618, from Col du Calvaire (alt. 1,830 m). Parking area for skiers and hikers. | 42.530089°N 2.021194°E |
| 2,050 m | Saint-Véran | Alps | France | dead end (loop road) | Château-Ville-Vieille | Saint-Véran is the third highest village in the Alps. There are also some side streets in the village, one of which (street name?) reaches c. 2,065 m. | 44.701669°N 6.866267°E |
| 2,050 m | Site de parapente du Pic dels Moros | Pyrenees | France | dead end | Targassonne | Steep access road to a paragliding site. From the main road D618 (roundabout at 1,589 m) choose the side road D618B. After 0.7 km (at 1,638 m) turn right to Rue du Berdaguer. After 0.9 km (at 1,680 m) a steep right turn to the 3.27 km/11.3 % access road, with a barrier very soon. The road has 5 steeper sections, some concrete-paved, length of each is 100–200 m. The steepest section is at least 20 %, after a short bridge at 1,865 m. The paved road ends at a small parking area. From there a sandy path of 0.23 km leads to the paragliding site at 2,060 m, with a beautiful scenery. | 42.510262°N 1.992485°E |
| 2,048 m | Moosalp | Alps | Switzerland | pass | Sion (via Stalden) and Bürchen | | 46°15′05″N 07°49′47″E |
| 2,047 m | Les Fonts | Alps | France | dead end | Cervières | Side road from Col d'Izoard -road (from c. 1,635 m). c. 3 km gravel just above Cervières (alt. 1,650 m). | 44.844111°N 6.816528°E |
| 2,047 m | Passo Manghen | Alps | Italy | pass | Borgo Valsugana and Molina di Fiemme | | 46.173279°N 11.441342°E |
| 2,046 m | Steinigboda | Alps | Switzerland | dead end | Nufenen | Side road from Passo del San Bernardino -road (from Nufenen at 1,570 m). The road ends at a cattle farm. | 46°33′17″N 09°14′31″E |
| 2,044 m | Oberalppass (Cuolm d'Ursera) | Alps | Switzerland | pass | Disentis, Graubünden and Andermatt, Canton of Uri | The Rhine springs from a source nearby (Tomasee) | 46.659°N 8.671°E |
| 2,043 m | Parcheggio di Cheneil | Alps | Italy | dead end | Paquier | Side road of 6.4 km from road SR46 (from 1,560 m). The asphalted road ends at a barrier above the parking area. Behind the barrier the road is concrete-paved for some hundred meters. Close to the barrier there is an inclined elevator (Ascensore inclinato Barma-Cheneil) which leads to the village of Cheneil (alt. 2,105 m, "about 8 residents"). | 45.866424°N 7.642165°E |
| 2,042 m | Estación de esquí de Boí Taüll | Pyrenees | Spain | dead end | Barruera, via Boí and Taüll | There are two barriers at 2,042 m. Behind the barrier the road descents to Boí Taüll ski resort at 2,035 m. Behind the other barrier the paved road ascents to 2,051 m. | 42.479264°N 0.867353°E |
| 2,042 m | Eisentalhöhe (Nockalmstraße) Schiestelscharte (Nockalmstraße) | Alps | Austria | pass | Innerkrems and Ebene Reichenau | For motorized vehicles, Nockalmstraße is a toll road. Its highest point, Eisentalhöhe at 2,042 m, is actually not a pass, but a high road past a nearby hill (Eisenthalhöhe 2,180 m). Schiestelscharte at 2,024 m, another high point, located 13 km south-east along the road, is a pass. It is also called Glockenhütte, which is the name of the restaurant/shop there. | Eisentalhöhe: 46.935687°N 13.759226°E Schiestelscharte: 46.89010°N 13.79459°E |
| 2,042 m | Transfăgărășan (Pasul Bâlea) | Carpathian Mountains | Romania | pass | Cârțișoara, Sibiu (Transylvania) and Arefu, Argeș (Wallachia) | Highest point is at the northern end of the 884 m long Bâlea Tunnel. Also an asphalted side road of 0.5 km to Cabana Bâlea Lac, located by Bâlea Lac (alt. 2,034 m). Highest point of the side road is 2,045 m, by Cabana Paltinu. (Also a short private road to Refugiul Salvamont, a mountain rescue center at 2,050 m.); The Transfăgărășan (road DN7C) was named the "Best Driving Road in the world" (Top Gear). | 45.602142°N 24.614221°E |
| 2,041 m | Puerto de la Ragua | Baetic System | Spain | pass | Cherín and La Calahorra | | 37.113166°N 3.029749°W |
| 2,040 m | Parking des Millefonts | Alps | France | dead end | Valdeblore | Side road from Col Saint-Martin -road M2565 (from c. 1,380 m). The paved road ends at a parking area. Lacs des Millefonts are five small lakes at an altitude of 2,230–2,380 m, along a hiking trail. | 44.098221°N 7.186230°E |
| 2,040 m | Via Marguns Via Clavadatsch Via Puzzainas Via Suvretta | Alps | Switzerland | dead end | St. Moritz, via Suvretta | Above Suvretta, there are 4 asphalted streets to at least 2,000 m (of these, only Via Suvretta is at least 1 km long): Via Marguns, dead end at 2,040 m.; Via Clavadatsch, dead end at 2,016 m.; Via Puzzainas, asphalted to 2,015 m and continues after a barrier as a gravel road to ski station Signal (2,130 m) and from there down to Hotel Salastrains, listed above.; Via Suvretta, asphalted to 2,004 m and continues as a gravel road/path towards the mountains (Pass Suvretta at 2,617 m). | Via Marguns: 46.489810°N 9.816390°E Via Clavadatsch: 46.491250°N 9.819870°E Via Puzzainas: 46.486280°N 9.811080°E Via Suvretta: 46.485300°N 9.806500°E |
| 2,039 m | Lai da Curnera | Alps | Switzerland | dead end | Surpalits | 4.5 km access road to the Lai da Curnera reservoir, from the Oberalppass road (from 1,830 m). Along the road, a barrier for motorirized vehicles. The highest point of the road is 0.9 km before the Lai da Curnera dam (alt. 1,958 m, height 153 m, length 350 m). | 46.63758°N 8.70751°E |
| 2,037 m | Bettmeralp Hotel Riederfurka (Fiescheralp) | Alps | Switzerland | dead end | Mörel | Bettmeralp, Riederalp and Fiescheralp are car-free resorts. Highest paved roads: Bettmeralp (2,037 m) is a cattle farm, located above Bettmersee (2,009 m) and Bettmeralp village (1,970 m).; Riederalp (1,905 m) village is generally located lower, but there is a steep concrete-paved road to near Hotel Riederfurka, to 2,064 m.; Nearby car-free resort Fiescheralp has a paved street through the village. The length of the street is c. 0.8 km, max elevation 2,215 m. To get there, take a cable car from Fiesch or path from Bettmeralp or gravel road above Lax. | Bettmeralp: 46°23′45″N 08°03′56″E Hotel Riederfurka: 46.377740°N 8.017990°E Fiescheralp: 46.412930°N 8.102930°E |
| 2,037 m | La Rabassa | Pyrenees | Andorra | dead end | Sant Julià de Lòria | At the top there is a big parking area, Naturlànd (eco park) and an animal park for kids. And ’Tobotronc’, the longest mountain coaster in the world (5.3 km). Nordic skiing area in the winter. | 42.435580°N 1.521315°E |
| 2,036 m | Bielerhöhe (Silvretta Hochalpenstraße) | Alps | Austria | pass | Montafon Vorarlberg) and Paznaun (Tyrol) | For motorized vehicles, this is a toll road. The original Bielerhöhe pass (2,021 m) has disappeared under the dam of the Silvretta Reservoir. | 46.918056°N 10.095556°E |
| 2,036 m | Puerto de Escúllar (Puerto Padilla) | Baetic System | Spain | pass | Caniles and Abla | There are two passes, 2,036 m and 1.2 km northwards 2,017 m (37.26276°N 2.78069°W). The latter is at the border of provinces of Almería and Granada. Between the passes, the road descends to c. 2,000 m. | 37.253328°N 2.774763°W |
| 2,035 m | Sestriere (Colle Sestriere) | Alps | Italy | pass | Pinerolo and Cesana Torinese | A starting and arrival point in the Giro d'Italia, sometimes also in the Tour de France. | 44.956836°N 6.879823°E |
| 2,035 m | Ventertal | Alps | Austria | dead end | Zwieselstein | From Vent, at c. 1,900 m, a narrow side road Rofenstraße. It reaches maximum at c. 2,035 m and then descents to hotel Rofenhöfe at 2,014 m. | 46.857048°N 10.894255°E |
| 2,033 m | Kurzras / Maso Corto (Schnalstal / Val Senales) | Alps | Italy | dead end | Naturns / Naturno | End of LS/SP3. Ski resort and hiking area. | 46.758300°N 10.780618°E |
| 2,033 m | Pro da Peadra | Alps | Switzerland | dead end | Zillis, via Mathon | Asphalted road ends at Mursenas (alt. 1,931 m). 0.2 km before that (from 1,921 m), a concrete-paved road of 1.4 km to pasture land. | 46.64864°N 9.39710°E |
| 2,032 m | Passo Valles | Alps | Italy | pass | Paneveggio and Falcade | | 46.338604°N 11.800845°E |
| 2,027 m | l'Ecot (Hameau de l'Ecot) | Alps | France | dead end | Bonneval-sur-Arc | Side road from Col de l'Iseran -road, from c. 1,800 m. | 45.380828°N 7.089425°E |
| 2,027 m | Schreckfeld | Alps | Switzerland | dead end | Grindelwald | Not for motorirized vehicles (except for authorized). From Grindelwald, road towards Grosse Scheidegg pass. At 1,160 m turn left to Regenmattenstrasse (1.3 km), at 1,290 m turn right to Alpweg (steep, 4.4 km/14.7 %), at 1,935 m turn left (1.1 km). More popular access via Grosse Scheidegg (1,962 m) but after that there are 4 gravel sections. From the highest asphalted point a gravel road 1.5 km to First ski station at 2,165 m. | 46.66200°N 8.06223°E |
| 2,025 m | Parking de Laval (Vallée de la Clarée) | Alps | France | dead end | Névache | | 45.059362°N 6.525588°E |
| 2,025 m | Puig de la Tossa | Pyrenees | France | dead end | La Llagonne | Side road of 4.4 km from road D4C (from 1,795 m), via Coll de Brilles at 1,965 m. Last 150 m the road is gravel, to old army barracks at 2,034 m. The road goes past an army shooting area, thus there are restrictions for entering the area. There is a timetable sign at the beginning of the road. | 42.530497°N 2.151362°E |
| 2,023 m | Kreuztal / Valcroce | Alps | Italy | dead end | Brixen / Bressanone | Side road from Würzjoch / Passo delle Erbe -road SP29 (from 1,688 m). Gravel road (Dolomiten Panoramaweg) continues to Plosehütte at c. 2,450 m and near Telegraph Plose at 2,486 m. | 46.683249°N 11.711859°E |
| 2,020 m | Lai da Vons | Alps | Switzerland | dead end | Sufers | Along the road, 1 tunnel (90 m) and 2 gravel sections (0.4 & 0.1 km). Asphalted road ends above lake Lai da Vons (alt. 1,991 m). Gravel road continues 0.65 km to an unnamed(?) pass at 2,073 m, descending then towards Andeer. | 46.58758°N 9.38270°E |
| 2,020 m | Zillertaler Höhenstraße (Melchboden) | Alps | Austria | pass | Hippach and either Zellberg, Aschau in Zillertal, Ried in Zillertal or Kaltenbach depending on the variant you choose | For motorized vehicles, this is a toll road. The highest point of the road is 250 m from restaurant/Alpengasthof Melchboden. Also, name Arbiskopf seems to be used, but actually it is the name of a nearby grassy hill (2,133 m). | 47.220667°N 11.824915°E |
| 2,017 m | Kühtaisattel | Alps | Austria | pass | Ötz and Gries im Sellrain | Ski resort. | 47.2161°N 11.0303°E |
| 2,016 m | Circuit de l'Authion | Alps | France | dead end (loop road) | Col de Turini | Side road D68 from Col de Turini (1,604 m). The road becomes a one-way loop road (9 km) at Baisse de Tueis (1,889 m). The highest point of the loop road is near the Redoute des Trois Communes, 0.7 km from an unnamed(?) pass at 1,986 m. The lowest point is at c. 1,780 m. The area has some war history, see Battle of Authion. | 43.998070°N 7.427783°E |
| 2,014 m | Lac des Bouillouses | Pyrenees | France | dead end | La Llagonne and Mont-Louis | Side road D60 from road D118, to a reservoir lake. By 2 km of the road, there is a toll station for motorized vehicles and a parking area for those who rather want to use a shuttle bus. By 7.7 km the road becomes narrower. Asphalted road ends just before the lake, by Auberge du Carlit. Parking areas are lower, at c. 2,005 m. Dam is at 2,017 m (length 380 m), water level is at 2,016 m. | 42.560037°N 2.003775°E |
| 2,012 m | Parking les Claux (Vallon du Cristillan) | Alps | France | dead end | Maison du Roi, via Ceillac | Asphalted road ends at a small parking area. | 44.659291°N 6.843485°E |
| 2,012 m | Pian del Re | Alps | Italy | dead end | Paesana | Source of river Po is there. | 44.700868°N 7.096274°E |
| 2,012 m | Plan-d'Amont | Alps | France | dead end | Aussois | Access road to two reservoir lakes, Plan-d'Aval and Plan-d'Amont. Road becomes gravel at 2,012 m, already by the first lake (Plan-d'Aval). Plan-d'Aval dam is at 1,948 m (side road downwards), Plan d'Amont dam is at 2,078 m (height 47 m, length 345 m). Gravel road continues to c. 2,200 m. | 45.249680°N 6.726475°E |
| 2,011 m | Mittler Hütte | Alps | Switzerland | dead end | Chur, via Arosa | | 46°47′11″N 09°39′45″E |
| 2,008 m | Courchevel Altiport | Alps | France | dead end | Moûtiers | Small airport, infamous for its short and steep (18%) runway. | 45.395992°N 6.634244°E |
| 2,006 m | Breuil-Cervinia | Alps | Italy | dead end | Châtillon | Italian name is Cervinia, French name is Breuil, commercial name is Breuil-Cervinia. In the area, there are several asphalted streets above 2,000 m, of which the highest reach: Strada per Cielo Alto c. 2,170 m; Via Giomein c. 2,140 m; Segnavia 13EE c. 2,120 m. This road has a barrier at the beginning, and continues as a gravel road to Rifugio Duca degli Abruzzi all'Oriondé at 2,802 m.; From the village and from Via Giomein diverts a gravel maintenance road, past several ski lifts, to Rifugio Teodulo at 3,317 m and past it to Bontadini-Lift at 3,332 m (45.944901°N 7.708604°E). This is the highest road in the Alps but because of the maximum steepness of c. 30 % a suitable vehicle is needed. | 45°56′54″N 07°37′52″E |
| 2,006 m | Simplonpass / Passo del Sempione | Alps | Switzerland | pass | Brig, Switzerland and Domodossola, Piedmont | Road E62, the highest point of the European route network in Europe. From near the pass, a paved narrow side road (Bergalpenstrasse + Eistenstrasse) of 1.5 km to Hopsche (2,038 m), with a group of houses (46.250852°N 8.020779°E). | 46.251667°N 8.033333°E |
| 2,004 m | Dürrboden (Dischmatal) | Alps | Switzerland | dead end | Davos | | 46°43′17″N 09°55′19″E |
| 2,004 m | Zischgalm | Alps | Italy | pass | Tesero and Obereggen | Official name? Zischgalm is the name of the restaurant/bar/pension near the highest asphalted point. The height of the geographical pass is 1,996 m, named Reiterjoch / Passo Pampeago. From there, the road gradually ascends to Zischgalm (c. 800 m from the pass). Last part of the road was asphalted in 2012 (from Pampeago village to Zischgalm), for Giro d'Italia. | 46.349506°N 11.548081°E |
| 2,004 m | Alpe di Cava | Alps | Switzerland | dead end | Malvaglia | Along the road, downhill from 1,330 m to 1,215 m. After that, c. 2.5 km gravel to 1,460 m. Road ends at a cattle farm, a gate at 2,004 m. | 46°21′35″N 09°02′01″E |
| 2,003 m | Pian Geirett (Val Camadra) | Alps | Switzerland | dead end | Campo Blenio | Side road from Passo del Lucomagno -road (from c. 950 m). | 46°36′16″N 08°56′04″E |
| 2,001 m | Col de Pailhères | Pyrenees | France | pass | Mijanès and Ax-les-Thermes | Hors catégorie climb in the Tour de France. About the name: PORT de Pailhères is a grassy pass at c. 1,970 m (with no road to the valley on the eastern side). Paved road turns there to northeast (if coming from west), towards the nearby COL de Pailhères. | 42.733647°N 1.992681°E |
| 2,001 m | Fideriser Heuberge (Berghaus Arflina) | Alps | Switzerland | dead end | Fideris | | 46°51′59″N 09°43′32″E |

== Highest controlled-access highways ==
| Elevation | Name | Mountains | Country | Type | Between | Remarks | Highest point |
|---|---|---|---|---|---|---|---|
| 1,631 m | A13 San Bernardino Tunnel | Alps | Switzerland | tunnel | Chur – Bellinzona | only one lane in each direction, both lanes in one tube | 46°27′53″N 09°11′08″E |
| 1,440 m | A-1 Puerto de Somosierra | Central System | Spain | pass | Madrid – Burgos | | |
| 1,395 m | Mont Blanc Tunnel | Alps | France; Italy | tunnel | Chamonix – Courmayeur | only one lane in each direction, both lanes in one tube | 45.854°N 6.914°E |
| 1,370 m | Brenner motorway | Alps | Austria; Italy | pass | Innsbruck – Bolzano | | 47°00′12″N 11°30′27″E |
| 1,340 m | A10 Tauern Tunnel | Alps | Austria | tunnel | Salzburg – Villach | | 47°10′55″N 13°26′19″E |
| 1,340 m | A-52 es:Puerto de Padornelo | Galician Massif | Spain | pass | Verín – Benavente | | |
| 1,320 m | S16 Arlberg Tunnel | Alps | Austria | tunnel | Bregenz – Innsbruck | only one lane in each direction, both lanes in one tube | 47°07′22″N 10°15′23″E |
| c. 1,300 m | AP-6 es:Túnel de carretera de Guadarrama | Central System | Spain | tunnel | Collado Villalba – Villacastín | | |
| 1,297 m | Frejus Tunnel | Alps | France; Italy | tunnel | Modane – Bardonecchia | only one lane in each direction, both lanes in one tube | |
| 1,282 m | A-23 es:Puerto de Monrepós | Pyrenees | Spain | pass | es:Arguís and es:Escusaguas | | |
| c. 1,250 m | AP-61, El Portachuelo, Los Ángeles de San Rafael | Central System | Spain | pass | Segovia – San Rafael | | |
| 1,229 m | AP-66 Negrón Tunnel | Cantabrian Mountains | Spain | tunnel | Campomanes – León | | |
| 1,222 m | A-6 Puerto de Manzanal | Galician Massif | Spain | pass | Astorga – Ponferrada | | |
| c. 1,200 m | AP-51 | Central System | Spain | | Ávila – Villacastín | | |
| 1,175 m | A2 Gotthard Tunnel | Alps | Switzerland | tunnel | Altdorf – Airolo | only one lane in each direction, both lanes in one tube | 46°31′40″N 08°36′01″E |
| 1,150 m | E7 es:Túnel de Somport | Pyrenees | Spain; France | tunnel | Canfranc – fr:Urdos | only one lane in each direction, both lanes in one tube | |
| 1,121 m | A75 Col des Issartets | Massif Central | France | pass | Saint-Flour – Massiac | Highest motorway pass in France | |
| 1,113 m | A24 Roma-Teramo Valico di Monte San Rocco | Apennines | Italy | pass | Roma – Alba Adriatica | | |
| 1,070 m | A24 near Vila Pouca de Aguiar | Serra do Marão | Portugal | | Vila Pouca de Aguiar – Vila Real, Portugal | Highest motorway in Portugal | |
| 1,060 m | A2 Kalcherkogeltunnel (near Pack Saddle) | Alps | Austria | tunnel | Klagenfurt – Graz | | |
| 1,050 m | J20 Vue des Alpes Tunnel | Jura Mountains | Switzerland | tunnel | Neuchâtel – La Chaux-de-Fonds | only one lane in each direction, both lanes in one tube | 47°05′03″N 06°51′55″E |
| 1,016 m | A2 Salerno-Reggio Calabria Teramo Valico Campotenese | Apennines | Italy | pass | Salerno – Reggio Calabria | | |

== See also ==
- Extreme points of Europe
- List of highest paved roads in Europe by country
  - List of highest paved roads in Switzerland
- List of highest points reached in the Tour de France
- List of highest railways in Europe
- List of mountain passes
- Principal passes of the Alps
- Transport in Europe
- Gobba di Rollin – highest location in Europe reached by 4x4 vehicles
