= Perchau Saddle =

Perchau Saddle (Perchauer Sattel)
- Location within Alps
- Elevation: 995 metres (3,264 ft)

Third Approach
- Location: Austria
- Range: Alps
- Coordinates: 47°06′37″N 14°27′28″E

The Perchau Saddle (German: Perchauer Sattel, el. 995 m.) is a high mountain pass in the Austrian Alps in the Bundesland of Styria.

== See also ==
- List of highest paved roads in Europe
- List of mountain passes
