= Gepatschspeicher =

- Location within Austria Location within Tyrol, Austria
- Location: Tyrol, Austria
- Coordinates: 46°55′52″N 10°44′29″E
- Type: lake

Gepatschspeicher is an artificial lake of Tyrol, Austria. It feeds a pumped storage hydropower plant built in 1961-64 with 395 MW power in the town of Prutz at the Inn river.

The artificial dam of about 160 metres height and 600 m length is located in the upper Kaunertal valley under the Kaunertal glacier and the water is fed to the power plant through a tunnel of 13 km length and a height difference over 800 m. Through a tunnel the lake also takes water from the neighbouring parallel valley Pitztal.

There is a tourist route along the lake.
