= Plose =

Mountain in Northern Italy

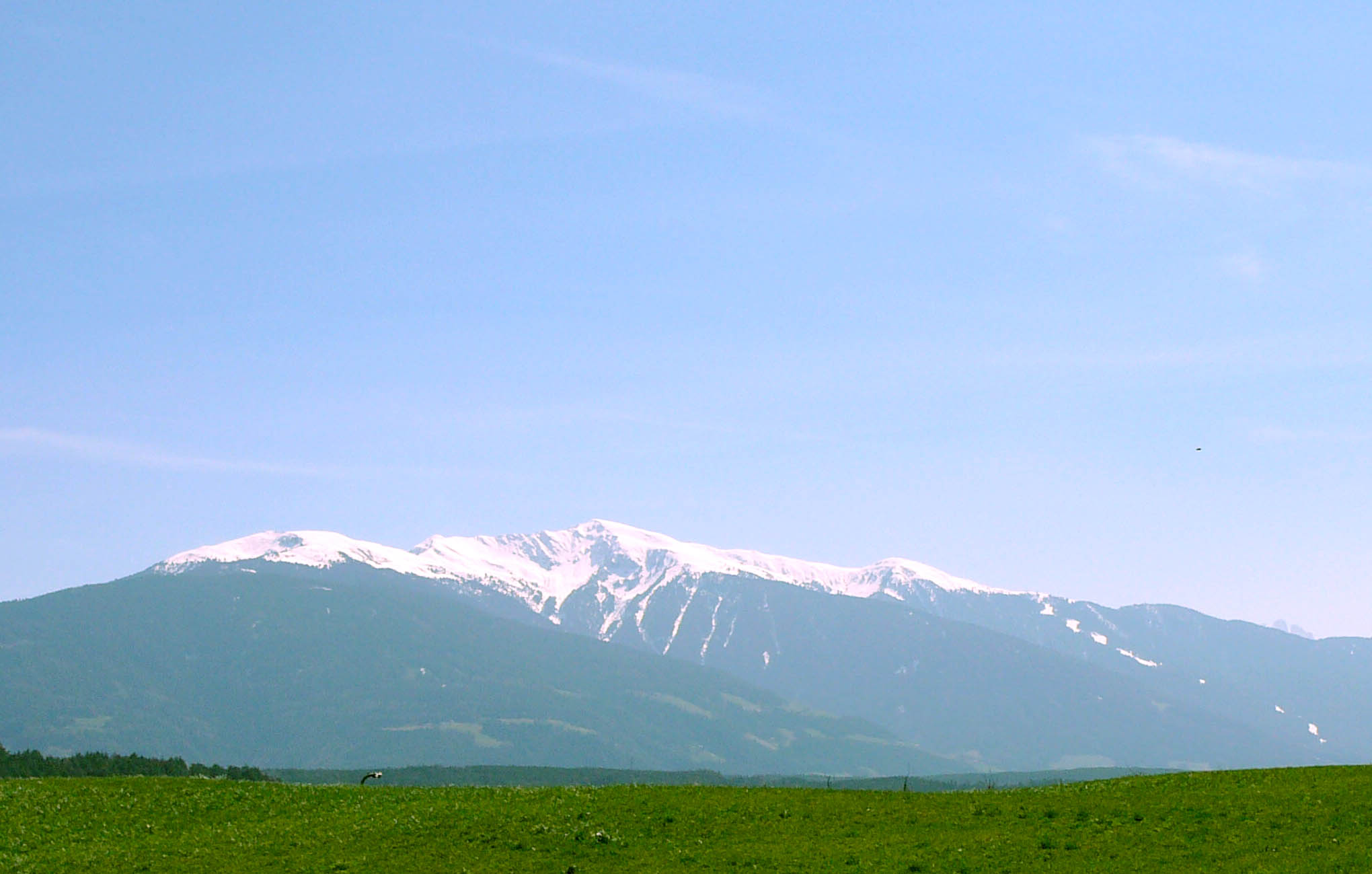

Highest point
- Elevation: 2,562 m (8,406 ft)
- Listing: Alpine mountains 2500–2999 m
- Coordinates: 46°41′44″N 11°44′0″E

Geography
- Location: South Tyrol, Italy
- Parent range: Lüsner Mountains, Dolomites

The Plose is a massif with several peaks near Brixen in South Tyrol, Italy. Its peaks are: Telegraph (2,486 m s.l.m.), Pfannspitze (2,547 m s.l.m.) and Gabler (2,576 m s.l.m.). It is bordered by the Eisacktal to the west, the Lüsner Valley to the north and east and the Aferer Valley as well as the Würzjoch to the south.

Due to its gentle slopes, the Plose is suitable for skiing and has been made accessible through numerous cableway systems.

== Toponym ==
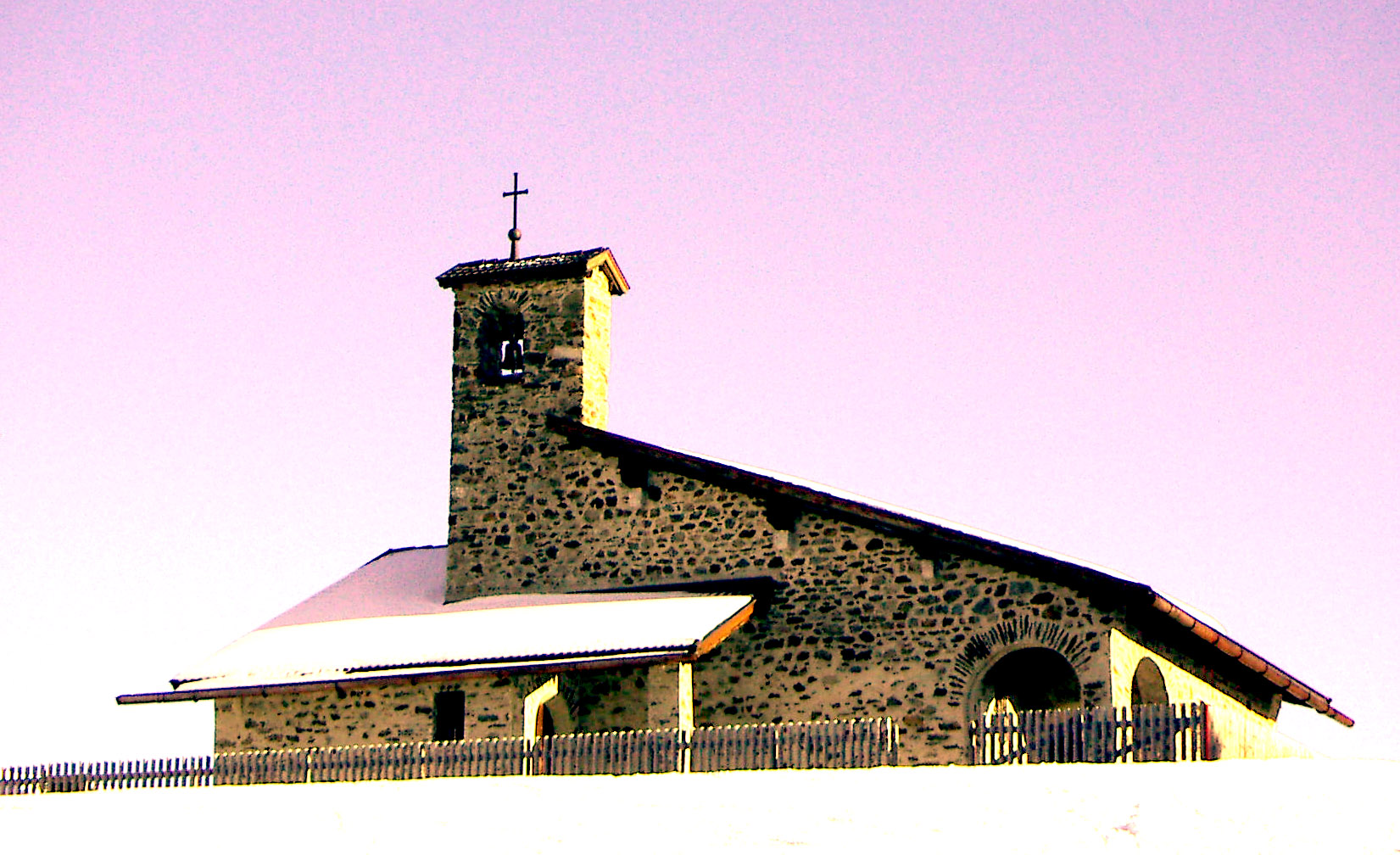
The chapel at Valcroce, Plose

The mountains name "Plose" has already been attributed in 1501, in 1574 as Plosse ein hocher Spitz, in 1613 as Plosser Alben and in 1840 as Plosenberg. The name probably derives from the etymology of the pre-roman blese (steep lawn). It is one of the few toponyms, which are written and pronounced the same way in Italian, as it is in German.

== History ==
In 1920 the first refuge was built at Kreuztal (2,050 m a.s.l.).

A first project to connect the Plose to Brixen took place in 1910. It was a cable car Ceretti-Tanfani-Strub, which was able to carry 15 people plus the driver. It was later decided to give the job to Bleichert, but this project was also covered up for financial reasons. The project was completed in 1963. In fact, as early as 1950 there was a first plant at the Skihütte, built by the Kahl-Tinkhauser family. Later other facilities were opened, such as the Ladurnerlift in 1956 and another in 1959. In 1965 a basket plant was erected, able to connect Valcroce to the top of Mount Plose.

The operation of the cable car from Milland (a district of Brixen) to Sankt Andrä and from there to Kreuztal took place in 1964. The plant remained in operation until the 1985/86 season, when it was closed as obsolete. Since the mid-eighties there is a new cable car that leads to Kreuztal starting near the village of Sankt Andrä. The connection from Brixen to the cable car downstream of Sankt Andrä was replaced by a ski bus. All the ski slopes are part of the much larger Dolomiti Superski ski area.

During the winter season of 2010/11, a new 6-seater chairlift was built to replace the previous, 3-seater. This new lift on the Rossalm chairlift allows for easier and faster ascent.

Recently, between 2012 and 2013, the City Council of Brixen, together with the provincial council, discussed the possibility of building a new cable car, but no solution has yet been found on the starting point.

== Activities ==
=== Funpark ===
Next to the Schönboden ski lift (4-seater chair lift) the Double fun-Funpark Plose has been installed, which includes washboards, slides, jumps, funboxes and table tops.

=== Slip ===
In 2009, next to the Trametsch slope, the 11.7 kilometre long Rudirun toboggan run was opened, the longest toboggan run in South Tyrol. The track starts from Kreuztal and, through a medium difficulty route and a difference in altitude of about 1000 meters, it reaches the valley near the departure of the gondola lift of Sankt Andrä. You can also stop after the first 5.2 km, to climb again, taking the chairlift.

The toboggan run from the Rossalm hut to Kreuztal is shorter and simpler.

=== Paragliding ===
There are three points where paragliding is possible: from the top of the Plose (2,486 m), from the Giogo Bello (2,301 m) and near Valcroce (a little further north).

=== Ski lifts ===
There are 10 lifts, of which:

• 1 ski lift: Randötsch (since 1996), Heini (no longer exists);

• 7 chairlifts:

o Schönboden: four-seater since 1998, previously three-seater;

o Trametsch: 4 places since 2004, before there was a ski lift;

o CAI Refuge: 3 places since 1986;

o Rossalm: 6 seats since 2010, previously 3 seats;

o Skihütte: 2 3-seater chairlifts since 1998, previously there was only one-seater chairlift;

o Pfannspitze: 3 seats since 1998;

o Palmschoß: two-seater since 1973;

• 1 cable car: Plose cable car (6 seats, 1985)

=== Tracks ===
There are 42 km of slopes, of which

- difficult (black): 9
- averages (red): 22
- easy (blue): 11

There are a total of 23 kilometres of cross-country skiing trails. Other facilities include:

- 11.7 km "Rudirun" toboggan run
- horse-drawn sleigh run

== Gallery ==
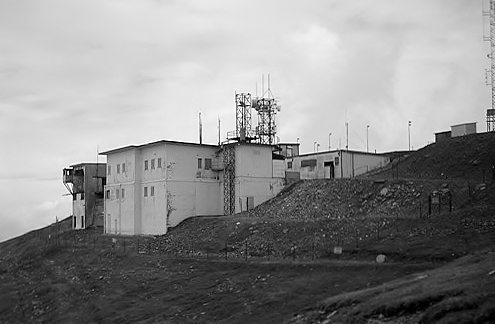
The old Air force base Plose

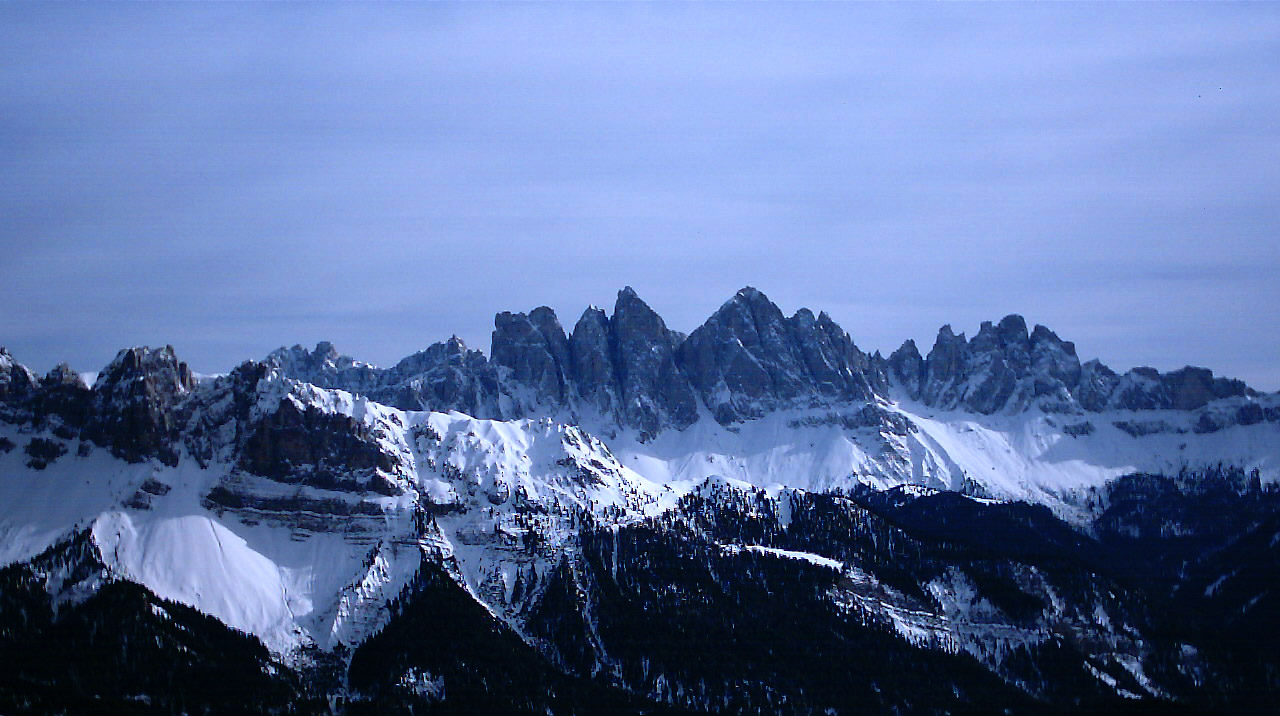
The Geisler, view from Plose
