= Ried im Oberinntal =

Municipality in Tyrol, Austria

- Municipality
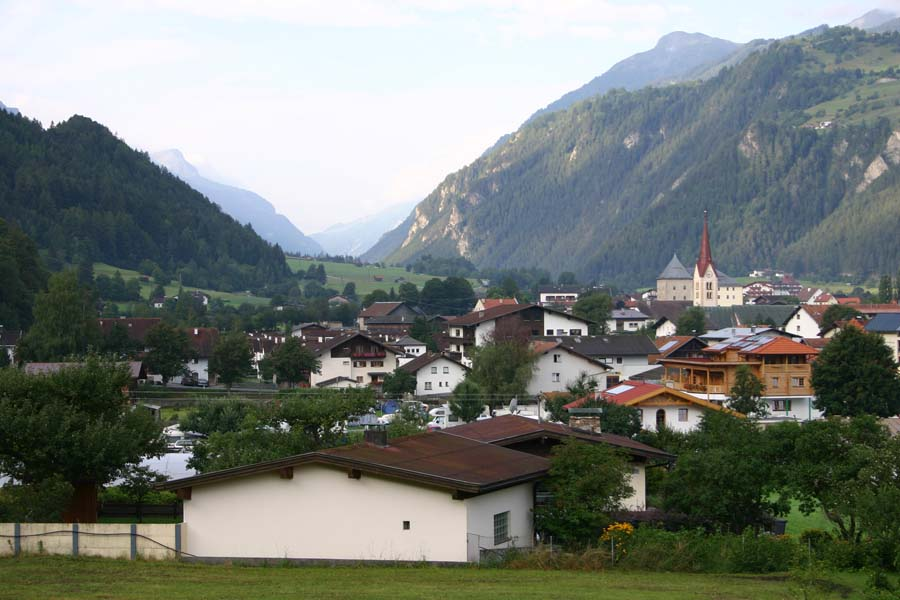

- Coat of arms

- Location within Austria
- Coordinates: 47°03′19″N 10°39′16″E
- Country: Austria
- State: Tyrol
- District: Landeck

Government
  - Mayor: Elmar Handle

Area
  - Total: 27.45 km^{2} (10.60 sq mi)
- Elevation: 876 m (2,874 ft)

Population (2021)
  - Total: 1,250
  - Density: 45.5/km^{2} (118/sq mi)
- Time zone: UTC+1 (CET)
  - Summer (DST): UTC+2 (CEST)
- Postal code: 6531
- Area code: 05472
- Vehicle registration: LA
- Website: http://www.ried-oberinntal.tirol.gv.at

Ried im Oberinntal is a municipality in the district of Landeck in the Austrian state of Tyrol located 12 km south of the city of Landeck and 3 km below Prutz. It was first mentioned in documents in the 12th century. Tourism is the main source of income.
