= Refuge du Plan du Lac =

Mountain hut in France

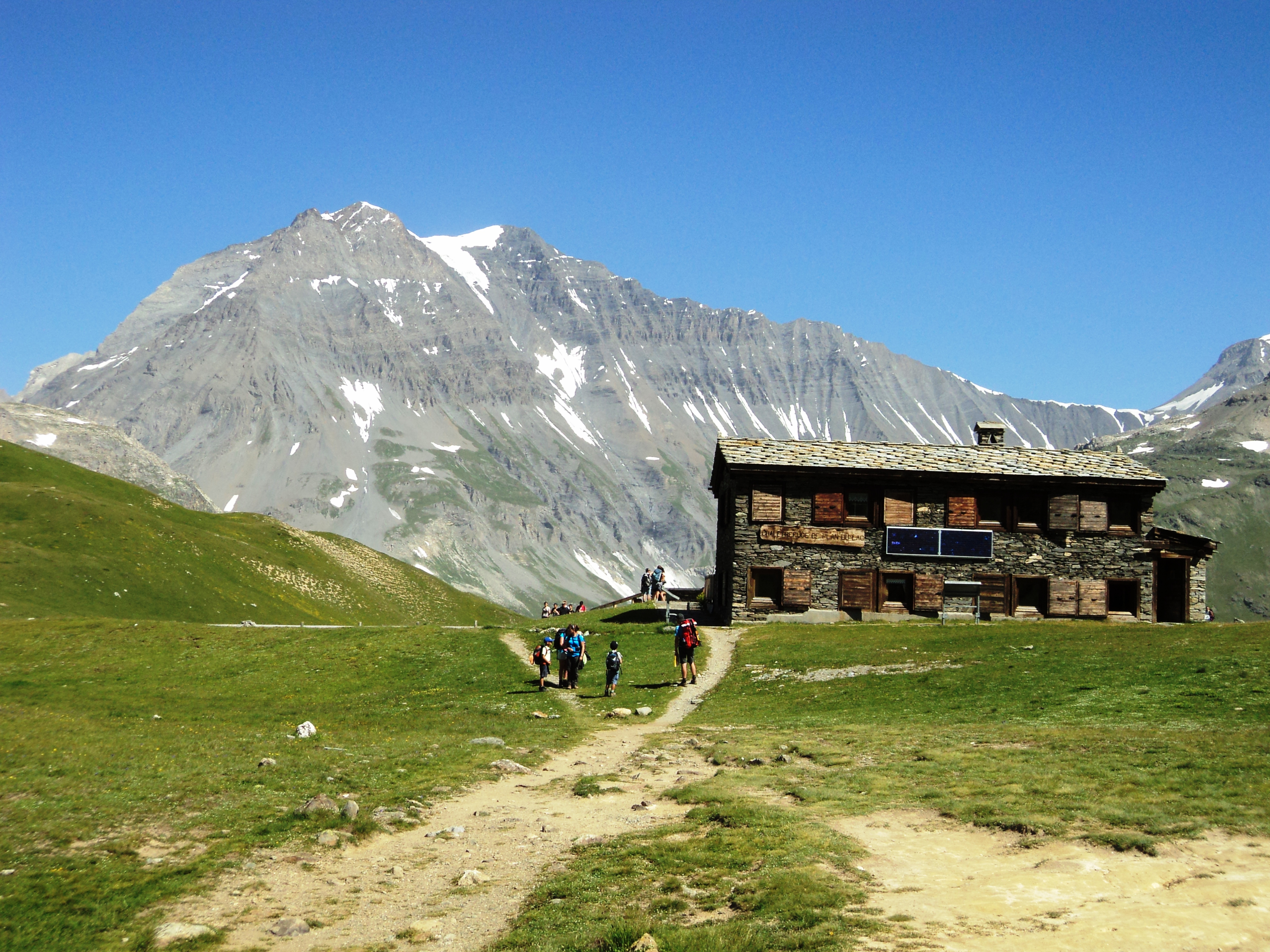
- Refuge du Plan du Lac
- Interactive map of the Refuge du Plan du Lac area

General information
- Type: Mountain refuge
- Location: Alps, France
- Coordinates: 45°20′44″N 6°50′15″E

Refuge du Plan du Lac is a refuge in the Alps.
