= Lac Besson =

Lake in France

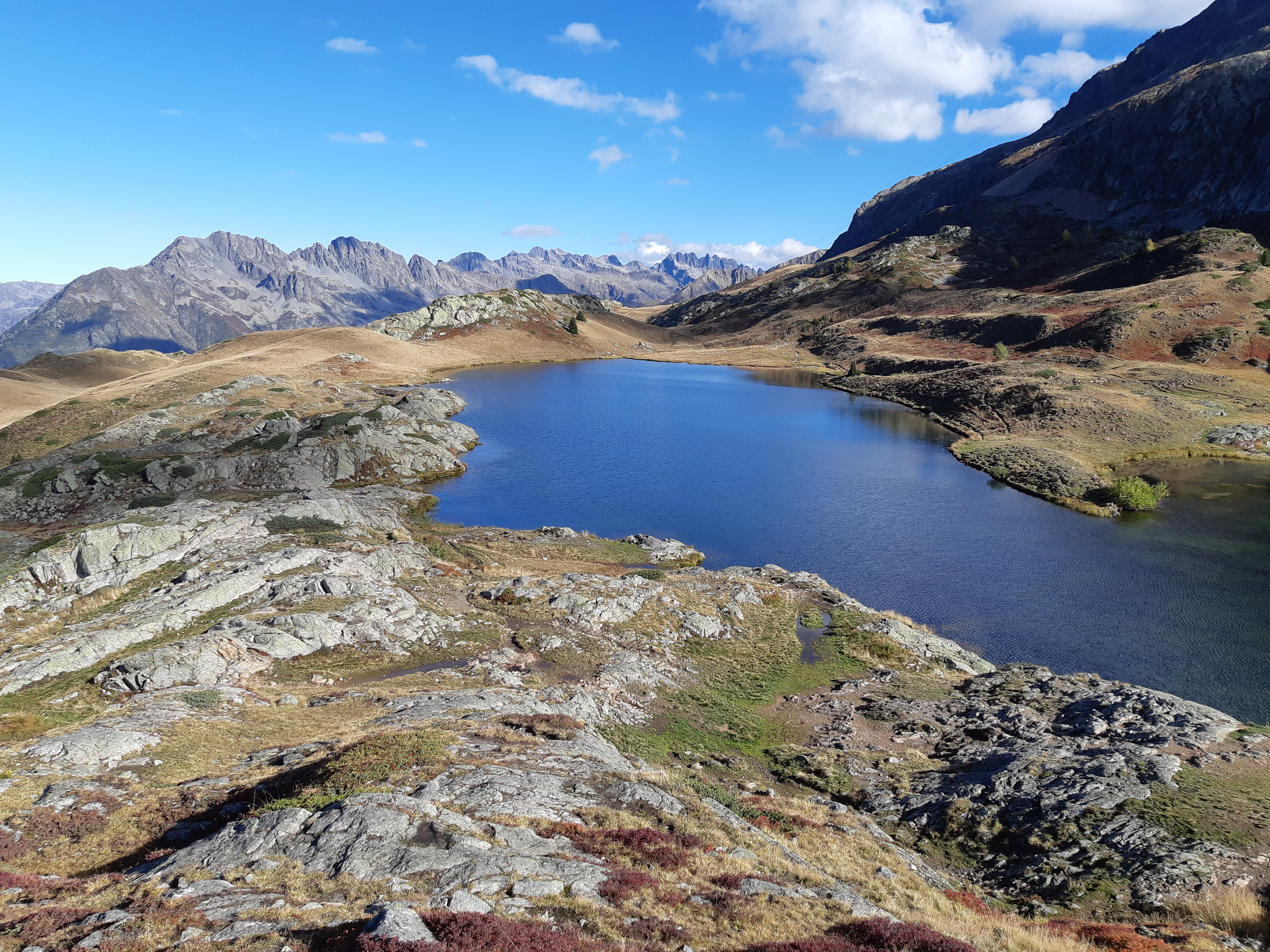
- Lac Besson in October 2018.

- Location within France
- Location: Isère
- Coordinates: 45°7′5″N 6°5′15″E
- Primary outflows: Eau d'Olle
- Basin countries: France
- Surface elevation: 2,060 m (6,760 ft)

Lac Besson is a lake in Isère, France.
