= Selva di Cadore =

- Comune
- Comune di Selva di Cadore
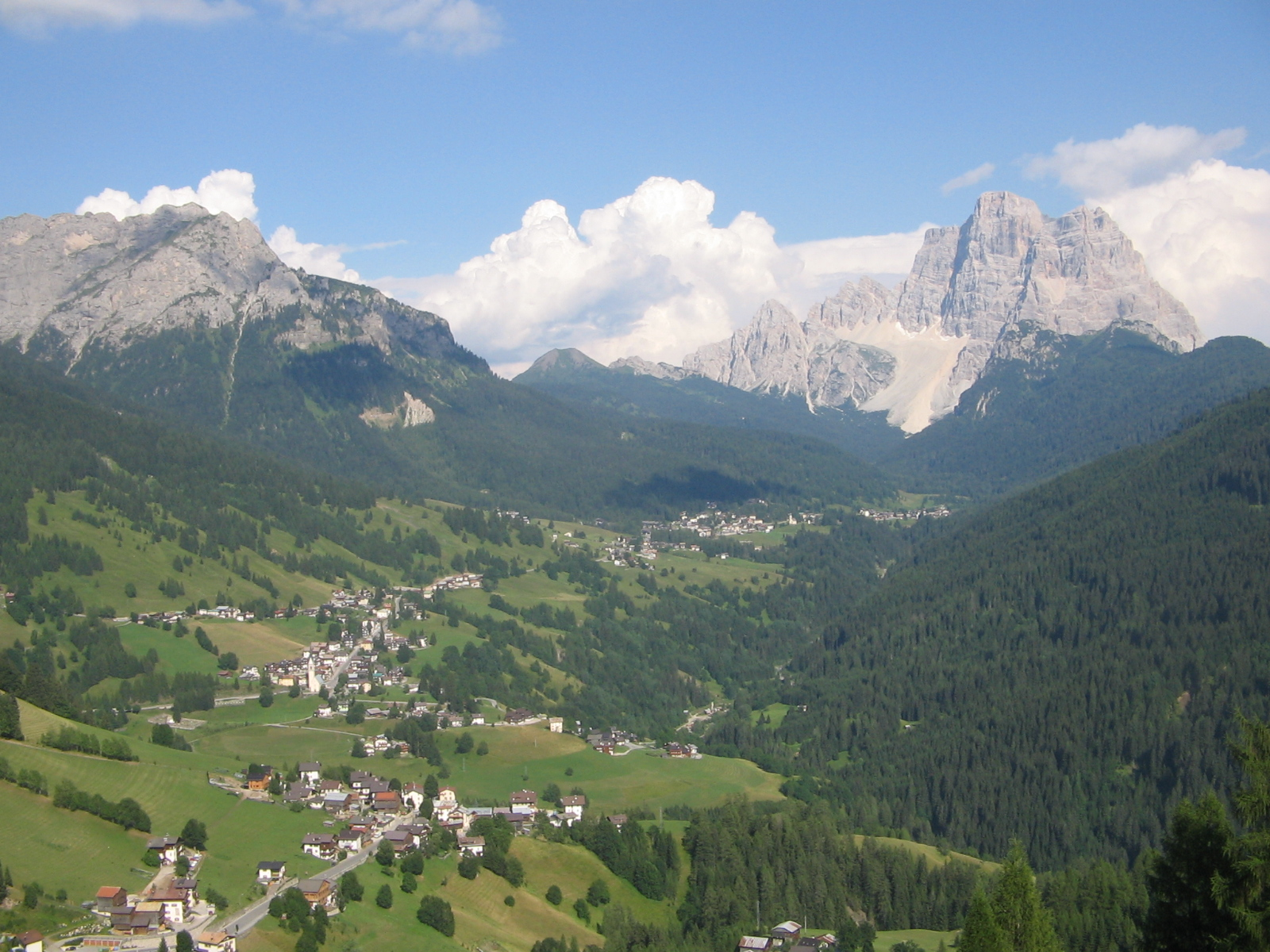

- Location within Italy Location within Veneto
- Coordinates: 46°27′N 12°2′E
- Country: Italy
- Region: Veneto
- Province: Province of Belluno (BL)
- Frazioni: S.Fosca, Pescul

Area
  - Total: 33.1 km^{2} (12.8 sq mi)
- Elevation: 1,350 m (4,430 ft)

Population (Dec. 2004)
  - Total: 557
  - Density: 16.8/km^{2} (43.6/sq mi)
- Demonym: Selvani
- Time zone: UTC+1 (CET)
  - Summer (DST): UTC+2 (CEST)
- Postal code: 32020
- Dialing code: 0437

Selva di Cadore (ladin: Selva de Ciadore or Selva) is a comune (municipality) in the province of Belluno in the Italian region of Veneto, located about 120 kilometres (75 mi) north of Venice and about 40 kilometres (25 mi) northwest of Belluno. As of 31 December 2004, it had a population of 557 and an area of 33.1 square kilometres (12.8 mi^{2}). The population speaks the so called Ladin Venetian that is heavily influenced by the Ladin language.

The municipality of Selva di Cadore contains the frazioni (subdivisions, mainly villages and hamlets) S.Fosca and Pescul.

Selva di Cadore borders the following municipalities: Alleghe, Borca di Cadore, Colle Santa Lucia, San Vito di Cadore, Zoldo Alto.

Located in Val Fiorentina, in the upper Agordino area, the locality is a popular tourist destination year-round. The Monte Fertazza ski lifts, departing from Pescul, provide access in both summer and winter to the scenic summit of Monte Fertazza (2,101 m), offering panoramic views of the UNESCO World Heritage Dolomites, including Monte Civetta, Monte Pelmo, Monte Antelao, and the Marmolada. The lifts are connected to the ski slopes of Alleghe and Val di Zoldo, forming part of the larger Ski Civetta area, which is integrated into the Dolomiti Superski network.

== Ski Civetta ==
Ski Civetta is a ski area located in the Dolomites, northeastern Italy. It was established in 1982 by connecting the ski facilities of Selva di Cadore, which had been operational since 1978, with the ski resorts of Alleghe and Zoldo. Since the 1993/94 winter season, Ski Civetta has been part of the Dolomiti Superski network.

The ski area offers approximately 80 kilometers of slopes served by a total of 25 lifts, connecting the villages of Alleghe, Selva di Cadore, and Palafavera in Val di Zoldo during both the winter and summer seasons.

=== Selva di Cadore Sector ===
The Selva di Cadore side of the ski area extends along the slopes of Monte Fertazza (2,101 m), the highest point of the resort. This sector includes the following ski runs:

- Salere (21): A red (intermediate) run starting from the top of Monte Fertazza down to the village of Pescul. The run offers panoramic views and is approximately 3.5 km long with a vertical drop of 700 meters. It is served by the Pescul–Fertazza chairlift (11) and the Fertazza chairlift (13).
- Fertazza (23): A red run, about 1 km long and fairly wide. It is served by the Fertazza chairlift (13).
- Le Ciaune (22): A blue (easy) run, approximately 1 km long, also served by the Fertazza chairlift (13). It is suitable for beginners.
- Bait (29): A red technical run that descends through the forest to the village of Pescul. It is served by the Pescul–Fertazza chairlift (11). When combined with the Fertazza (23) run, it offers a continuous descent of about 700 meters in vertical drop.
- Forcella Pecol 1 & 2 (26): Blue runs served by the Lastie ski lift (14). These offer panoramic views of the Sella group.
- Fontana Fredda (27): A blue run served by the Rio Canedo ski lift (16), which also functions as a connection to the Alleghe side of the resort.
- Campo Scuola Santa Fosca (28): A blue run located in the village of Santa Fosca, serving as a beginner area. It is equipped with the Santa Fosca ski lift (17).

=== Summer Activities ===
During the summer months, the Pescul–Fertazza (11) and Fertazza (13) chairlifts remain operational, allowing visitors to access mountain huts and a panoramic viewpoint located at the summit of Monte Fertazza (2,101 m), part of the UNESCO World Heritage Dolomites.

== Demographic evolution ==
Historical population

Year	Pop.	±%
1861	?	—
1871	1,037	—
1881	878	−15.3%
1901	952	+8.4%
1911	940	−1.3%

Year	Pop.	±%
1921	932	−0.9%
1931	870	−6.7%
1936	763	−12.3%
1951	729	−4.5%
1961	748	+2.6%

Year	Pop.	±%
1971	617	−17.5%
1981	586	−5.0%
1991	604	+3.1%
2001	563	−6.8%

Source: Data from ISTAT
