= Dolomiti Superski =

Italian ski area

- The Langkofel Group in Val Gardena

- Location within Alps
- Location: Dolomites, Italy
- Nearest city: Cortina D'Ampezzo
- Coordinates: 46°34′N 11°39′E
- Top elevation: 3,269 m (10,725 ft)
- Skiable area: 1,246 km (774 mi) of runs 29,652 acres (120.00 km^{2})
- Trails: 887
- Lift system: 450 total
- Snowmaking: 1,160 kilometers (97% of slopes)
- Website: www.dolomitisuperski.com

The Dolomiti Superski is a ski area in Italy. Created in 1974, it is spread over an area of about 3,000 km^{2} in the North-East of Italy, and includes most of the winter ski slopes of the Dolomites. Comprising 12 ski resorts and a total of 1,246 km of slopes, it is the largest ski area in the world. It regularly hosts World Cup alpine skiing and snowboarding races.

It offers 450 ski lifts and 1,246 kilometers of slopes, about half of which are directly connected to each other, and all of which can be used with a single ski pass. About 1,160 kilometers of slopes (97%) are covered by snowmaking and skiability is guaranteed from December to April even without snowfall. It reaches an altitude of 3,269 meters in the Arabba/Marmolada area. It is located on the Dolomite mountains, which were declared a UNESCO World Heritage Site in 2009. It is an affiliate of the Ikon Pass.

== Ski areas ==
The area consists of 16 ski areas spread over 12 resorts:

1. Cortina d'Ampezzo
2. Plan de Corones/Kronplatz
3. Alta Badia
4. Val Gardena/Gröden
5. Alpe di Siusi/Seiser Alm
6. Val di Fassa
7. Carezza
8. Arabba
9. Marmolada
10. Tre Cime (since 1975)
11. Val di Fiemme (since 1976)
12. Obereggen (since 1976)
13. San Martino di Castrozza – Rolle Pass (since 1976)
14. Rio Pusteria – Bressanone/Brixen (since 1979)
15. Alpe Lusia – San Pellegrino (since 1984)
16. Civetta (since 1993)

== Ski slopes and circuits ==
The Sella Ronda and Gardena Ronda and other major ski circuits are located within the resort. Several ski courses, such as the Saslong and Gran Risa, regularly host World Cup events.

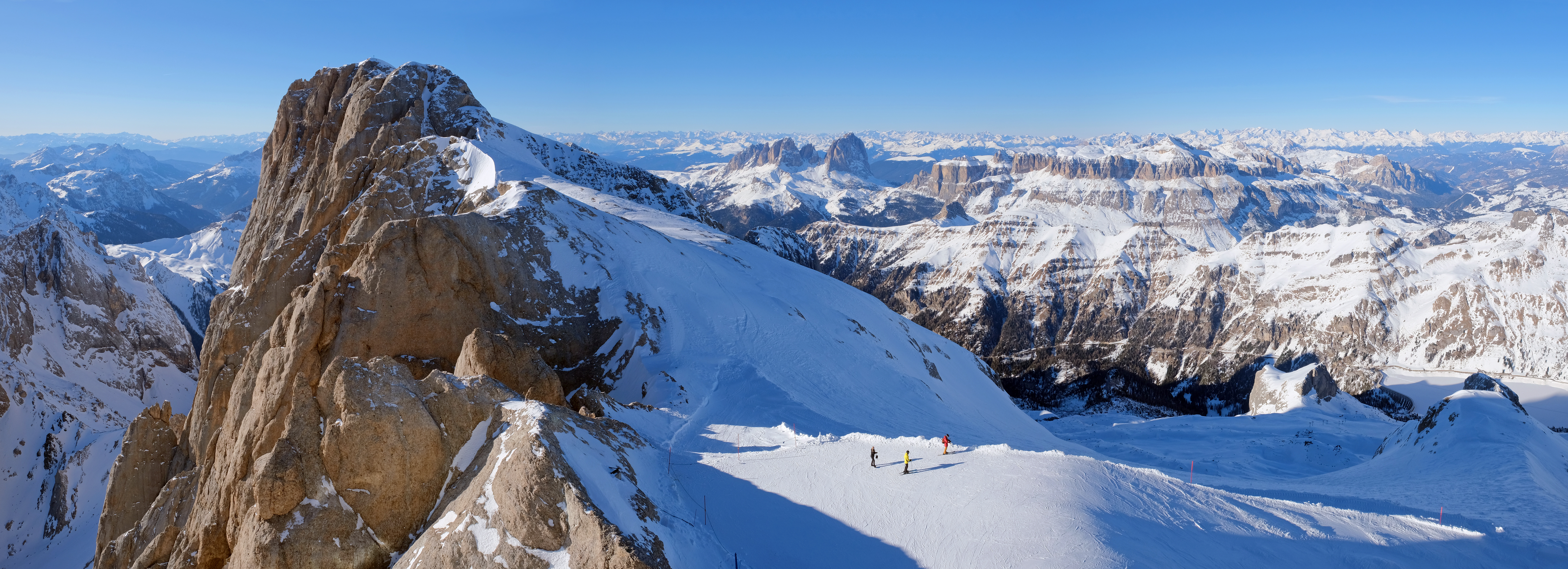
The highest point of Dolomiti Superski reachable with ski lifts: Punta Rocca, Marmolada.

=== Notable Ski Slopes in the Dolomites ===
The Dolomites offer a wide variety of ski slopes, many of which are well-known for hosting international competitions or for their technical and scenic features.

- Saslong (Val Gardena – Santa Cristina): Hosts the men's Downhill and Super-G World Cup races.
- Cir (Val Gardena – Selva): Used for the women's downhill race during the 1970 FIS Alpine World Ski Championships.
- Gran Risa (Alta Badia – La Villa): Hosts the men's Giant Slalom World Cup events.
- La Bellunese (Marmolada): A long run descending from 3,300 m at Punta Rocca to 1,400 m in Malga Ciapela.
- Porta Vescovo Slopes (Arabba): Includes well-known runs such as Fodoma, Sourasass, Ornella, and Salere.
- Vallon + Boè (Alta Badia – Corvara): Over 5 km long, this slope features a vertical drop of nearly 1,000 m. It starts as a black run, turns red after the Boè gondola midstation, and continues down to Corvara.
- Sylvester & Hernegg (Plan de Corones – Brunico): Two long runs (nearly 5 km) descending from the summit of Plan de Corones to the town of Brunico, with a vertical drop of about 1,300 m.
- Erta & Piculin (Plan de Corones – San Vigilio di Marebbe): The Erta hosts the annual Women's Giant Slalom World Cup. Piculin, located on the opposite slope, is also a black run. Both are suitable only for expert skiers.
- Olimpia (Val di Fiemme/Obereggen – Alpe Cermis): Divided into three sections; the first and second are challenging, while the third is classified as red. The entire slope is 7 km long with a vertical drop of nearly 1,400 m.
- Trametsch (Rio Pusteria/Bressanone – Plose): A long descent known for its length and vertical drop.
- Aloch (Val di Fassa – Pozza di Fassa): Hosts European Cup slalom events.
- Tognola Uno (San Martino di Castrozza): A well-known slope in the Tognola ski area.
- La Volata (Passo San Pellegrino): A black run used in various competitions.
- Piavac (Alpe Lusia): A challenging black run in the Alpe Lusia ski area.
- Lagazuoi and Armentarola (Passo Falzarego – Alta Badia): Scenic intermediate runs offering unique views of the Dolomites.
- Salere (Ski Civetta – Selva di Cadore): A panoramic red run approximately 4 km long, with a varied track and about 700 m of vertical drop.
