= Fiescheralp =

Locality in Valais, Switzerland

Coordinates: 46.412°N 8.102°E

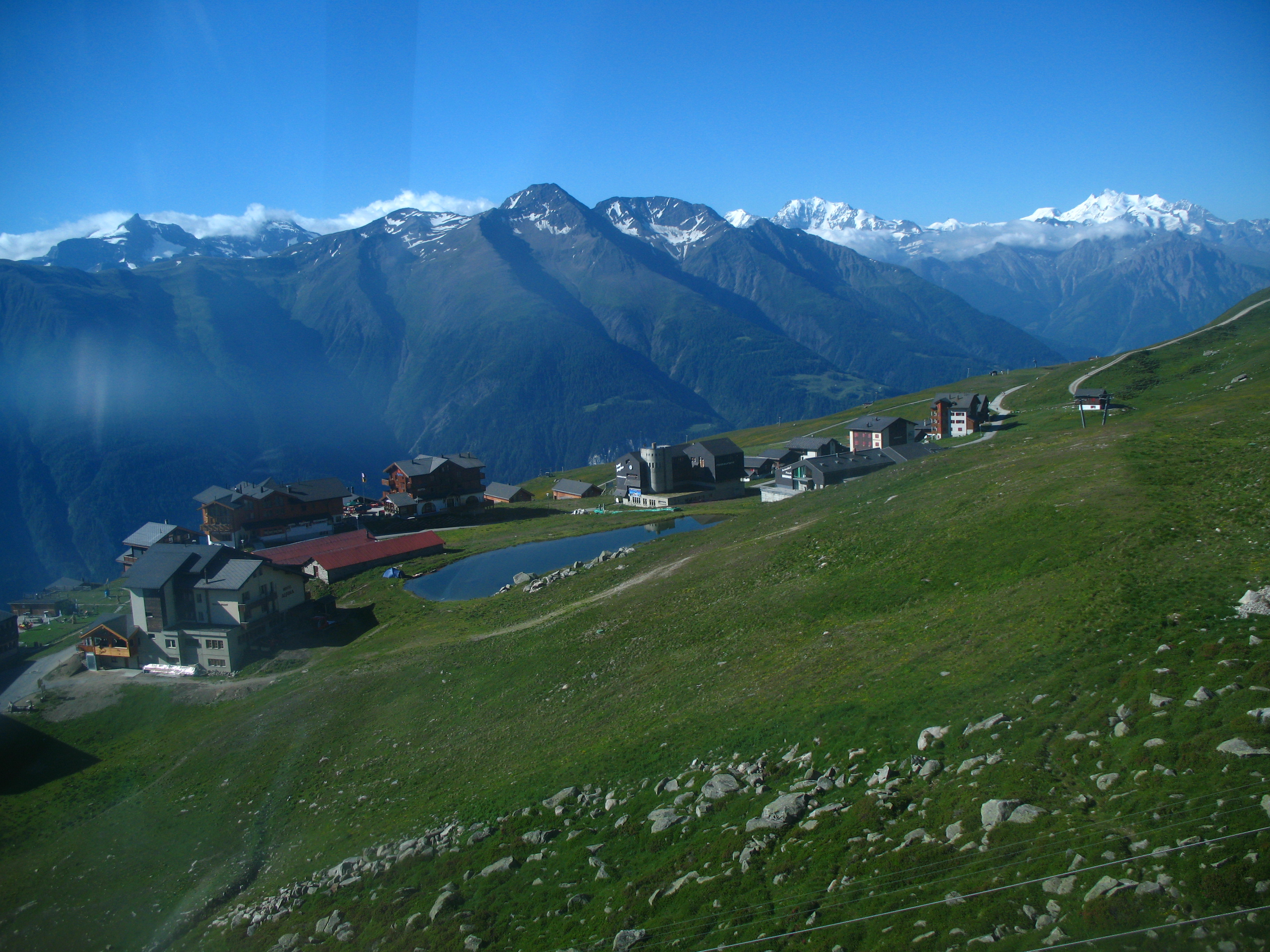
Fiescheralp

Fiescheralp (also known as Kühboden, literally "cows' floor") is a locality in the canton of Valais, Switzerland, situated above Fiesch at an elevation of 2,212 metres (7,257 ft) above sea level. It is the highest of the three car-free resorts lying on the southern slopes of the Eggishorn range, the two other being Riederalp and Bettmeralp to the west. Fiescheralp itself lies on a small plateau, approximately 200 metres above the tree line. Administratively, it belongs to the municipality of Fiesch, the border with the municipality of Lax running just west of the resort.

Like the two other car-free resorts, Fiescheralp can be reached by an aerial tramway. The valley station is located in Fiesch at 1,061 metres (3,481 ft). From Fiescheralp another aerial tramway leads to the Eggishorn station at 2,869 metres (9,413 ft), which lies on the Fiescherhorli summit, near the Eggishorn.

In winter Fiescheralp is part of the ski area named Aletsch Arena.
