= Prutz =

Municipality in Tyrol, Austria

- Municipality
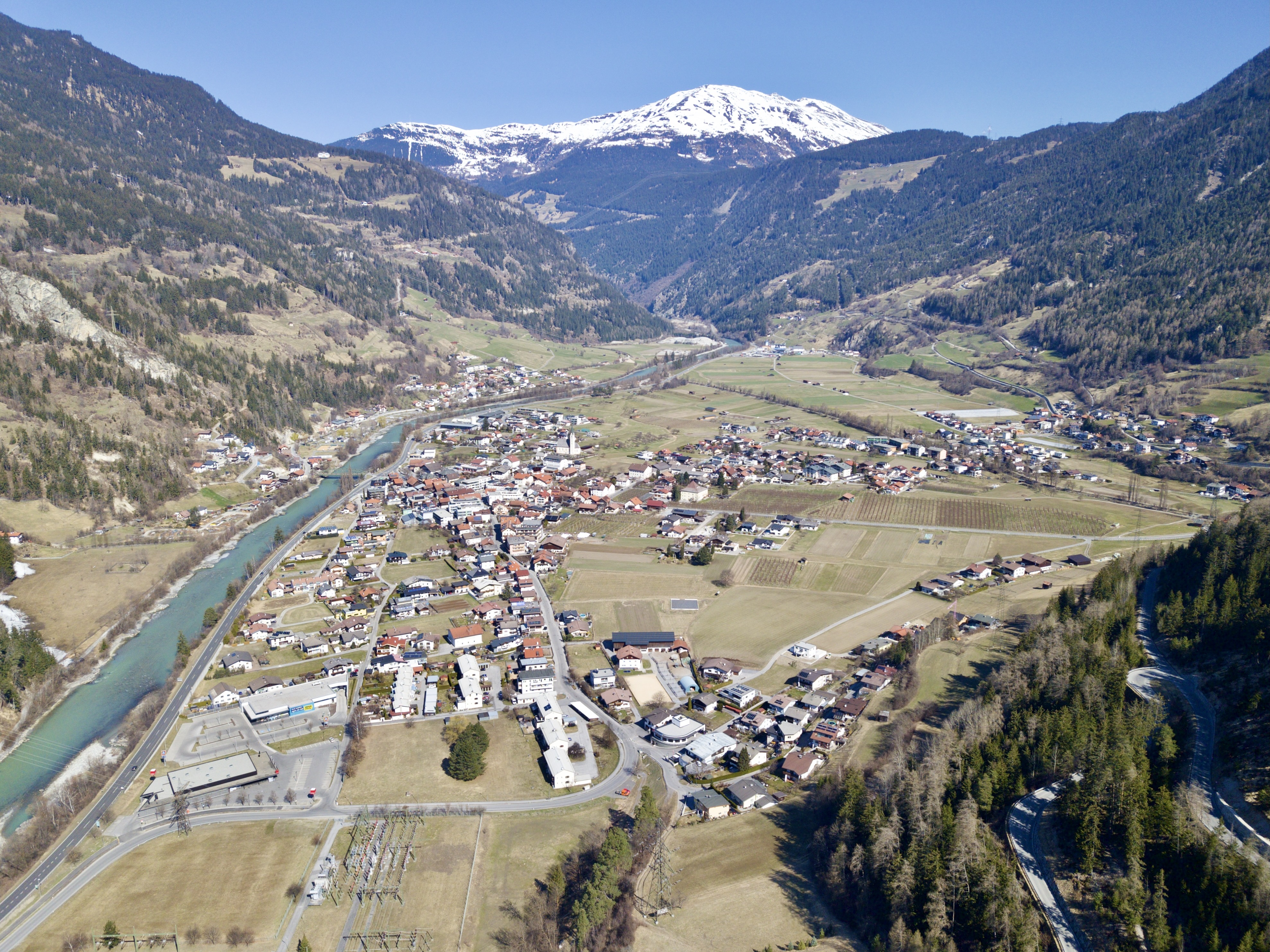
- View of Prutz towards north

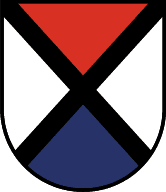
- Coat of arms

- Location within Austria
- Coordinates: 47°04′35″N 10°39′49″E
- Country: Austria
- State: Tyrol
- District: Landeck

Government
  - Mayor: Heinz Kofler

Area
  - Total: 9.74 km^{2} (3.76 sq mi)
- Elevation: 864 m (2,835 ft)

Population (2021)
  - Total: 1,884
  - Density: 193/km^{2} (501/sq mi)
- Time zone: UTC+1 (CET)
  - Summer (DST): UTC+2 (CEST)
- Postal code: 6522
- Area code: 05472
- Vehicle registration: LA
- Website: www.prutz.tirol.gv.at

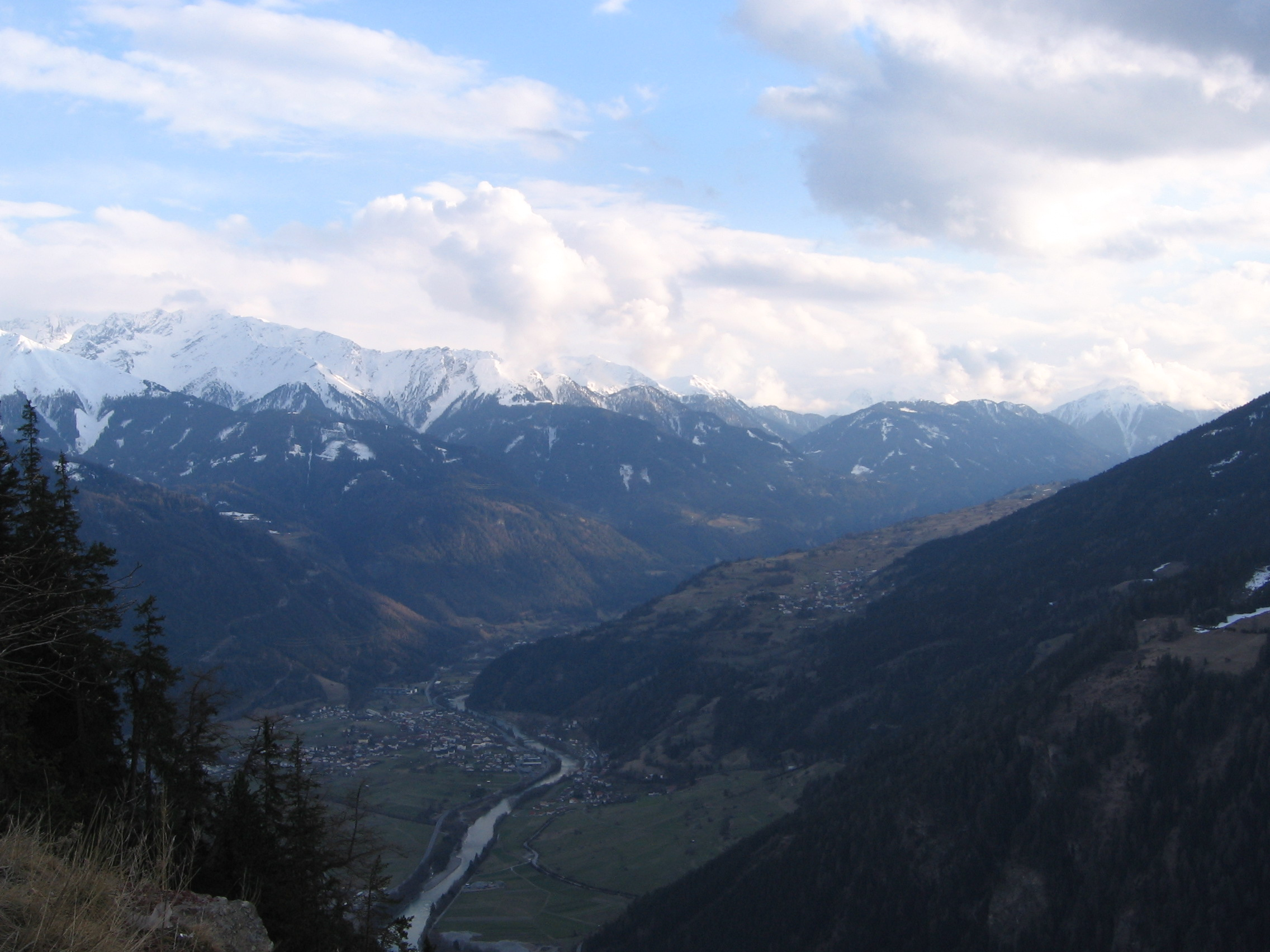
View towards south

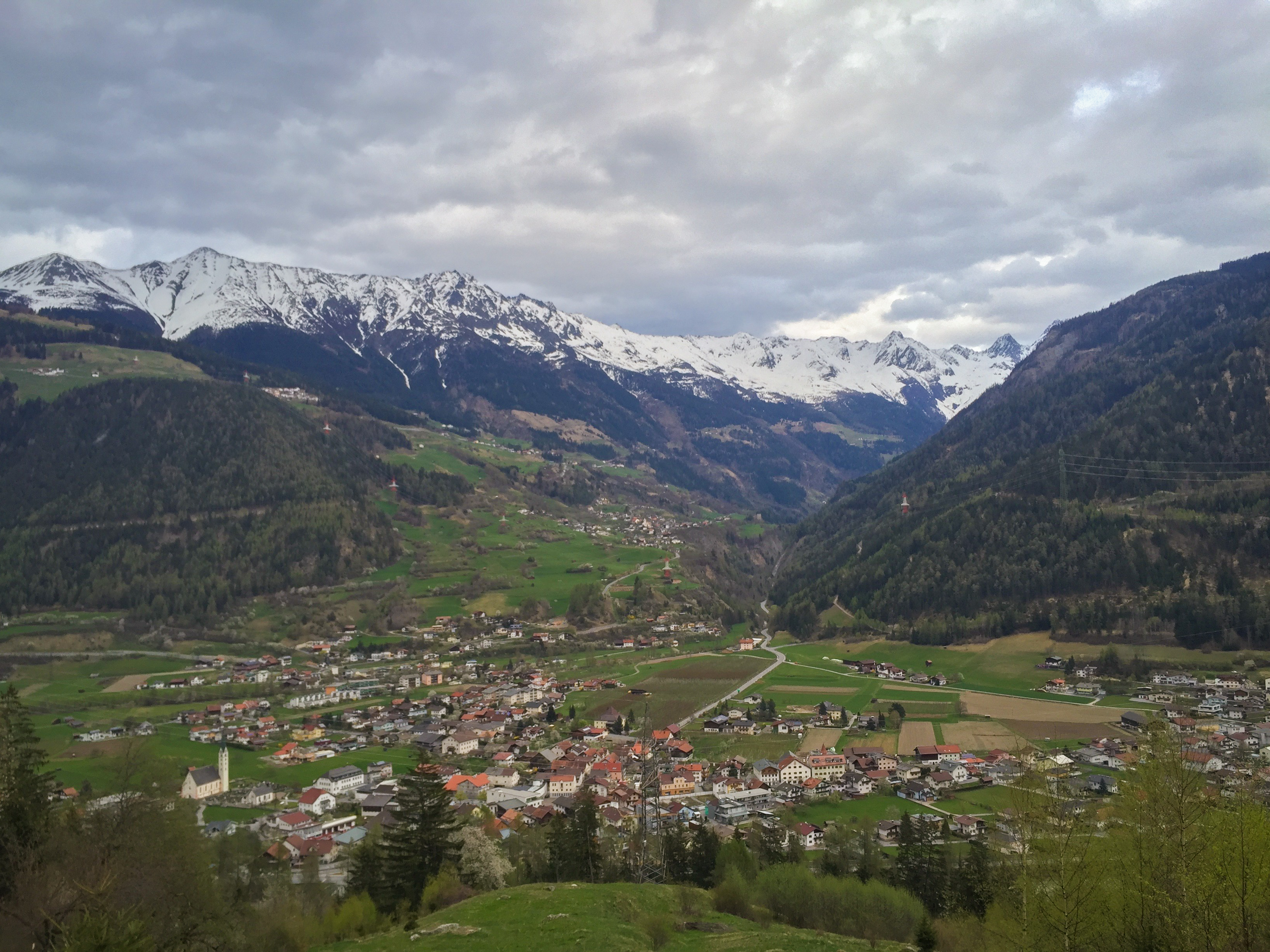
View towards east

Prutz is a municipality in the Landeck district in the Austrian state of Tyrol. Located at the mouth of the Kauner valley on the upper Inn, it is 10 km south of the city of Landeck and 36 km north of Reschen Pass, that forms the border to Italy. The border to Switzerland is located 23 km away towards the south-west.

== History ==
Prutz, situated on the former Via Claudia Augusta, was a resting place and later post station from Carolingian times, with favourable opportunities for the development of a settlement. The place is first recorded in 1027–1034 as locus qui dicitur Bruttes ("the place called Bruttes") in relation to a dispute over tithes between the bishops' churches of Brixen and Regensburg. The Late Gothic parish church was refurbished in the Baroque style in the 17th century.

In 1903 a disastrous fire destroyed the greater part of the village, although the typical West Tyrolean layout of close housing still remains in the centre.

Prutz was originally administratively part of Ried im Oberinntal, which was dissolved as an administrative unit in 1978, when Prutz became part of Landeck.

== Geography ==
Prutz is situated at the intersection of the rivers Inn and Faggenbach. The recreation area and nature park Kaunergrat is located at the east of the village. The skiing resort Serfaus-Fiss-Ladis is located to the west of the village.

Prutz is located on the cycling route Via Claudia Augusta.

== Climate ==
Climate data for Prutz (1971–2000)
Month	Jan	Feb	Mar	Apr	May	Jun	Jul	Aug	Sep	Oct	Nov	Dec	Year
Record high °C (°F)	13.5 (56.3)	18.0 (64.4)	22.4 (72.3)	25.0 (77.0)	30.5 (86.9)	33.4 (92.1)	35.5 (95.9)	33.6 (92.5)	29.3 (84.7)	25.3 (77.5)	20.0 (68.0)	15.2 (59.4)	35.5 (95.9)
Mean daily maximum °C (°F)	2.2 (36.0)	4.9 (40.8)	9.9 (49.8)	13.4 (56.1)	18.6 (65.5)	21.5 (70.7)	23.8 (74.8)	23.4 (74.1)	20.0 (68.0)	14.7 (58.5)	7.0 (44.6)	2.8 (37.0)	13.5 (56.3)
Daily mean °C (°F)	−2.9 (26.8)	−1.2 (29.8)	3.0 (37.4)	6.6 (43.9)	11.4 (52.5)	14.3 (57.7)	16.2 (61.2)	15.7 (60.3)	12.2 (54.0)	7.3 (45.1)	1.5 (34.7)	−2.0 (28.4)	6.8 (44.2)
Mean daily minimum °C (°F)	−6.3 (20.7)	−5.1 (22.8)	−1.4 (29.5)	1.8 (35.2)	5.9 (42.6)	8.8 (47.8)	10.7 (51.3)	10.5 (50.9)	7.3 (45.1)	3.0 (37.4)	−1.8 (28.8)	−5.1 (22.8)	2.4 (36.3)
Record low °C (°F)	−22.0 (−7.6)	−18.8 (−1.8)	−17.6 (0.3)	−8.0 (17.6)	−5.9 (21.4)	0.6 (33.1)	3.2 (37.8)	1.0 (33.8)	−4.4 (24.1)	−7.8 (18.0)	−17.5 (0.5)	−19.2 (−2.6)	−22.0 (−7.6)
Average precipitation mm (inches)	31.9 (1.26)	30.2 (1.19)	31.3 (1.23)	26.1 (1.03)	53.6 (2.11)	86.2 (3.39)	98.6 (3.88)	99.2 (3.91)	61.4 (2.42)	40.1 (1.58)	39.7 (1.56)	35.3 (1.39)	633.6 (24.94)
Average snowfall cm (inches)	17.8 (7.0)	19.2 (7.6)	6.4 (2.5)	1.2 (0.5)	0.2 (0.1)	0.0 (0.0)	0.0 (0.0)	0.0 (0.0)	0.0 (0.0)	0.0 (0.0)	5.0 (2.0)	15.8 (6.2)	65.6 (25.8)
Average precipitation days (≥ 1.0 mm)	5.4	4.5	5.0	5.2	9.5	11.1	12.0	11.9	8.5	6.4	6.4	6.2	92.1
Average relative humidity (%) (at 14:00)	62.9	53.4	43.5	43.1	44.2	45.9	46.7	48.7	48.0	50.7	59.5	67.3	51.2
Mean monthly sunshine hours	71.6	92.1	121.9	134.1	170.2	166.3	192.7	173.0	141.2	119.9	79.5	64.7	1,527.2
Percentage possible sunshine	47.5	55.6	55.2	51.9	52.6	50.1	57.0	60.1	61.7	60.2	51.4	46.4	54.1
Source: Central Institute for Meteorology and Geodynamics

== Demographics ==
The population of Prutz was declining in the second half of the 19th century inter alia because of the emigration to the Americas at this period but started to grow steadily from 1910 onwards. As of 2013, 12% of the total population were of foreign nationality. The foreign population was divided as such: 43% of the foreigners were EU citizens, 28% were Turkish citizens, 20% were from countries of former Yugoslavia, and some 9% were of other nationalities. Evolution of the population can be seen in the table below.

Historical population
Year	Pop.	±%
1869	589	—
1880	559	−5.1%
1900	506	−9.5%
1910	473	−6.5%
1923	553	+16.9%
1934	591	+6.9%
1961	853	+44.3%
1971	1,206	+41.4%
1981	1,320	+9.5%
1991	1,444	+9.4%
2001	1,670	+15.7%
2011	1,741	+4.3%
2016	1,777	+2.1%

== Economy and infrastructure ==
One of the biggest hydroelectric power plants of Austria is located in Prutz and operated by Tiroler Wasserkraft. The hydro-power plant is linked by a 14.8 km long pipe to the Gepatschspeicher (Gepatsch Reservoir), which was constructed in 1964. Average electricity production per year is 661 GWh. Many of the neighbouring communities are major tourist resorts, whereas Prutz is home to a number of small businesses that serve the surrounding area.

The village is home to one of Austria's biggest sledge production plants. Several agricultural fields are located in the village including an apricot plantation that serves a distillery. The village also claims the highest located winery of Austria.

== Culture and sights ==
The local football club, SV Prutz, hosts an annual musical festival on the pentecost weekend where nationally recognized artists often perform. Other clubs active in the village include an orchestra group, the voluntary fire brigade, a shooting club, the distiller association, and a carnival group.

In 1212 a special fountain was discovered that is called Saurbrunn Quelle today. The water from the fountain contains iron, calcium, magnesium, and sulfur and is of carbonic nature. It is known for its special healing character. The village has built a rest area around the fountain where the water is made available to the public free of charge.

Other main sights in the village include:

- The parish church of the Ascension of the Virgin Mary (Pfarrkirche Mariä Himmelfahrt), with Chapel of St Anthony, graveyard with two chapels and adjoining priest's house
- Kaltenbrunner Chapel at the southern end of the village
- Lourdes Chapel and Calvary in Entbruck
- Tullen Chapel to the south-west of the old Inntal road
- Wiesele, a former hermitage on a wooded mountain slope
- Late Gothic houses in the village centre, and two outlying towers
- Pontlatz bridge, an iron parallel bridge of 1899

== Transportation ==
Innsbruck Airport is the closest available airport and is located 80 km away from Prutz. The next train station is Landeck-Zams railway station that is located 20 km away and is connected with a bus. A regular bus service is further maintained to Kaunertal, Scuol and Serfaus.

== People ==
- Joseph Schwarzmann (1806–1890), a distinguished ornamental painter in Munich, honorary citizen of Speyer
- Johann Piger (1848–1932), sculptor in Salzburg
