= Würzjoch =

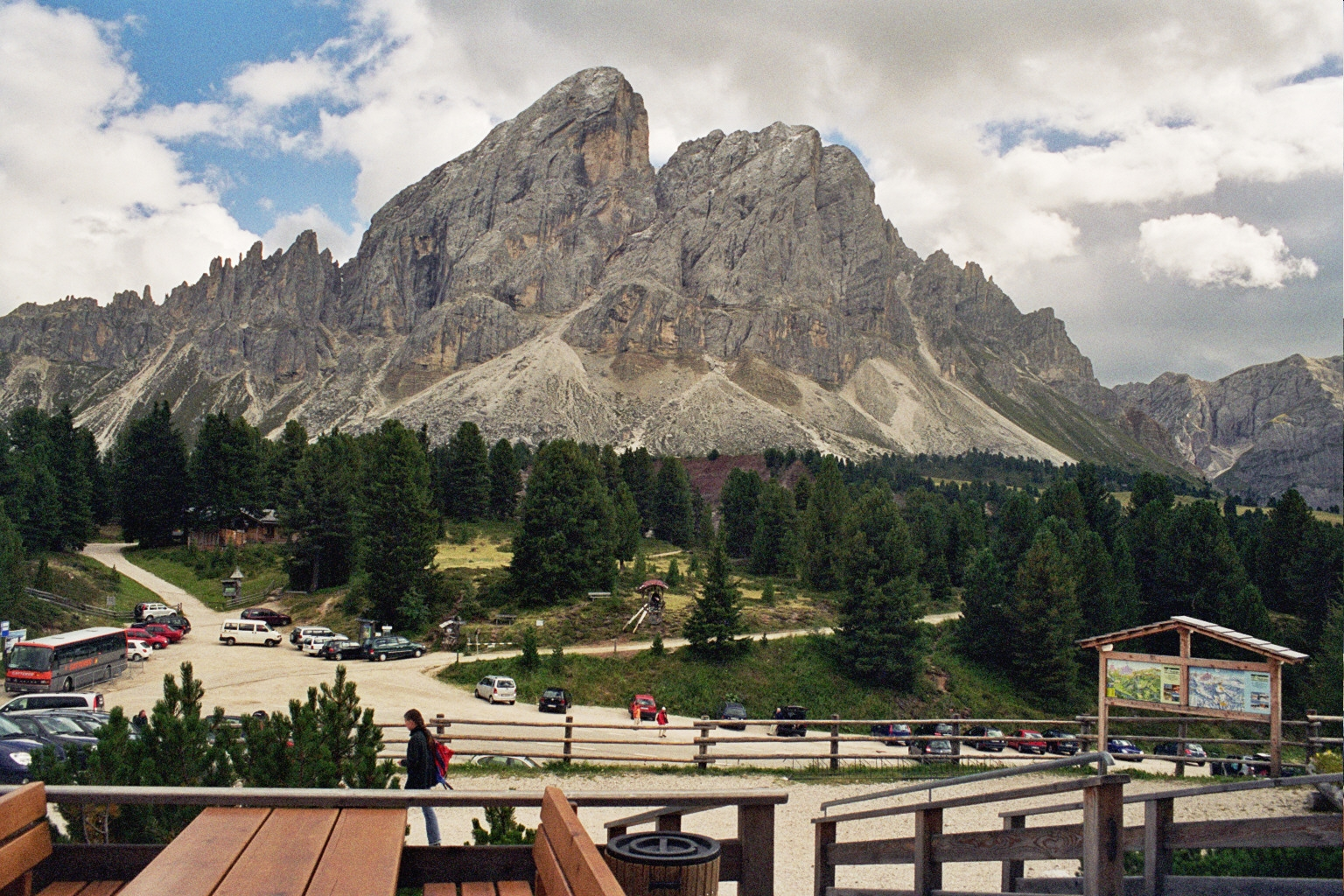
- Würzjoch
- Interactive map of Würzjoch
- Elevation: 2,006 metres (6,581 ft)t

Third Approach
- Location: South Tyrol, Italy
- Coordinates: 46°40′30″N 11°48′51″E

Würzjoch (Italian: Passo delle Erbe; Ladin: Ju de Börz; German: Würzjoch) (el. 2003 m.) is a mountain pass in the province of Bozen – Südtirol, Region Trentino-Südtirol in Italy.

It connects the city of Brixen in the Eisacktal with San Martin de Tor in the Val Badia.

The pass road is in good condition, but narrow and closed in winter. On the south side, the road is open during winter up to the Plose ski resort.
