= National Register of Historic Places listings in San Juan County, Colorado =

Location of San Juan County in Colorado

This is a list of the National Register of Historic Places listings in San Juan County, Colorado.

This is intended to be a complete list of the properties and districts on the National Register of Historic Places in San Juan County, Colorado, United States. The locations of National Register properties and districts for which the latitude and longitude coordinates are included below, may be seen in a map.

There are 12 properties and districts listed on the National Register in the county.

This National Park Service list is complete through NPS recent listings posted March 21, 2025.

== Current listings ==
	Name on the Register	Image	Date listed	Location	City or town	Description
1	Animas Forks	Animas Forks	March 21, 2011 (#11000095)	Address Restricted	Silverton	
2	Cascade Boy Scout Camp	Cascade Boy Scout Camp	September 8, 1988 (#88001529)	Adjacent to Lime Creek Rd. in the San Juan National Forest; 37°39′24″N 107°47′57″W	Durango	See Scouting in New Mexico and Scouting in Colorado
3	Durango-Silverton Narrow-Gauge Railroad	Durango-Silverton Narrow-Gauge Railroad	October 15, 1966 (#66000247)	Right-of-way between Durango and Silverton; 37°17′51″N 107°42′39″W	Silverton	
4	Frisco-Bagley Mine and Tunnel	Frisco-Bagley Mine and Tunnel	June 1, 2020 (#100005235)	820 Cty Rd. 9; 37°55′57″N 107°34′52″W	Silverton	
5	Gold Prince Mine, Mill and Aerial Tramway	Gold Prince Mine, Mill and Aerial Tramway	October 13, 2011 (#11000734)	Address Restricted	Silverton	
6	Martin Mining Complex	Martin Mining Complex	May 5, 2004 (#04000384)	6350 County Road 2; 37°53′12″N 107°33′39″W	Silverton	Now known as the Eureka Lodge.
7	Minnie Gulch Cabins	Minnie Gulch Cabins	March 21, 2011 (#11000096)	Address Restricted	Silverton	
8	Placer Gulch Boarding House	Placer Gulch Boarding House	March 21, 2011 (#11000094)	Address Restricted	Silverton	
9	Shenandoah-Dives Mill	Shenandoah-Dives Mill	February 16, 2000 (#00000262)	State Highway 110, 2 miles northeast of Silverton; 37°49′02″N 107°37′36″W	Silverton	
10	Silverton Historic District	Silverton Historic District	October 15, 1966 (#66000255)	U.S. Highway 550; also roughly along State Highway 110 and the aerial tramway from Ladore Mine to Mayflower Mine; 37°48′47″N 107°39′35″W	Silverton	Second set of addresses represents a boundary increase
11	Sound Democrat Mill and Mine and Silver Queen Mine	Sound Democrat Mill and Mine and Silver Queen Mine	April 28, 2015 (#15000171)	Address Restricted	Silverton	
12	Tobasco Mine and Mill	Tobasco Mine and Mill	October 16, 2008 (#08000983)	South of San Juan County Road 5 and Hinsdale County Road 34; 37°55′52″N 107°32′24″W	San Juan	Extends into Hinsdale County

== See also ==
- List of National Historic Landmarks in Colorado
- List of National Register of Historic Places in Colorado
- Bibliography of Colorado
- Geography of Colorado
- History of Colorado
- Index of Colorado-related articles
- List of Colorado-related lists
- Outline of Colorado
