= Howardsville, Colorado =

Unincorporated community in San Miguel County, Colorado, United States

Howardsville
- Unincorporated community
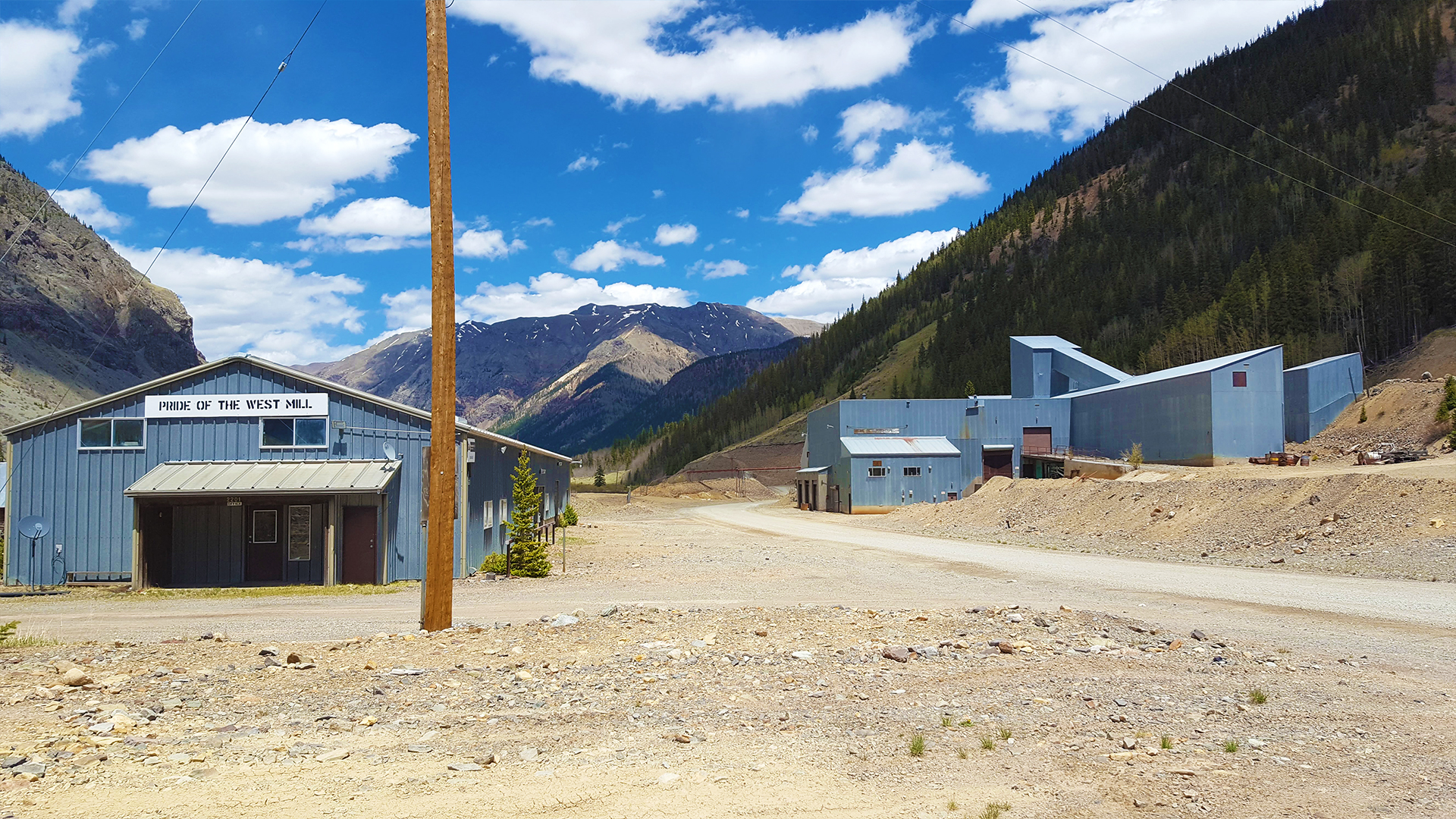
- The Pride of the West Mill in Howardsville in 2018

- Location within the state of Colorado Location within the United States
- Coordinates: 37°50′08″N 107°35′39″W
- Country: United States
- State: Colorado
- County: San Juan
- Elevation: 9,748 ft (2,971 m)
- Time zone: UTC-7 (Mountain (MST))
  - Summer (DST): UTC-6 (MDT)
- GNIS feature ID: 187646

Howardsville is an unincorporated community in San Juan County, Colorado, United States, along the Animas River at the mouth of Cunningham Creek. It is located about two miles from the town of Silverton and 8 miles from the famous ghost town of Animas Forks, and is on the same road as the ghost towns of Middleton and Eureka.

== History ==
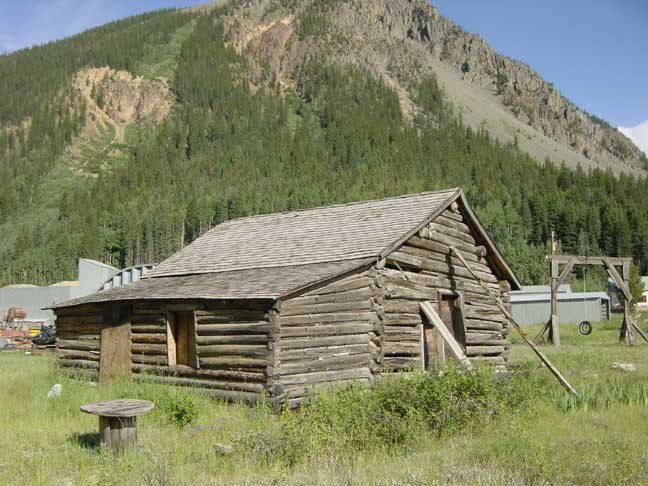
An abandoned cabin in Howardsville in September 2008

Established and laid out by the Bullion City Company as Bullion City in 1874, it was renamed either for Lieutenant Howard, a once-prominent local figure, or for George Howard, who once had a cabin in the area. Howardsville was the original La Plata County seat from its creation on February 10, 1874, until the creation of San Juan County on January 31, 1876. The Howardsville post office operated from June 24, 1874, until October 31, 1939. The Silverton Northern Railroad laid tracks to reach Howardsville in 1896, with an extension getting built from Howardsville into Cunningham Gulch to reach the Old Hundred Mine, along with the Green Mountain Mine, in 1905. The town would be sustained for the remainder of its life by the Pride Of The West Mill and the Little Nation Tram House & Mill, among other mines & mills. The town effectively died in 1939 when its post office shut down, and the Silverton Northern Railroad tracks would get torn up in 1942.

== See also ==
- List of county seats in Colorado
