= Old Hundred Gold Mine =

Gold mine in Colorado, United States

Coordinates: 37°49′25.51″N 107°35′6.16″W

The Old Hundred Gold Mine is a gold mine in San Juan County, Colorado, United States. The mine is about five miles east of Silverton, Colorado, near the ghost town of Howardsville. The property is no longer mined, but is open for tours in the summer.

High on the mountain above the main entrance is the former boarding house for the miners. The boardinghouse structure was stabilized against collapse by preservation efforts funded by the Colorado State Historical Fund.

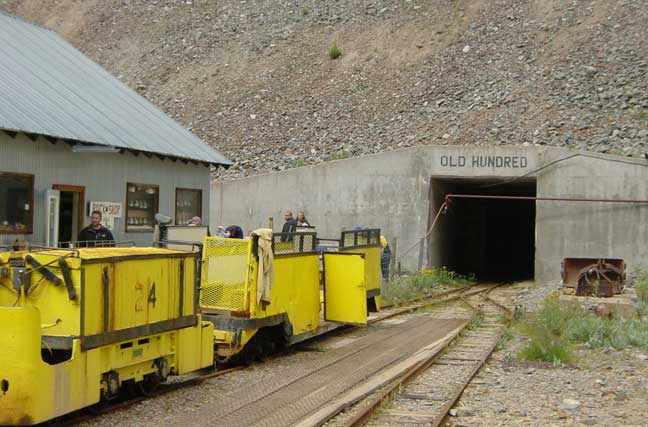
Old Hundred mine

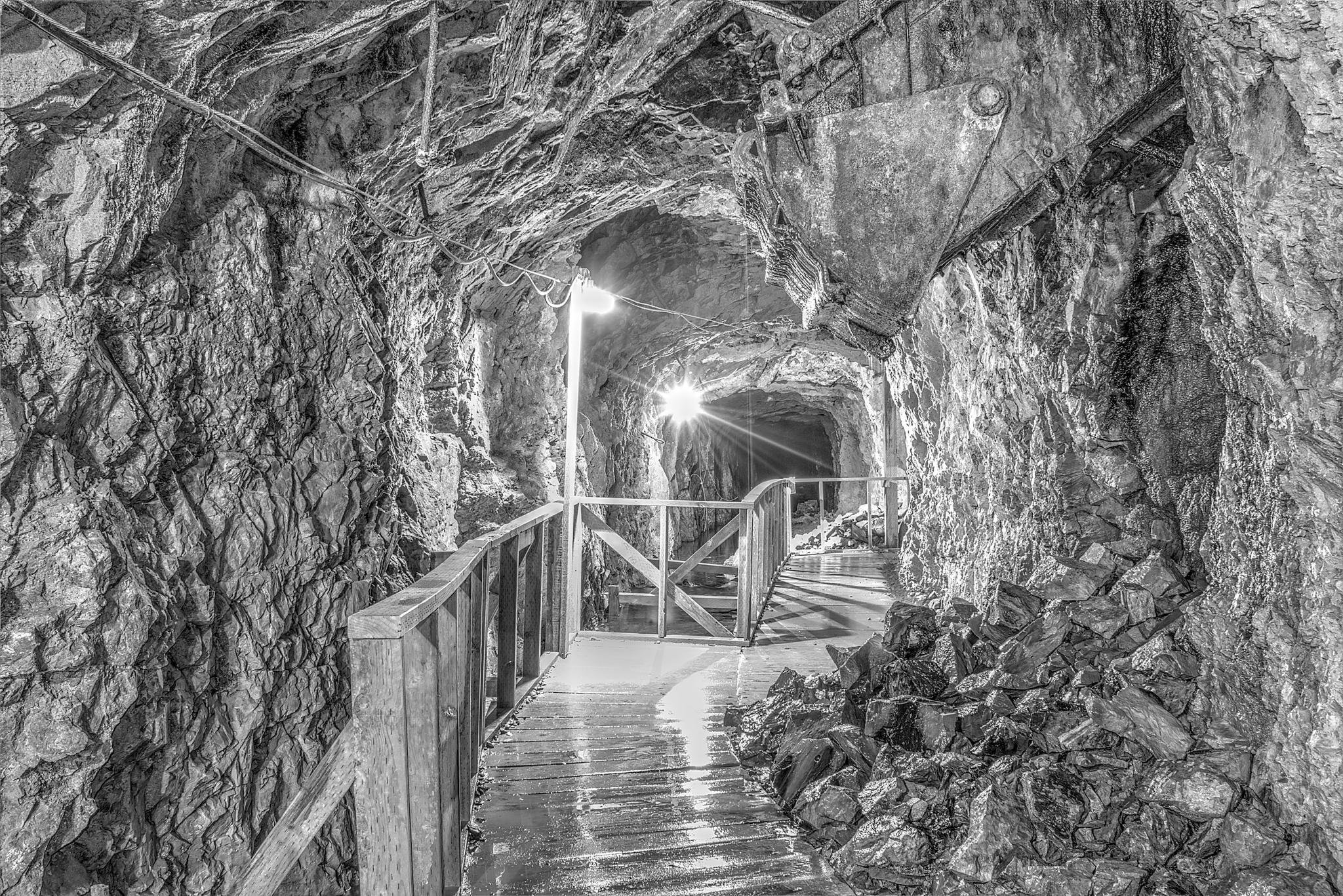

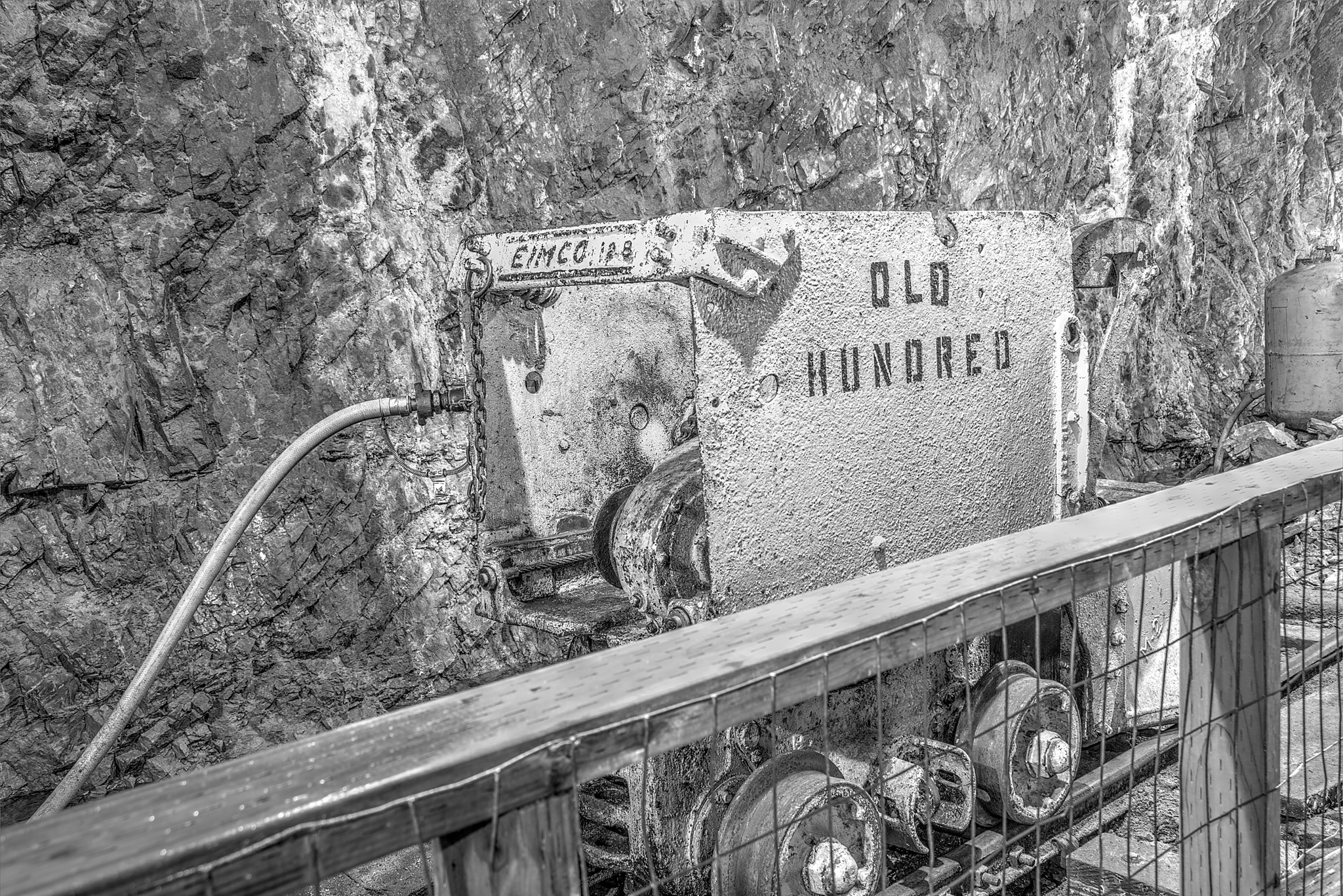

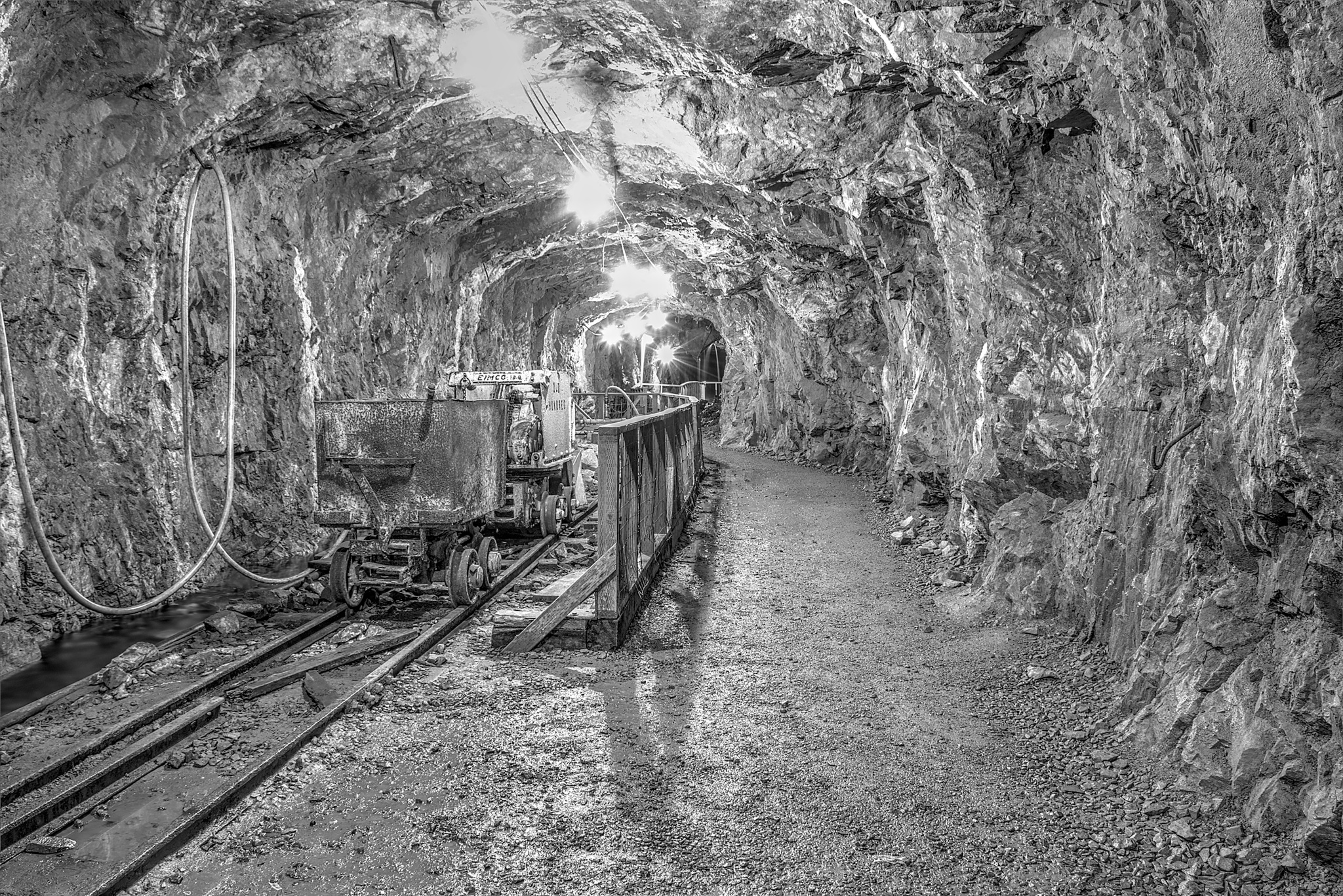
