= National Register of Historic Places listings in Hinsdale County, Colorado =

Location of Hinsdale County in Colorado

This is a list of the National Register of Historic Places listings in Hinsdale County, Colorado.

This is intended to be a complete list of the properties and districts on the National Register of Historic Places in Hinsdale County, Colorado, United States. The locations of National Register properties and districts for which the latitude and longitude coordinates are included below, may be seen in a map.

There are 12 properties and districts listed on the National Register in the county.

This National Park Service list is complete through NPS recent listings posted March 21, 2025.

== Current listings ==
	Name on the Register	Image	Date listed	Location	City or town	Description
1	Argentum Mining Camp	Argentum Mining Camp	September 28, 1999 (#99001235)	Address Restricted	Lake City	Burrows Park, Alpine Loop National Back Country Byway
2	Capitol City Charcoal Kilns	Capitol City Charcoal Kilns	September 28, 1999 (#99001236)	Address Restricted	Lake City	
3	Debs School	Debs School	April 28, 2005 (#05000338)	2783 McManus Rd. 37°26′16″N 107°09′42″W	Pagosa Springs	
4	Empire Chief Mine and Mill	Empire Chief Mine and Mill	September 28, 1999 (#99001237)	Address Restricted	Lake City	Last standing building collapsed, winter 2007/2008
5	Golconda Mine	Golconda Mine	September 28, 1999 (#99001234)	Address Restricted	Lake City	
6	Lake City Historic District	Lake City Historic District	December 1, 1978 (#78000859)	Roughly bounded by Bluff, 8th, Lake, and 1st Streets; 38°01′46″N 107°18′58″W	Lake City	May-Bardwell-Heath house, 1891, in historic district
7	Little Rome		September 28, 1999 (#99001233)	Address Restricted	Lake City	
8	Lost Trail Station	Lost Trail Station	April 27, 2011 (#11000219)	81125 Forest Service Road 520; 37°46′08″N 107°21′45″W	Creede	
9	Rose Lime Kiln	Rose Lime Kiln	April 8, 1993 (#93000293)	County Road 20 southwest of Lake City; 37°58′23″N 107°31′24″W	Lake City	
10	Tellurium-White Cross Mining Camp		September 28, 1999 (#99001232)	Address Restricted	Lake City	
11	Tobasco Mine and Mill	Tobasco Mine and Mill	October 16, 2008 (#08000983)	South of San Juan County Road 5 and Hinsdale County Road 34; 37°55′50″N 107°32′08″W	Lake City	Listed as part of Hinsdale Metal Mining MPS; extends into San Juan County
12	Ute-Ulay Mine and Mill	Ute-Ulay Mine and Mill	October 26, 2017 (#100001755)	County Road 20; 38°01′11″N 107°22′35″W	Lake City	

== See also ==
- List of National Historic Landmarks in Colorado
- List of National Register of Historic Places in Colorado
- Bibliography of Colorado
- Geography of Colorado
- History of Colorado
- Index of Colorado-related articles
- List of Colorado-related lists
- Outline of Colorado
