= St. Patrick Catholic Church (Silverton, Colorado) =

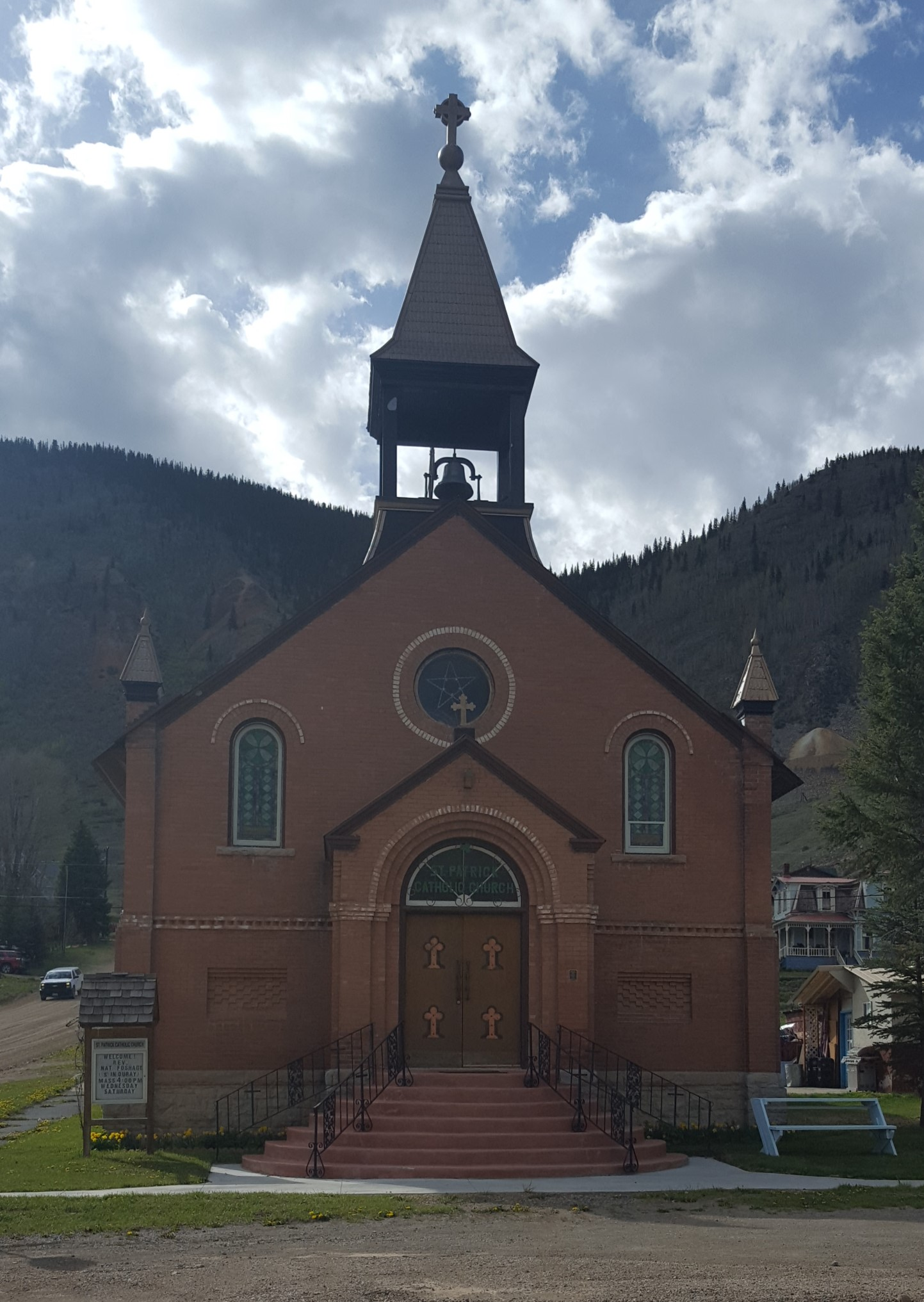
- Saint Patrick Catholic Church in Silverton Colorado

- Location within Colorado
- 37°48′38.7″N 107°40′01.2″W
- Location: 1005 Reese Street; Silverton, Colorado
- Country: United States
- Denomination: Catholic

History
- Founded: 1882

Architecture
- Architect: William Cole
- Groundbreaking: 1905

St. Patrick Catholic Church is a Catholic church in Silverton, Colorado. Located at 1005 Reese street, the church was built in 1905.
