= Animas Forks Pioneer =

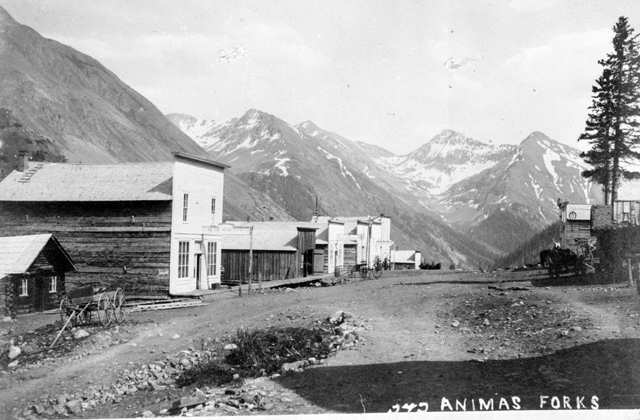
- Animas Forks in 1885
- Type: Weekly newspaper
- Publisher: George N. Raymond
- Founded: June 17, 1882
- Ceased publication: October 1886
- Language: English
- City: Animas Forks, Colorado
- Country: United States
- Circulation: less than 450, probably 120 (as of 1883)
- OCLC number: 13109907

The Animas Forks Pioneer was the only newspaper ever published in the mining town of Animas Forks, San Juan County, Colorado. This American English newspaper began publication in 1882 and lasted only four years, ceasing publication in October 1886 when the period of speculative mining ceased. The publisher was George N. Raymond. Animas Forks became a ghost town by the 1920s. The Pioneer printing plant was the highest altitude printing plant in U.S. history.
