= Needleton, Colorado =

Ghost town in Colorado, United States

Needleton
- Ghost town
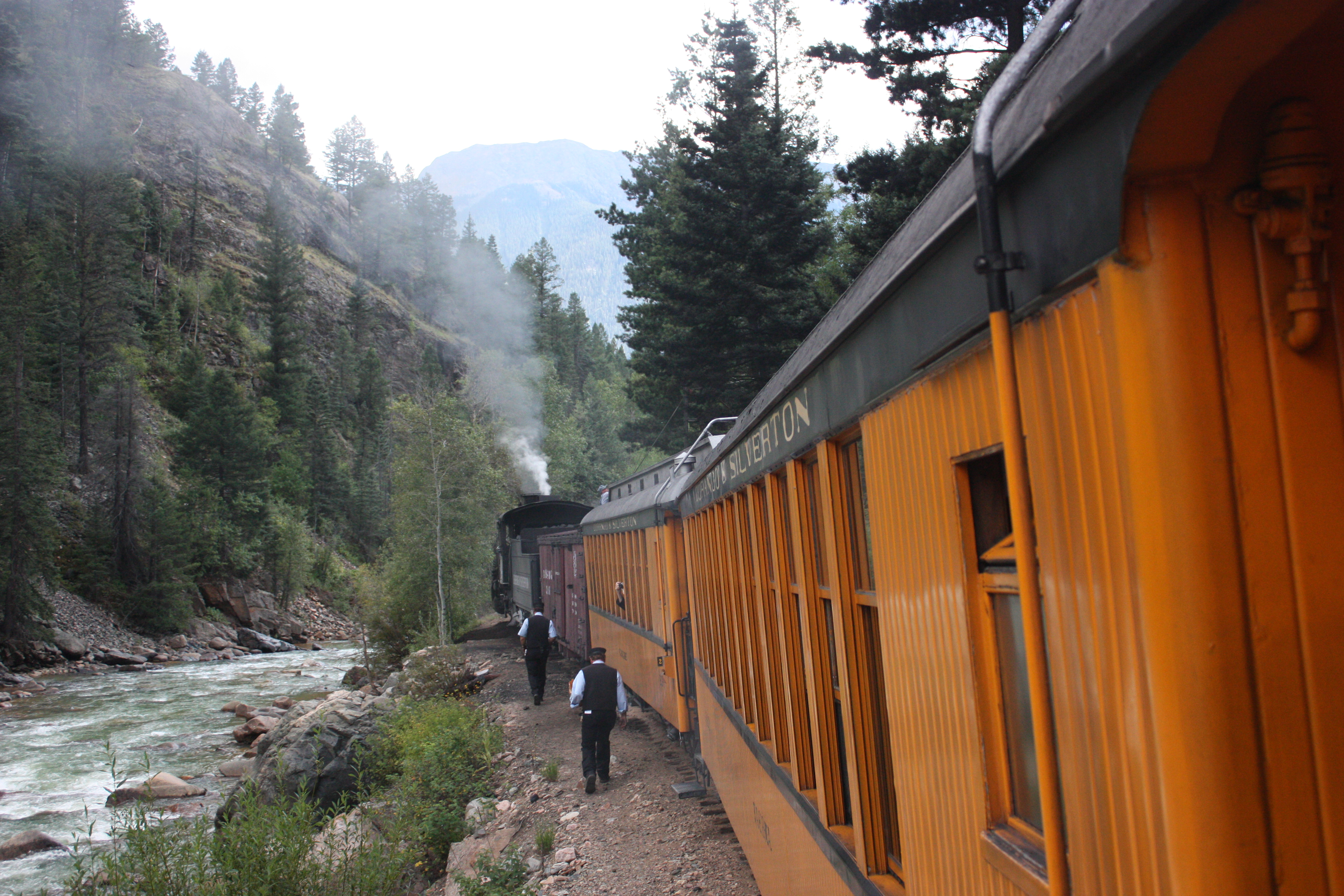
- The flag stop at Needleton, August 2009

- Location of Needleton in Colorado Location of Needleton in the United States
- Coordinates: 37°38′26″N 107°41′29″W
- Country: United States
- State: Colorado
- County: San Juan
- Elevation: 8,277 ft (2,523 m)
- Time zone: UTC-7 (Mountain (MST))
  - Summer (DST): UTC-6 (MDT)
- GNIS feature ID: 187781

Needleton is a ghost town in San Juan County, Colorado, United States. Its elevation is 8,277 feet (2,523 m).

== Description ==
Needleton was a station on the old Denver and Rio Grande Western railroad. The Needleton post office opened in May 1882, and closed in January 1919. The Needleton station was washed away in the flood of 1927.

Needleton is now a flag stop on the Durango & Silverton Narrow Gauge Railroad. Just north of the flag stop is one of the last of two remaining wooden water tanks on the Durango and Silverton.

Needleton is a popular trailhead for hiking into the Needle Mountains. The most popular hike is to the Chicago Basin.

== See also ==
- List of ghost towns in Colorado
