= List of National Historic Landmarks in Colorado =

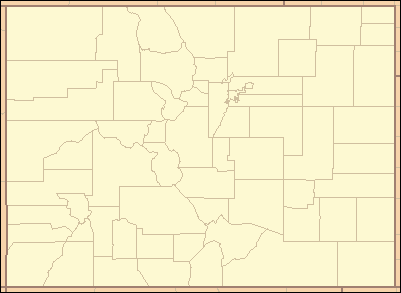

This is a list of National Historic Landmarks in Colorado. There are 29 National Historic Landmarks in Colorado, two of which extend into New Mexico.

== Key ==
	National Historic Landmark
^{†}	National Historic Landmark District
^{#}	National Historic Site, National Historical Park, National Memorial, or National Monument
^{*}	Delisted Landmark

== National Historic Landmarks in Colorado ==
	Landmark name	Image	Date designated	Location	County	Description
1^{#}	Bent's Old Fort	Bent's Old Fort	December 19, 1960 (#66000254)	La Junta; 38°02′23″N 103°25′36″W	Otero	Adobe fort built in 1833 to trade with Plains Indians and trappers, on Santa Fe Trail
2	Boulder County Courthouse	Boulder County Courthouse	December 13, 2024 (#100011355)	1300/1325 Pearl Street; 40°01′06″N 105°16′41″W	Boulder	First place in the nation where same-sex marriage certificates were issued.
3^{†}	Central City/Black Hawk Historic District	Central City/Black Hawk Historic District	July 4, 1961 (#66000246)	Central City and Black Hawk; 39°48′04″N 105°30′47″W	Gilpin	Former gold mining camps in the Front Range of the Rocky Mountains, once known as the 'Richest Square Mile on Earth
4^{†}	Colorado Chautauqua	Colorado Chautauqua	February 10, 2006 (#78000830)	Boulder; 39°59′54″N 105°16′49″W	Boulder	This 1898 Chautauqua is the only one West of the Mississippi, one of only four continuously operating since its inception, and the only one open year round.
5	Colorado Fuel and Iron Company Administration Complex (Minnequa Steel Works)	Colorado Fuel and Iron Company Administration Complex	January 13, 2021 (#100006242)	215 and 225 Canal St. 38°14′17″N 104°36′46″W	Pueblo	First major steel works west of the Mississippi.
6^{†}	Cripple Creek Historic District	Cripple Creek Historic District	July 4, 1961 (#66000939)	Cripple Creek; 38°44′48″N 105°10′31″W	Teller	The gold mining town of Cripple Creek and the surrounding hills
7^{†}	Cumbres & Toltec Scenic Railroad	Cumbres & Toltec Scenic Railroad	October 16, 2012 (#73000462)	Antonito, CO and Chama, NM; 37°04′11″N 106°00′43″W	Conejos, CO, Archuleta, CO, and Rio Arriba, NM	Longest & most complete representation of late nineteenth- and early twentieth-century railroading.
8^{†}	Denver Civic Center	Denver Civic Center	October 16, 2012 (#12001017)	Denver; 39°44′21″N 104°59′20″W	Denver	City Beautiful-era civic center.
9	Durango & Silverton Narrow Gauge Railroad	Durango & Silverton Narrow Gauge Railroad	July 4, 1961 (#66000247)	Durango to Silverton; 37°16′09″N 107°52′57″W	La Plata and San Juan	Narrow gauge mining railroad which has continued to serve as a tourist line between Durango and Silverton
10^{†}	Georgetown-Silver Plume Historic District	Georgetown-Silver Plume Historic District	November 13, 1966 (#66000243)	Georgetown and Silver Plume; 39°42′22″N 105°41′51″W	Clear Creek	Historic district which includes the silver mining towns of Georgetown and Silver Plume as well as the 1884 railway engineering marvel which connects them, the Georgetown Loop Railroad.
11	Granada Relocation Center (Amache National Historic Site)	Granada Relocation Center	February 10, 2006 (#94000425)	Granada; 38°02′55″N 102°19′42″W	Prowers	World War II Japanese American internment center
12^{†}	Leadville Historic District	Leadville Historic District	July 4, 1961 (#66000248)	Leadville; 39°14′50″N 106°17′29″W	Lake	Historic Leadville, Colorado mining district and village area
13	Lindenmeier Site	Lindenmeier Site	January 20, 1961 (#66000249)	Norfolk; 40°58′48″N 105°03′44″W	Larimer	The only extensive Folsom culture campsite yet found with artifacts dating from approximately 11200 BCE to 3000 BCE.
14	Lowry Ruin	Lowry Ruin	July 19, 1964 (#66000253)	Pleasant View; 37°35′05″N 108°55′13″W	Montezuma	Ancestral Puebloan archaeological site from 1060 with a very large kiva
15	Ludlow Tent Colony Site	Ludlow Tent Colony Site	January 16, 2009 (#85001328)	Ludlow; 37°20′21″N 104°35′02″W	Las Animas	Site of 1914 miners' strike that culminated in Ludlow Massacre
16^{†}	Mesa Verde Administrative District	Mesa Verde Administrative District	May 29, 1987 (#87001410)	Mesa Verde National Park; 37°11′03″N 108°29′17″W	Montezuma	First buildings built by the National Park Service with intent to reflect cultural traditions in the park area, built in 1921
17	Philadelphia Toboggan Company Carousel #6 (Burlington Carousel)	Philadelphia Toboggan Company Carousel #6	February 27, 1987 (#78000861)	Burlington; 39°18′33″N 102°16′14″W	Kit Carson	Carousel built for Elitch Gardens in 1905. In 1928 it moved to Kit Carson County fairgrounds where it remains open today. It is the only antique carousel in America retaining its original paint on both the scenery panels and the animals, and it is the only surviving Philadelphia Toboggan Company menagerie carousel.
18	Pikes Peak	Pikes Peak	July 4, 1961 (#66000245)	Colorado Springs; 38°50′26″N 105°02′42″W	El Paso	Pike's Peak (everything above 14,000 feet (4,300 m) elevation). This mountain was inspiration for "America the Beautiful" as well as the motto "Pike's Peak or Bust"
19	Pike's Stockade	Pike's Stockade	July 4, 1961 (#66000244)	Sanford; 37°17′37″N 105°48′37″W	Conejos	Explorer Zebulon Pike set up a fort here.
20	Raton Pass	Raton Pass	December 19, 1960 (#66000474)	Trinidad, CO and Raton, NM; 36°59′28″N 104°29′12″W	Las Animas, CO and Colfax, NM	Mountain pass between New Mexico and Colorado
21	Red Rocks Park and Mount Morrison Civilian Conservation Corps Camp	Red Rocks Park and Mount Morrison Civilian Conservation Corps Camp	August 4, 2015 (#90000725)	Morrison, CO; 39°39′56″N 105°12′21″W	Jefferson	Denver Mountain Park and camp where workers stayed while building the park's amphitheater.
22	Rocky Mountain National Park Administration Building (Beaver Meadows Visitor Center)	Rocky Mountain National Park Administration Building	January 3, 2001 (#01000069)	Estes Park; 40°21′59″N 105°33′40″W	Larimer	Also known as the Beaver Meadows Visitor Center, it was designed by Taliesin Associated Architects, their first major work after Frank Lloyd Wright had died. It demonstrated how modern architecture could be successful inside the National Parks and was the last significant project in Mission 66.
23	Shenandoah-Dives (Mayflower) Mill	Shenandoah-Dives (Mayflower) Mill	February 16, 2000 (#00000262)	Silverton; 37°49′44″N 107°37′39″W	San Juan	Only surviving example of a selective flotation mill in Colorado.
24^{†}	Silverton Historic District	Silverton Historic District	July 4, 1961 (#66000255)	Silverton; 37°48′46″N 107°39′46″W	San Juan	Former silver mining town, home of the Shenandoah-Dives (Mayflower) Mill and one end of the Durango-Silverton Narrow-Gauge Railroad
25^{†}	Telluride Historic District	Telluride Historic District	July 4, 1961 (#66000256)	Telluride; 37°56′15″N 107°48′45″W	San Miguel	Former gold mining boomtown, it is now a ski resort town
26	Temple Aaron	Temple Aaron	December 11, 2023 (#100009802)	Trinidad; 37°09′59″N 104°30′10″W	Las Animas	One of the oldest synagogues in Colorado
27^{†}	Trujillo Homesteads	Trujillo Homesteads	February 1, 2012 (#03001544)	Mosca; 37°44′02″N 105°44′11″W	Alamosa	Early ranch settlement (1880s) in the San Luis Valley, with a surviving period ranch house; located on a Nature Conservancy property near Great Sand Dunes National Park.
28^{†}	United States Air Force Academy, Cadet Area	United States Air Force Academy, Cadet Area	April 1, 2004 (#04000484)	Colorado Springs; 39°00′31″N 104°53′25″W	El Paso	Bold use of Modern architecture at the United States Air Force Academy, especially with the Cadet Chapel
29	Winks Panorama	Winks Panorama	December 13, 2023 (#100009805)	Pinecliffe; 39°55′16″N 105°27′25″W	Gilpin	Hotel that catered to African-American tourists during the early and middle 20th century

== See also ==
- List of protected areas of Colorado
- List of National Natural Landmarks in Colorado
- Bibliography of Colorado
- Geography of Colorado
- History of Colorado
- Index of Colorado-related articles
- List of Colorado-related lists
- Outline of Colorado
