= Shenandoah-Dives Mill =

- Shenandoah-Dives (Mayflower) Mill
- U.S. National Register of Historic Places
- U.S. National Historic Landmark
- U.S. National Historic Landmark District – Contributing property
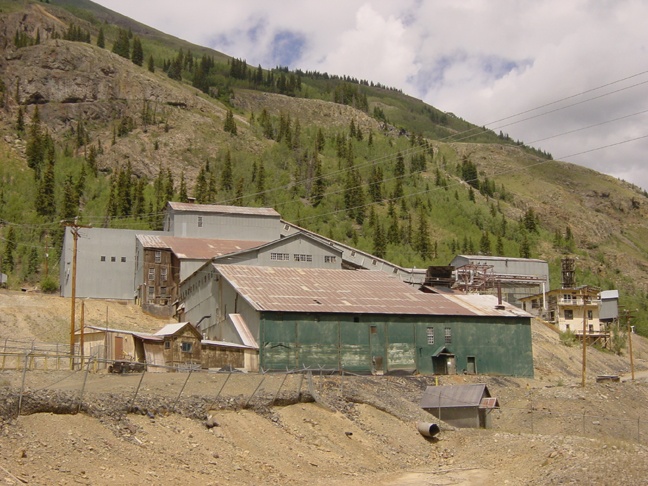

- Location within Colorado Location within the United States
- Location: San Juan County, Colorado
- Nearest city: Silverton, Colorado
- Coordinates: 37°49′44.5″N 107°37′39″W
- Area: 5 acres (2.0 ha)
- Built: 1928
- Architect: Arthur J. Weinig, Metallurgy
- Part of: Silverton Historic District (1997 increase) (ID97000247)
- NRHP reference No.: 00000262

Significant dates
- Added to NRHP: February 16, 2000
- Designated NHL: February 16, 2000
- Designated NHLDCP: April 3, 1997

The Shenandoah-Dives Mill or Mayflower Mill is an intact and functional but inactive historic ore mill 2 miles (3.2 km) east of Silverton, Colorado, United States. The mill was built in 1929 to recover gold, silver, lead, zinc, and copper from ore mined at the Mayflower mine and brought to the mill by an aerial tramway. Regularly active until 1945, it houses still-functional equipment for the separation by flotation of metals from crushed ores. It is the only intact and functional mill of its kind in Colorado. It was included in the expanded Silverton Historic District in 1997, and was declared a National Historic Landmark on its own in 2000. The mill is owned by the San Juan County Historic Society, which staffs an information and gift shop at the mill under the name Mayflower Mill. The mill is open for self-guided tours in the summer months.

== Description and history ==
The Mayflower Mill stands east of the town center of Silverton, on the north side of County Road 2 in Arrastra Gulch overlooking the Animas River. The principal mill building is a multistory wood-frame structure covered with corrugated metal roofing, its setting in the hillside designed to facilitate the feed of materials by gravitation. Many of its original window openings have been covered by metal. Attached to it are a series of smaller structures, all of which together house the ore processing infrastructure. The process includes equipment for conveying the ore, crushing it, introducing it into a large tank designed to facilitate the separation of metals by weight from the ore slurry. The mill recovered metals from the ore by gravity separation and by selective flotation. The sulfide ore minerals were concentrated by froth flotation, an innovative method in the early twentieth century that allowed processing of ores that would previously have been too difficult for feasibility. The original mill equipment is still in working order. It is the only intact and functional mill of its kind in Colorado.

The mill was built in 1929 for the Shenandoah-Dives Mining Company to process ore from the nearby Mayflower Mine. Ore from the mine was delivered to the mill via an aerial tramway over 9,000 feet (2,700 m) in length. At its peak, the mill processed 1,000 tons of ore per day. It remained in regular operation until 1945, and was largely shut down thereafter to a decrease in government demand for metals occasioned by the end of World War II. It was operated sporadically until 1992 under a variety of owners, and was then taken over by the San Juan County Historical Society as a museum.

== See also ==
- List of National Historic Landmarks in Colorado
- National Register of Historic Places listings in San Juan County, Colorado
