= Middleton, Colorado =

Unincorporated community in San Juan County, CO, USA

Middleton
- Unincorporated community
- Location within the state of Colorado
- Coordinates: 37°51′18″N 107°34′20″W
- Country: United States
- State: Colorado
- County: San Juan
- Elevation: 9,794 ft (2,985 m)
- Time zone: UTC-7 (Mountain (MST))
  - Summer (DST): UTC-6 (MDT)
- GNIS feature ID: 187624

Middleton is an unincorporated community in San Juan County, Colorado, United States. Its elevation is 9,794 feet (2,985 m).
