= Tobasco Mine and Mill =

- U.S. National Register of Historic Places
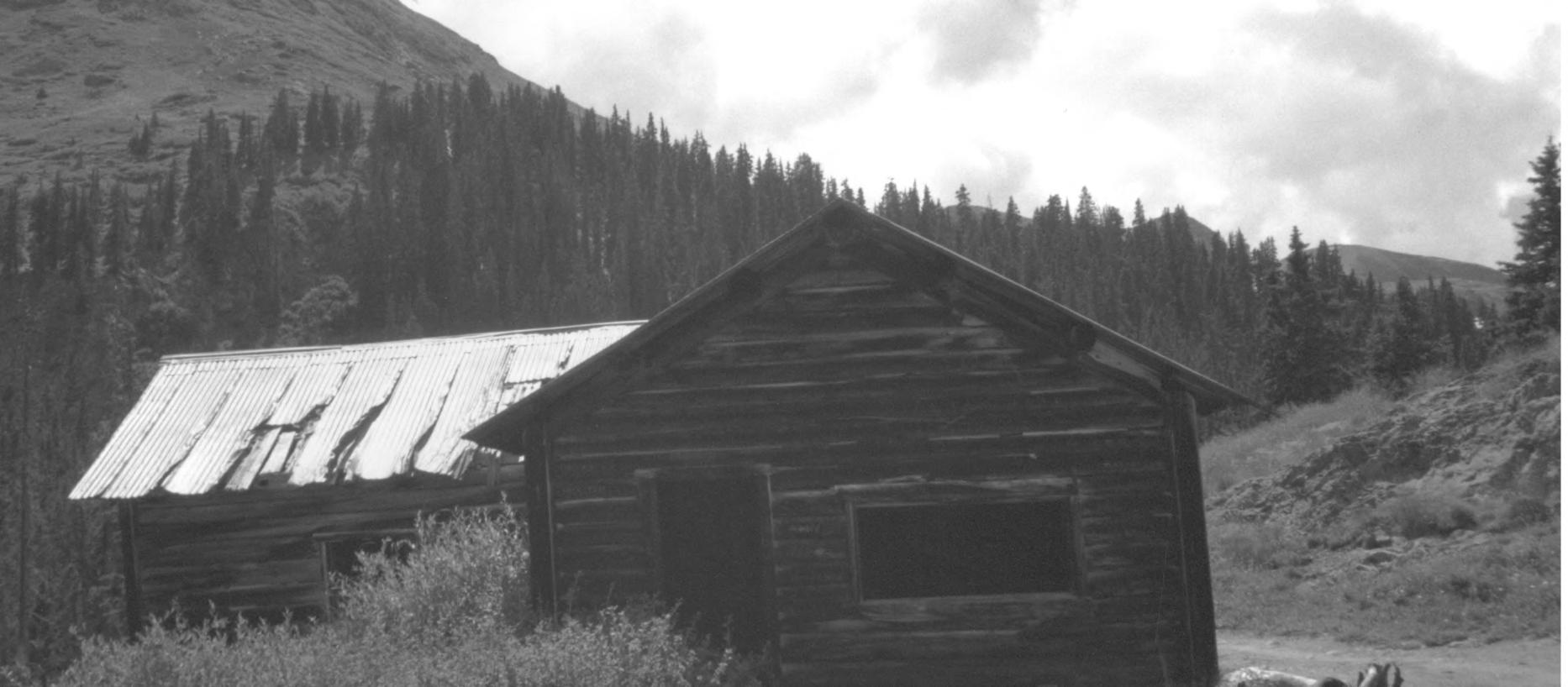
- 1998 photo of the surviving miner's cabin
- Nearest city: Lake City, Colorado
- Area: 157 acres (64 ha)
- Built: 1898
- Built by: Tobasco Gold Mining and Milling Co.
- Architectural style: Hog-trough corner log
- MPS: Hinsdale County Metal Mining MPS
- NRHP reference No.: 08000983
- Added to NRHP: October 16, 2008

The Tobasco Mine and Mill, near Lake City, Colorado was listed on the National Register of Historic Places in 2008. The listing included one contributing building, 10 contributing structures, and five contributing sites on 157 acres (64 ha).

It is located in both San Juan and Hinsdale counties, south of San Juan County Road 5 and Hinsdale County Road 34.
