= Eureka, Colorado =

Ghost town in San Juan County, Colorado, United States

- Unincorporated community
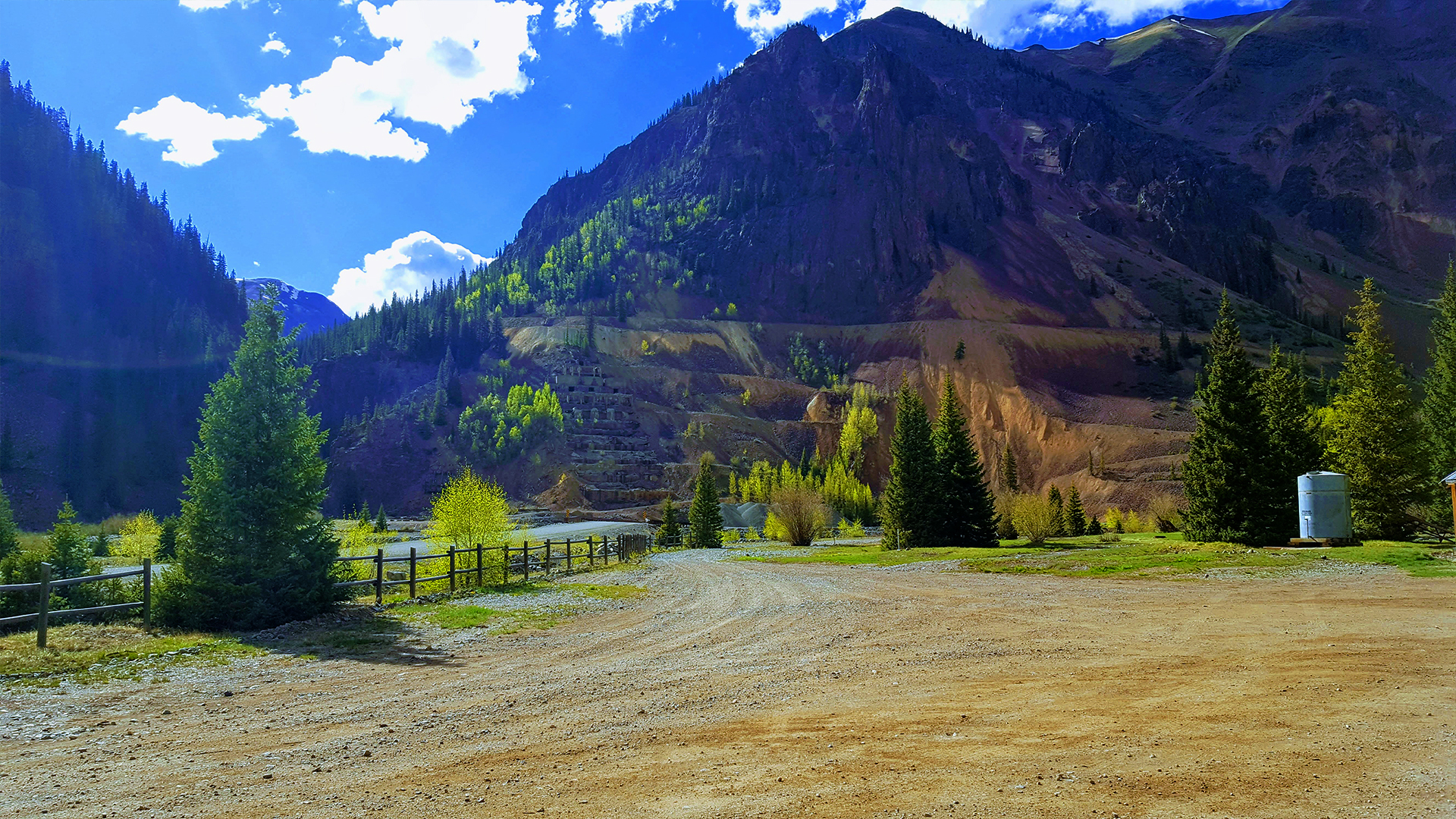
- Remains of the Sunnyside Mill in Eureka, in May 2018

- Location of Eureka, Colorado. Eureka (Colorado)
- Coordinates: 37°52′47″N 107°33′54″W
- Country: United States
- State: Colorado
- County: San Juan

Government
  - Type: Unincorporated community
  - Body: San Juan County
- Elevation: 9,863 ft (3,006 m)
- Time zone: UTC−07:00 (MST)
  - Summer (DST): UTC−06:00 (MDT)
- ZIP code: Silverton 81433
- Area codes: 970/748
- GNIS place ID: 187402

Eureka is an extinct mining town in northeastern San Juan County, Colorado, United States, along the Animas River, between Silverton and Animas Forks. The town derives its name from the Greek interjection Eureka! The Eureka post office operated from August 9, 1875, until April 30, 1942.

== History ==
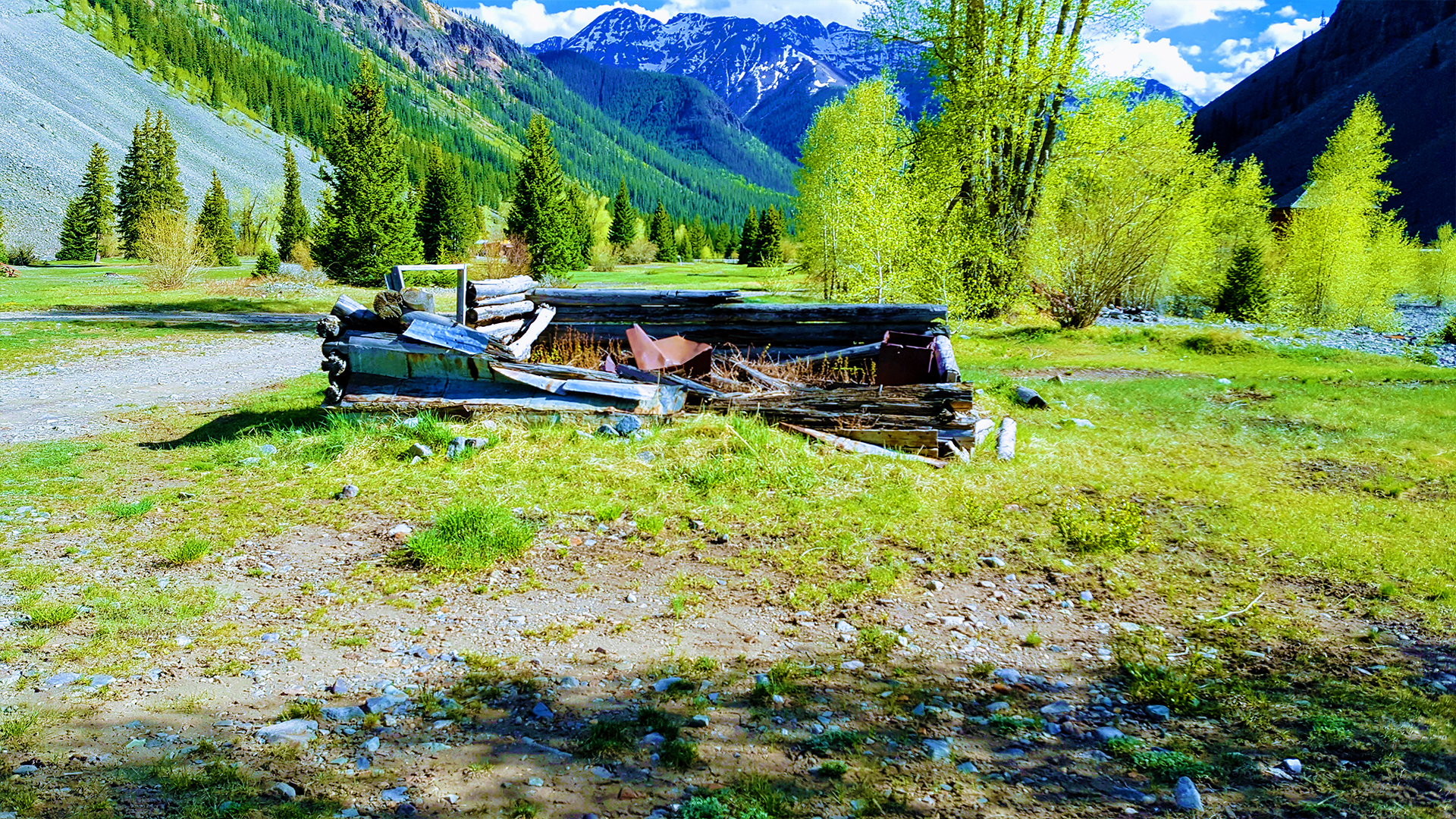
Remains of an abandoned house in Eureka, June 2019

Charles Baker's group of prospectors found traces of placer gold in the San Juan Mountains in 1860 at Eureka. Forced out by the Ute Tribe in 1861, who had been awarded the area in a US treaty, the prospectors returned in 1871, when lode gold was found in the Little Giant vein at Arrastre Gulch near Silverton, Colorado. The miners were allowed to stay after the Brunot Treaty of 13 September 1873. In exchange for giving up 4 million acres, the Southern Ute Indian Reservation received $25,000 per year. The Eureka, Colorado Territory, post office operated from August 9, 1875, until April 30, 1942. The Silverton, Colorado, post office (ZIP code 81433) now serves the area.

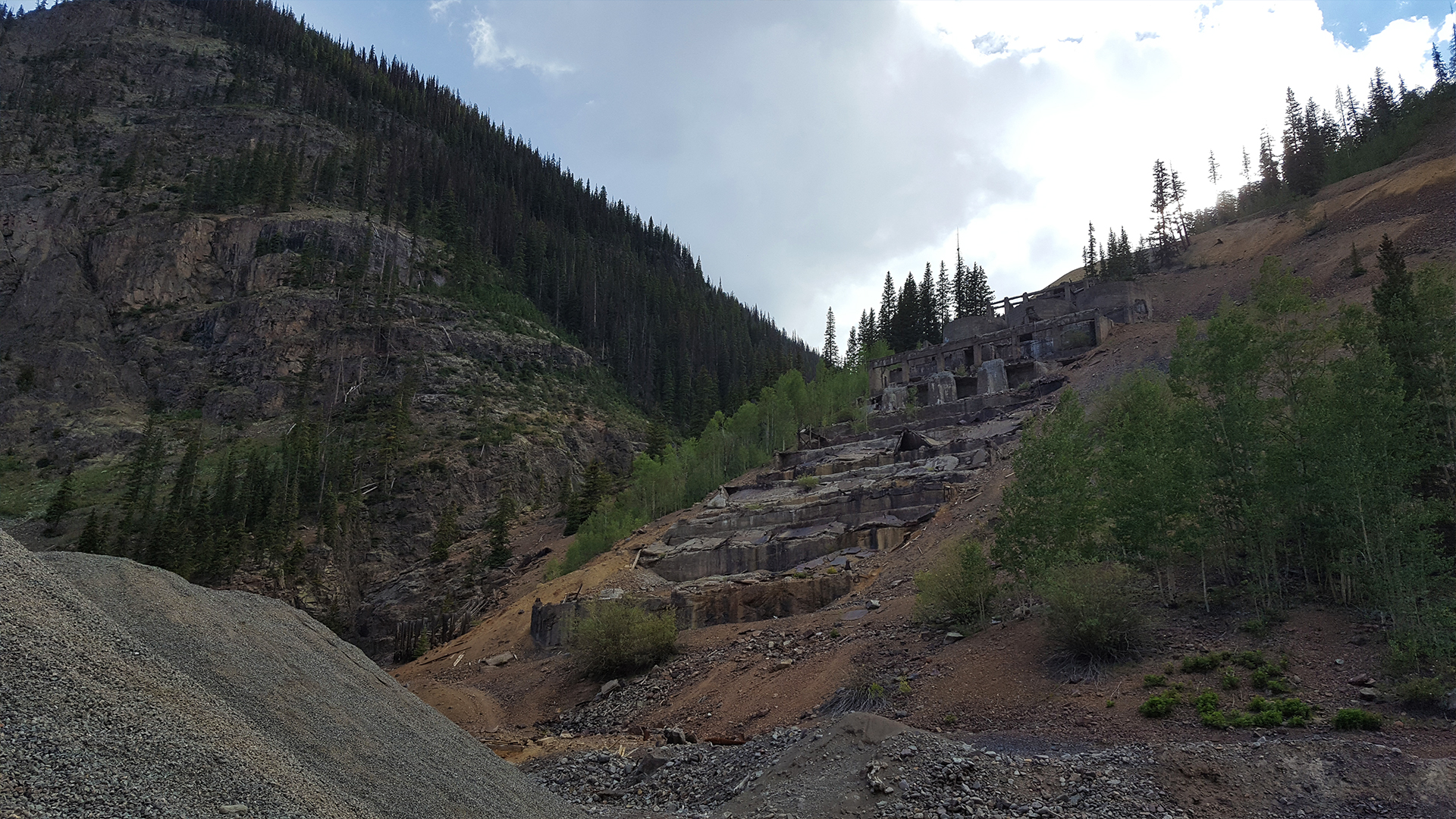
Remains of the Sunnyside Mill in Eureka, July 2020

The original mill was closed (reasons unknown) but to replace it, the Gold Prince Mill from Animas Forks was deconstructed and moved to the Eureka townsite to become the Sunnyside mill. In 1896, Eureka was connected to the Denver and Rio Grande Railroad via the Silverton Northern Railroad. Although the community grew steadily — not like a boomtown — it quickly declined after 1939, when the Sunnyside Mill closed for the last time. Today, the original townsite gravel roads remain, and debris litters the area. The only remaining structure is the Eureka jail, which has been restored. Foundations of the Sunnyside Mill and various remains of other structures still exist today.

== Geography ==
Eureka was located in northeastern San Juan County.

== See also ==
- List of ghost towns in Colorado
