= Animas Forks, Colorado =

Ghost town in San Juan County, Colorado, United States

- ghost town
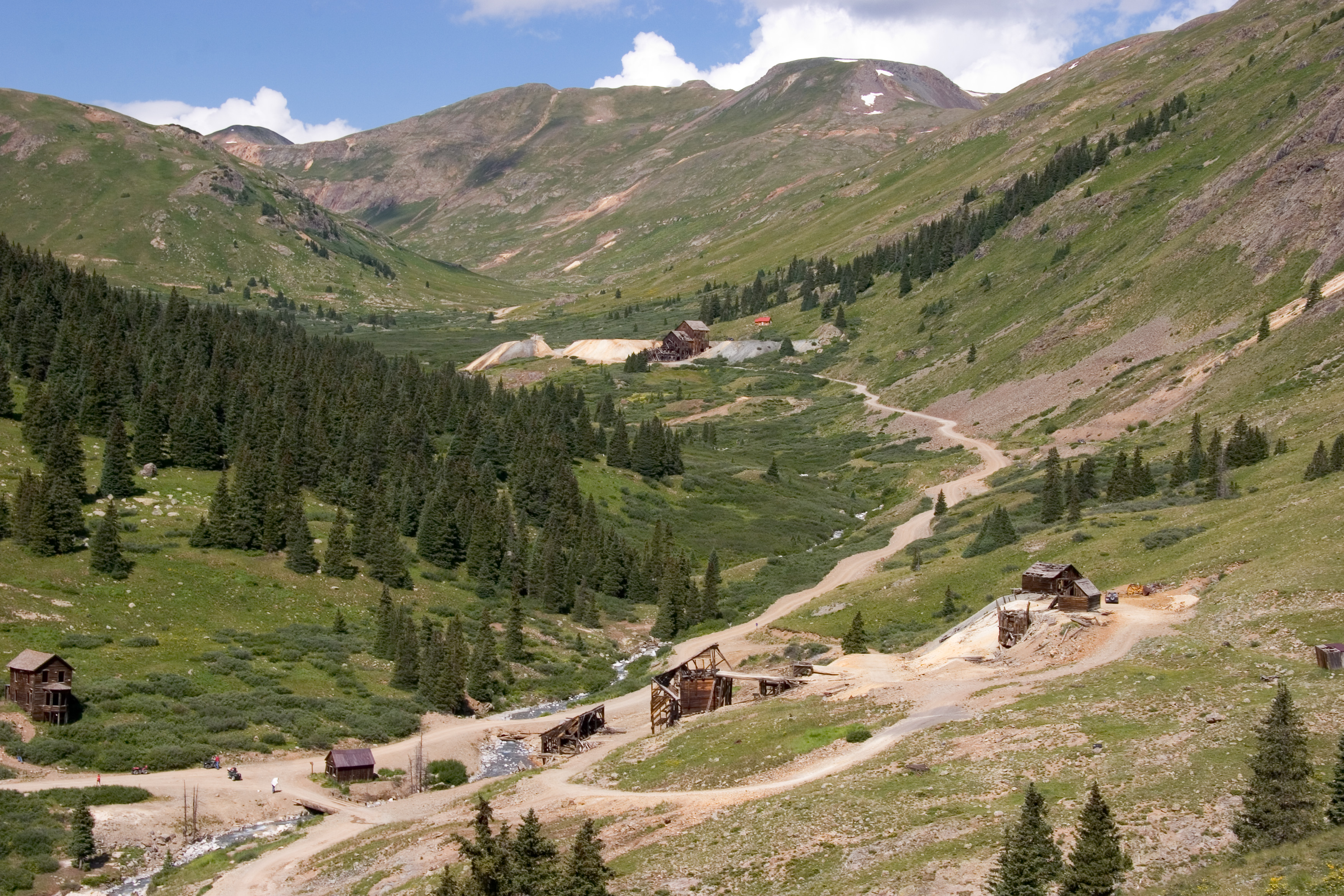

- Location of Animas Forks, Colorado. Animas Forks (Colorado)
- Coordinates: 37°55′52″N 107°34′17″W
- Country: United States
- State: Colorado
- County: San Juan

Government
  - Body: San Juan County
- Elevation: 11,185 ft (3,409 m)
- Time zone: UTC−07:00 (MST)
  - Summer (DST): UTC−06:00 (MDT)
- GNIS pop ID: 187373

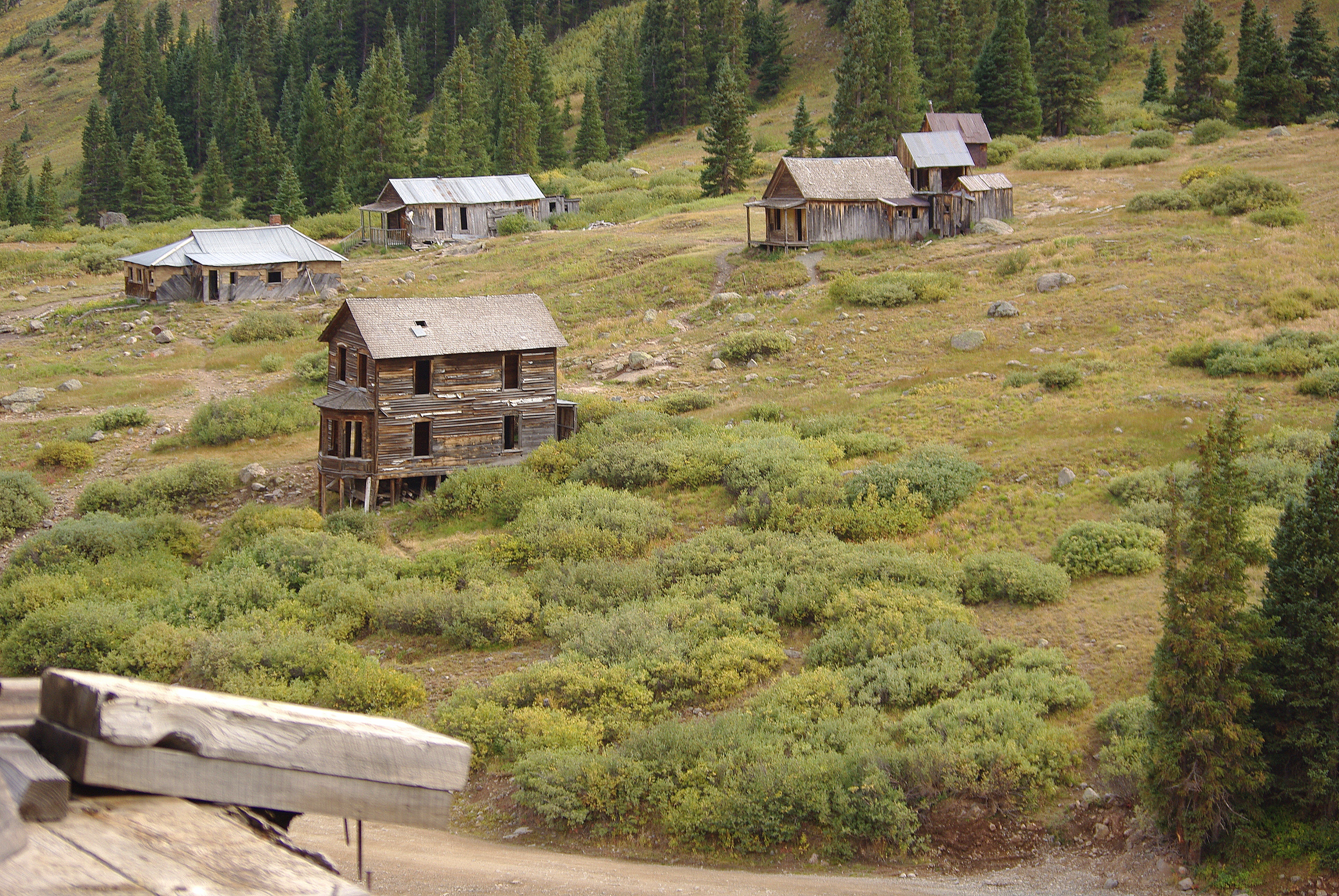
"Downtown" Animas Forks, 2009

Animas Forks is an extinct mining town located 12 miles (19 km) northeast of Silverton in San Juan County, Colorado, United States. The area is managed by the Bureau of Land Management. At an elevation of 11,185 feet (3,409 m), Animas Forks is one of the highest mining camps in North America.

== Location ==
Animas Forks is located on a system of roads known as the Alpine Loop. The loop is a 65-mile (105 km) system of unpaved roads which connects the small mountain towns of Lake City, Ouray, and Silverton. Most of the land in the area is managed by either the U.S. Forest Service or the Bureau of Land Management. Animas Forks, at an elevation of 11,200 feet (3,400 m), is more than two miles (3 km) above sea level.

The unimproved road from Silverton to Animas Forks is not passable in summer by two-wheel drive vehicles. The road is extremely rocky. The road beyond Animas Forks over Engineer Pass to Lake City does require high clearance four-wheel drive.

== History ==
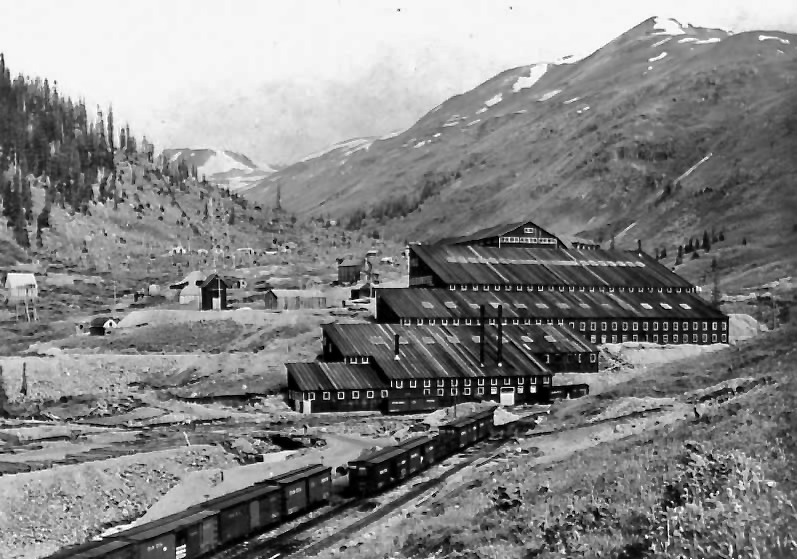
Gold Prince Mill at Animas Forks, 1915

The town's first log cabin was built in 1873, and the Animas Forks, Colorado Territory, post office opened on February 8, 1875. By statehood in 1876, the community had become a bustling mining community with 30 cabins, a hotel, a general store, and a saloon. By 1883, 450 people lived in Animas Forks and in 1882 a newspaper, the Animas Forks Pioneer, began publication and lasted until October 1886. Every fall the residents of Animas Forks migrated en masse to the warmer town of Silverton. In 1884 a 23-day blizzard inundated the town with 25 feet (7.6 m) of snow; the residents had to dig tunnels to get from building to building. Mining, speculation and processing mills helped Animas Forks grow.

=== Decline ===
When mining profits began to decline, investment in Animas Forks was no longer justified. Although mining made a brief 1904 rebound with the construction of the Gold Prince Mill the town's mining days were nearing an end. The Silverton Northern Railroad built to the area in 1896 and stimulated interest in mining in the community again but the railroad never reached its expectations. The Gold Prince Mill closed in 1910 and the Animas Forks post office closed on November 30, 1915. By 1917 most of the mill's major parts were removed for a new facility in Eureka. The mill's dismantling signalled the beginning of the end for Animas Forks. The town was a ghost town by the 1920s.

== Today ==
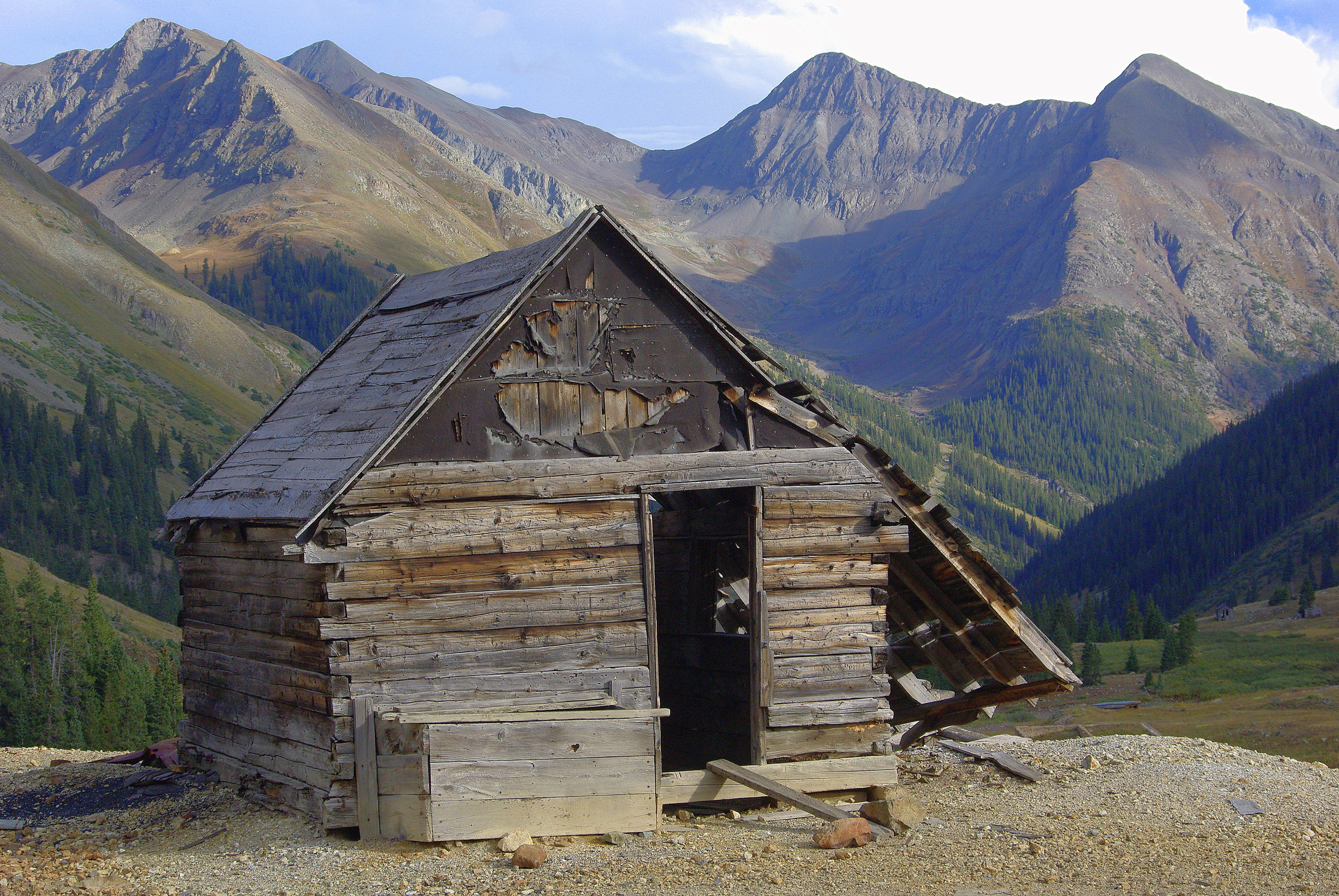
Abandoned building, Animas Forks

The site continues as a tourist attraction. A Colorado State Historical Fund grant to San Juan County, in cooperation with the Bureau of Land Management, provided for stabilization of the remaining structures in 1997 and 1998. In 2011 the townsite was listed on the National Register of Historic Places which opened up opportunities for additional funding. The initial stabilization effort of the late 1990s was followed up with a comprehensive restoration of the buildings in 2013–2014. Work identified in the 2009 Historic Structures Assessment was completed under two subsequent grants from the State Historical Fund, beginning in 2013. Work was completed in 2014, just in time for the recognition of the 25th Anniversary of the establishment of the Alpine Loop Scenic Byway.

The site was managed collaboratively by the Bureau of Land Management (BLM) and San Juan County until a long-awaited land swap was completed in 2009. The BLM is now the sole owner of the Townsite, and provides interpretive brochures and maps at an adjacent parking area. Entry into the buildings is unrestricted. The nine standing buildings within the Townsite have been stabilized and restored, repairing floors, walls, windows, and doors, to secure the envelope of each building. Cedar shingle roof sheathing has been restored on several of the buildings along with structural repairs and improvements to the drainage around the structures and across the site. The jail structure, the oldest building on the site, has had its gable roof reconstructed as part of the second phase of the project along with new interpretive signage installed in 2014.

== Historic photos, 1878 to 1904 ==
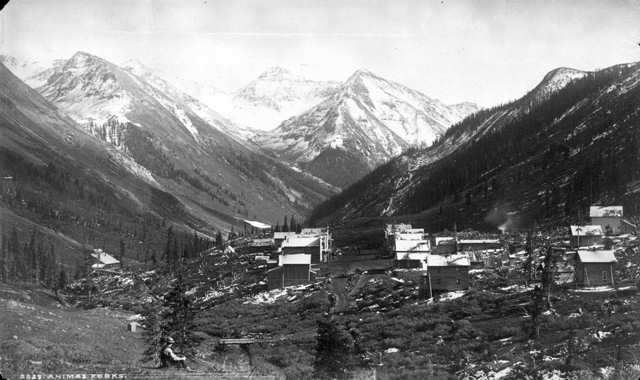
The mining community of Animas Forks in its heyday, around 1878.

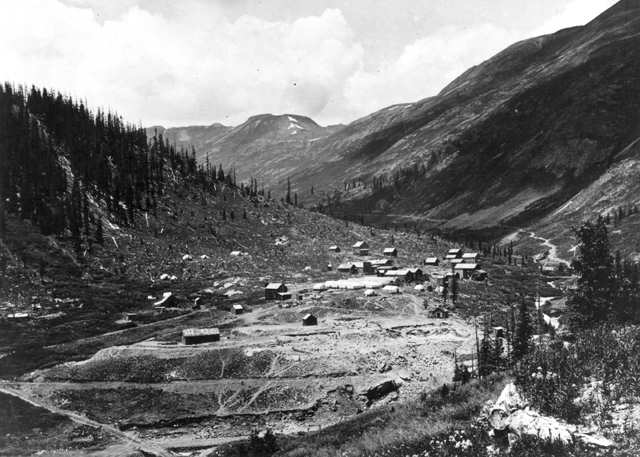
View down main street of Animas Forks in the Animas River Valley.

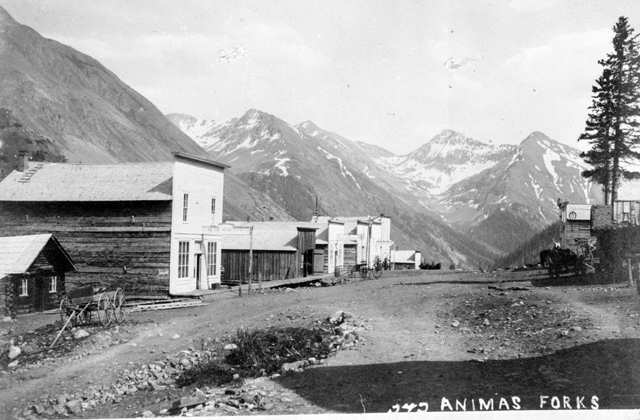
Wood buildings with false fronts line a rocky dirt street, 1880s.

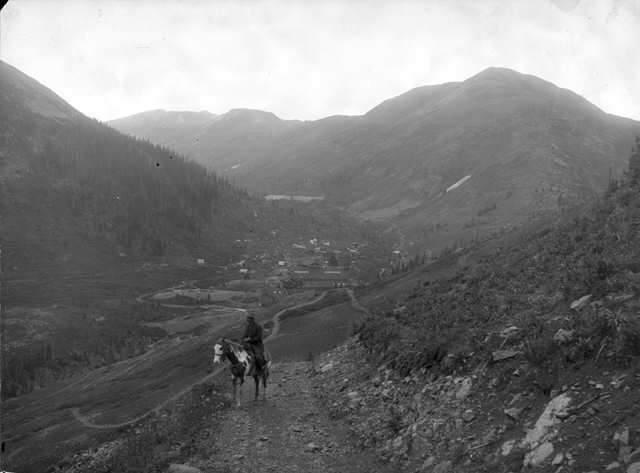
A man on a horse wearing a jacket and hat, looking out into valley from the Otto Mears road; road leads down to the town of wood-frame structures and the Gold Prince Mill. Photo circa 1888.

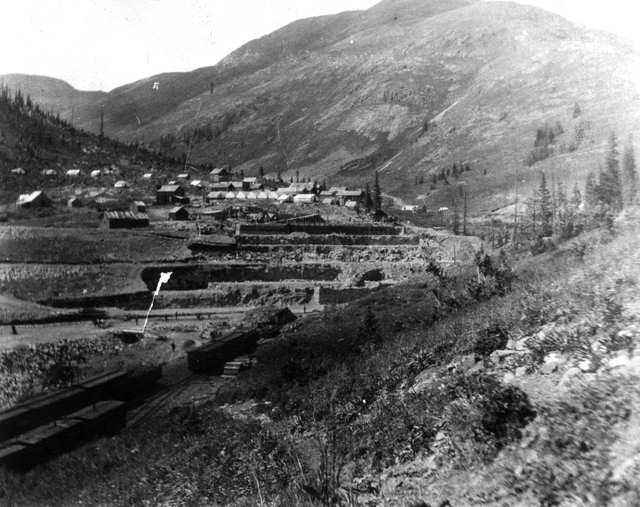
View of the Silverton Northern Railroad's trackage just below Animas Forks, Erection of the Gold Prince Mill and the town is seen in the distance.

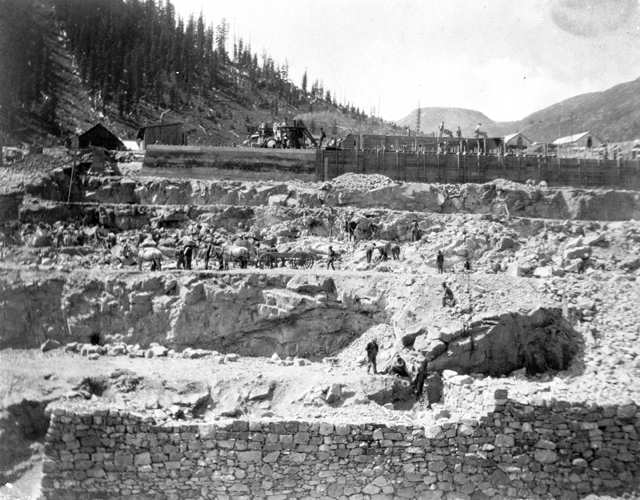
Gold Prince Mill construction, 1904: shows miners working on blasted embankments, a horse-drawn wagon, concrete forms, and a mixing plant.

== See also ==
- List of ghost towns in Colorado
