= Silverton, Colorado =

Town in Colorado, United States

- Town
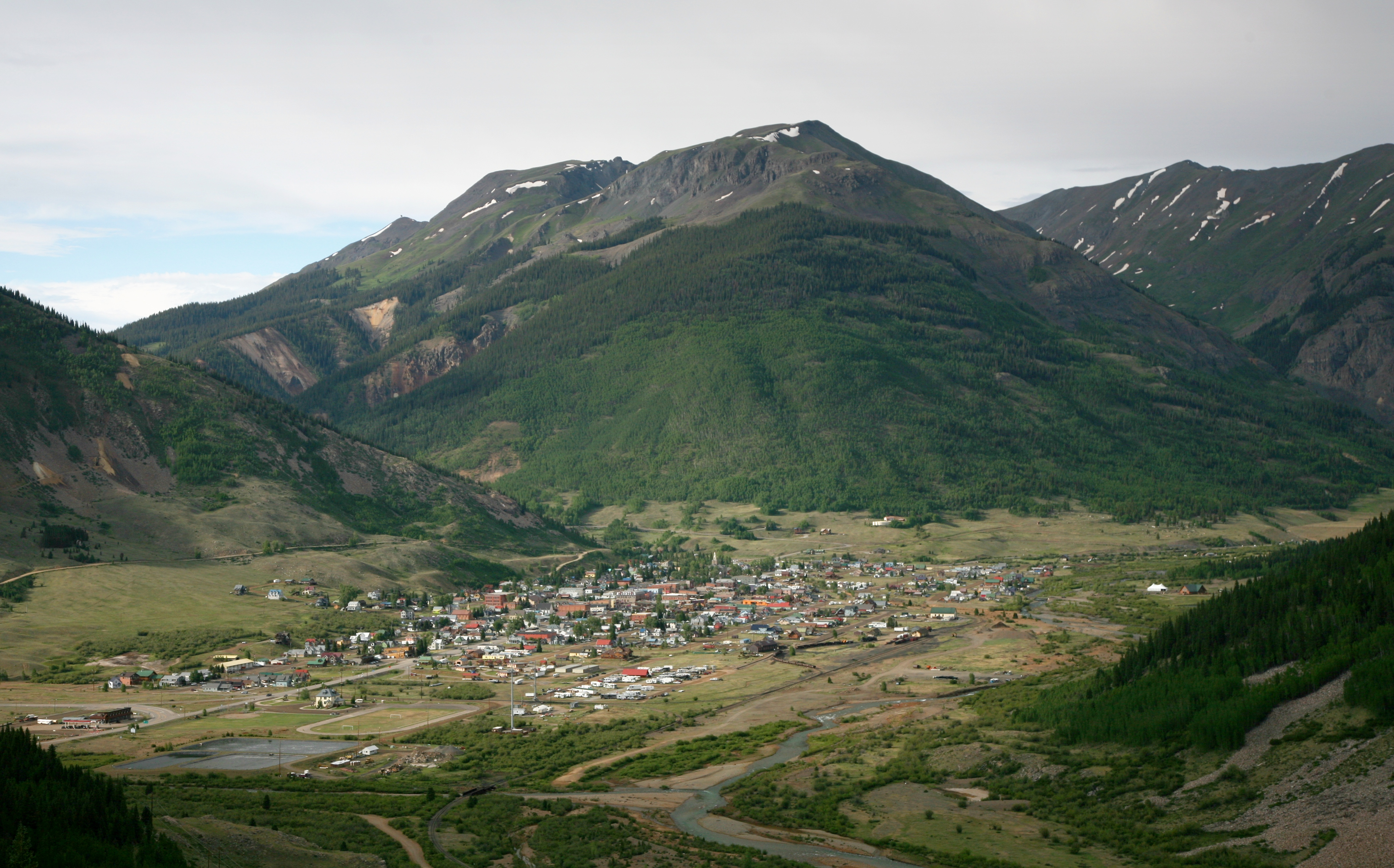

- Location of Silverton in San Juan County, Colorado.
- Coordinates: 37°48′42″N 107°39′52″W
- Country: United States
- State: Colorado
- County: San Juan
- Established: September 15, 1874
- Incorporated: November 15, 1885

Government
  - Type: Statutory town

Area
  - Total: 0.83 sq mi (2.16 km^{2})
  - Land: 0.83 sq mi (2.16 km^{2})
  - Water: 0 sq mi (0.00 km^{2})
- Elevation: 9,302 ft (2,835 m)

Population (2020)
  - Total: 622
  - Density: 746/sq mi (288/km^{2})
- Time zone: UTC-7 (Mountain (MST))
  - Summer (DST): UTC-6 (MDT)
- ZIP code: 81433 (PO Box)
- Area code: 970
- FIPS code: 08-70580
- GNIS feature ID: 2413289
- Website: townofsilverton.colorado.gov

Silverton is a statutory town that is the county seat of, the most populous community in, and the only incorporated municipality in San Juan County, Colorado, United States. The town is located in a remote part of the western San Juan Mountains, a range of the Rocky Mountains. The first mining claims were made in mountains above the Silverton in 1860, near the end of the Colorado Gold Rush and when the land was still controlled by the Utes. Silverton was established shortly after the Utes ceded the region in the 1873 Brunot Agreement, and the town boomed from silver mining until the Panic of 1893 led to a collapse of the silver market, and boomed again from gold mining until the recession caused by the Panic of 1907. The entire town is included as a federally designated National Historic Landmark District, the Silverton Historic District.

Originally called "Bakers Park", Silverton sits in a flat area of the Animas River valley and is surrounded by steep peaks. Most of the peaks surrounding Silverton are thirteeners. The highest being Storm Peak, at 13,487 feet. The town is less than 15 miles from 7 of Colorado's 53 fourteeners, and is known as one of the premier gateways into the Colorado backcountry.

Silverton's last operating mine closed in 1992. Since then the community has depended primarily on tourism and government remediation and preservation projects. Silverton is known for the Durango and Silverton Narrow Gauge Railroad, a defunct mine train that became a National Historic Landmark, and internationally recognized events such as the Hardrock Hundred Mile Endurance Run. The town population was 622 at the 2020 census.

== History ==
- Silverton Historic District
- U.S. National Register of Historic Places
- U.S. National Historic Landmark District
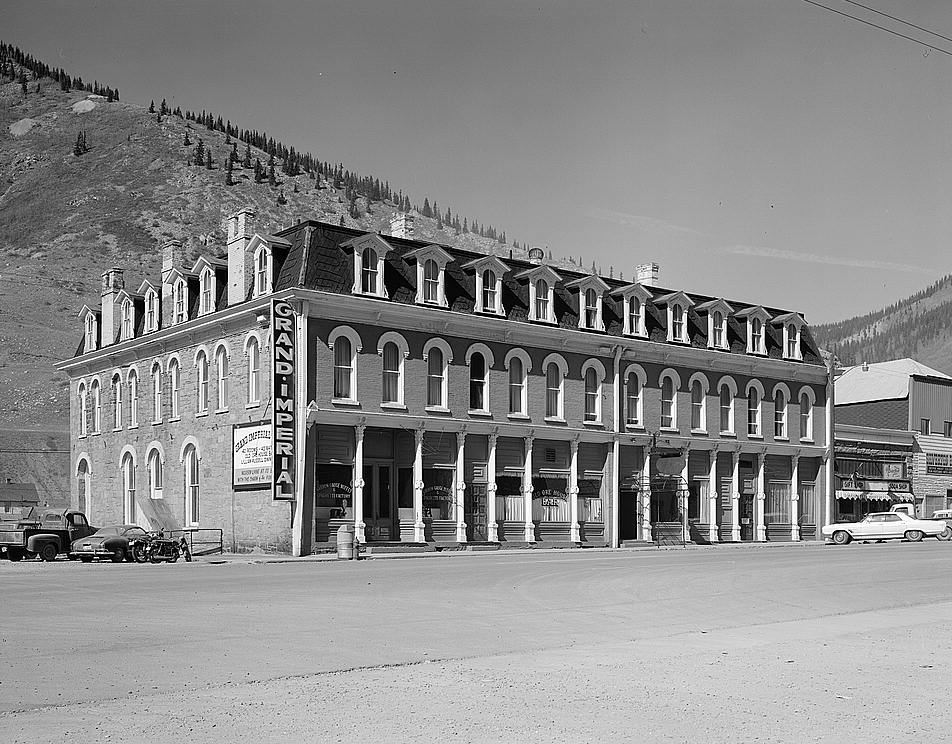
- Grand Imperial Hotel, Silverton Historic District in 1971

- Location within Colorado Location within the United States
- Location: Silverton, Colorado
- Area: 695 acres (281 ha)
- Built: 1882
- Architectural style: Late Victorian
- NRHP reference No.: 66000255 (original); 97000247 (increase)

Significant dates
- Added to NRHP: October 15, 1966
- Boundary increase: April 3, 1997
- Designated NHLD: July 4, 1961

=== Mining era ===
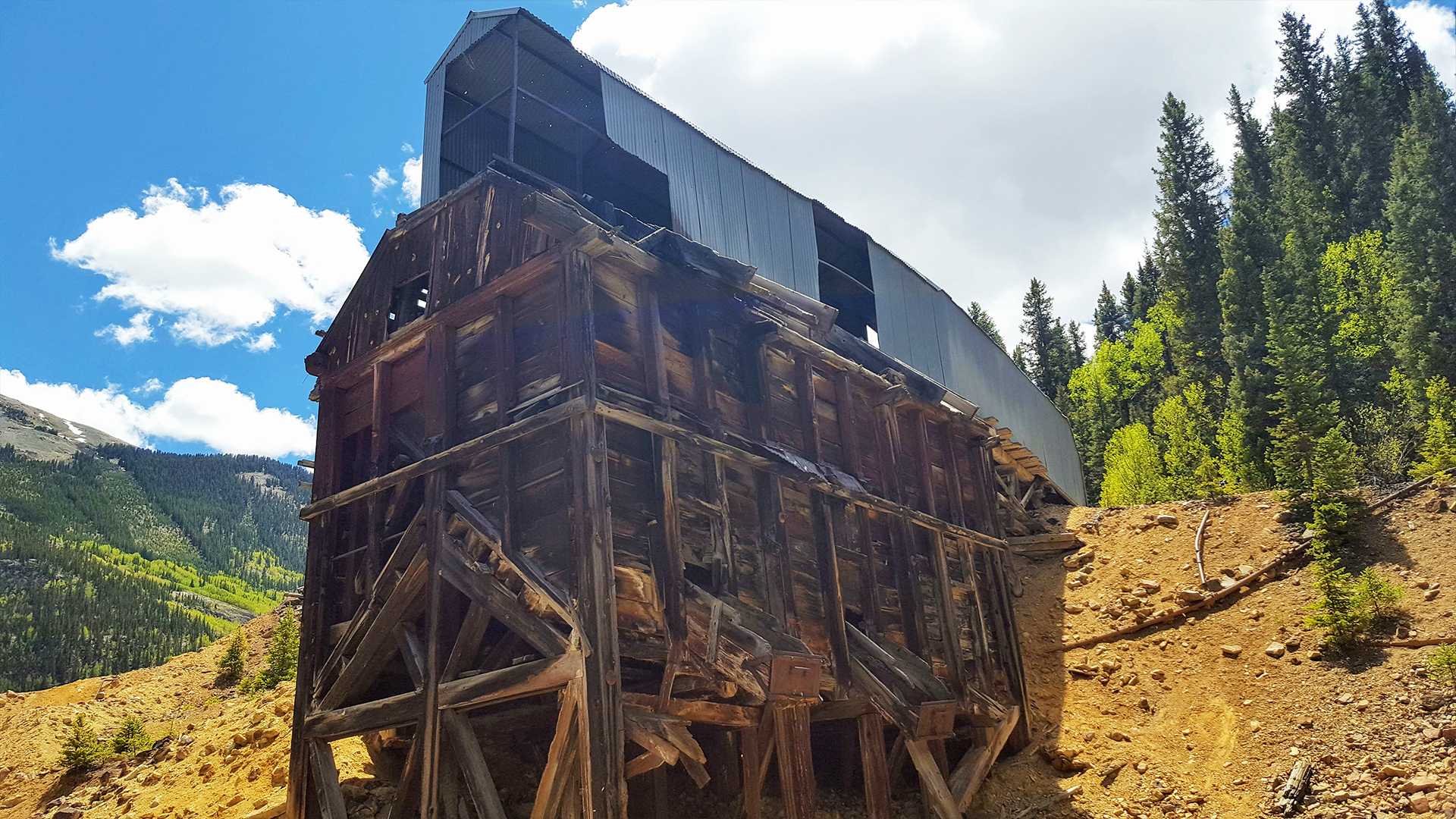
An abandoned mine in Silverton

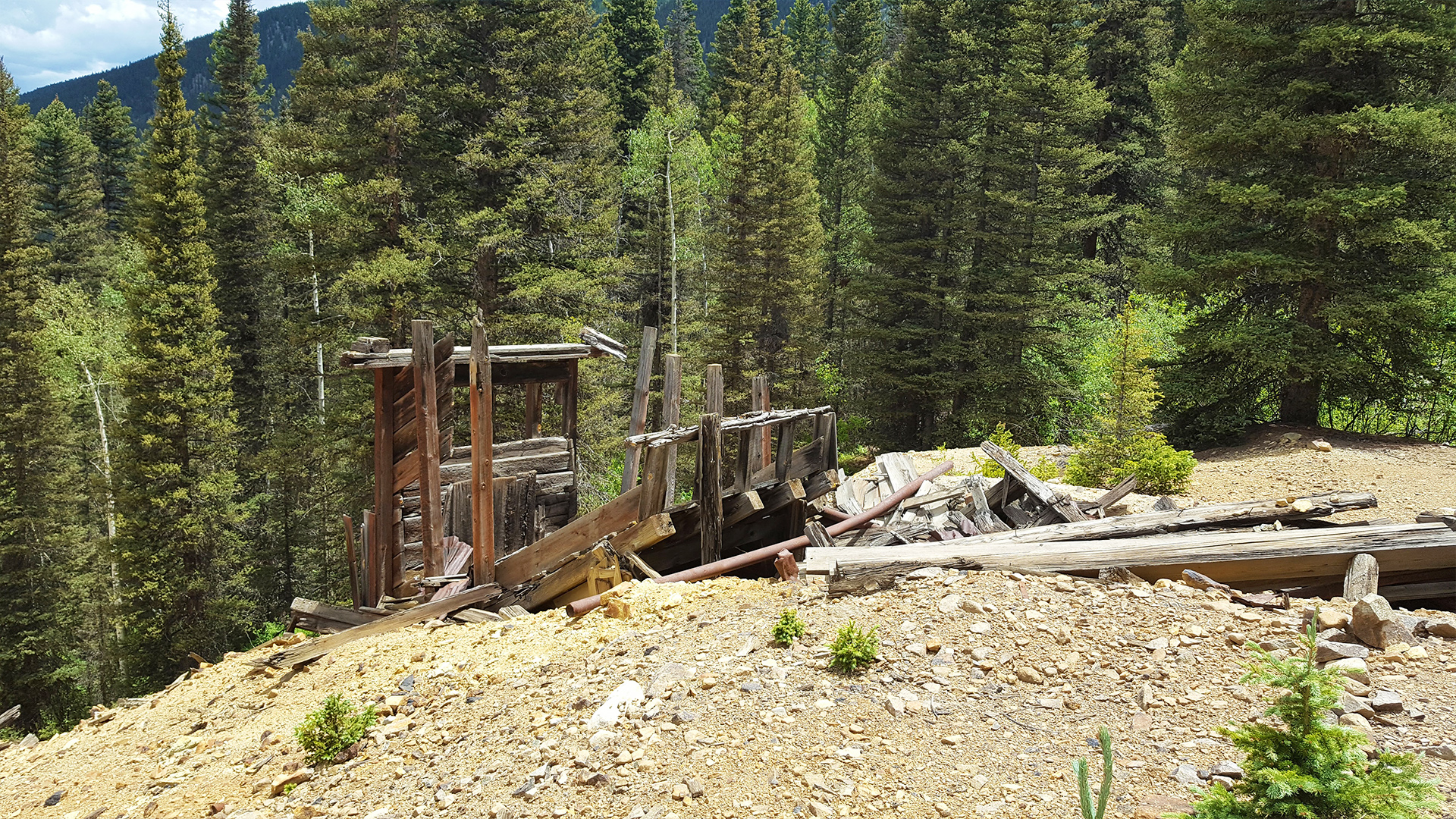
An abandoned mine just above Silverton

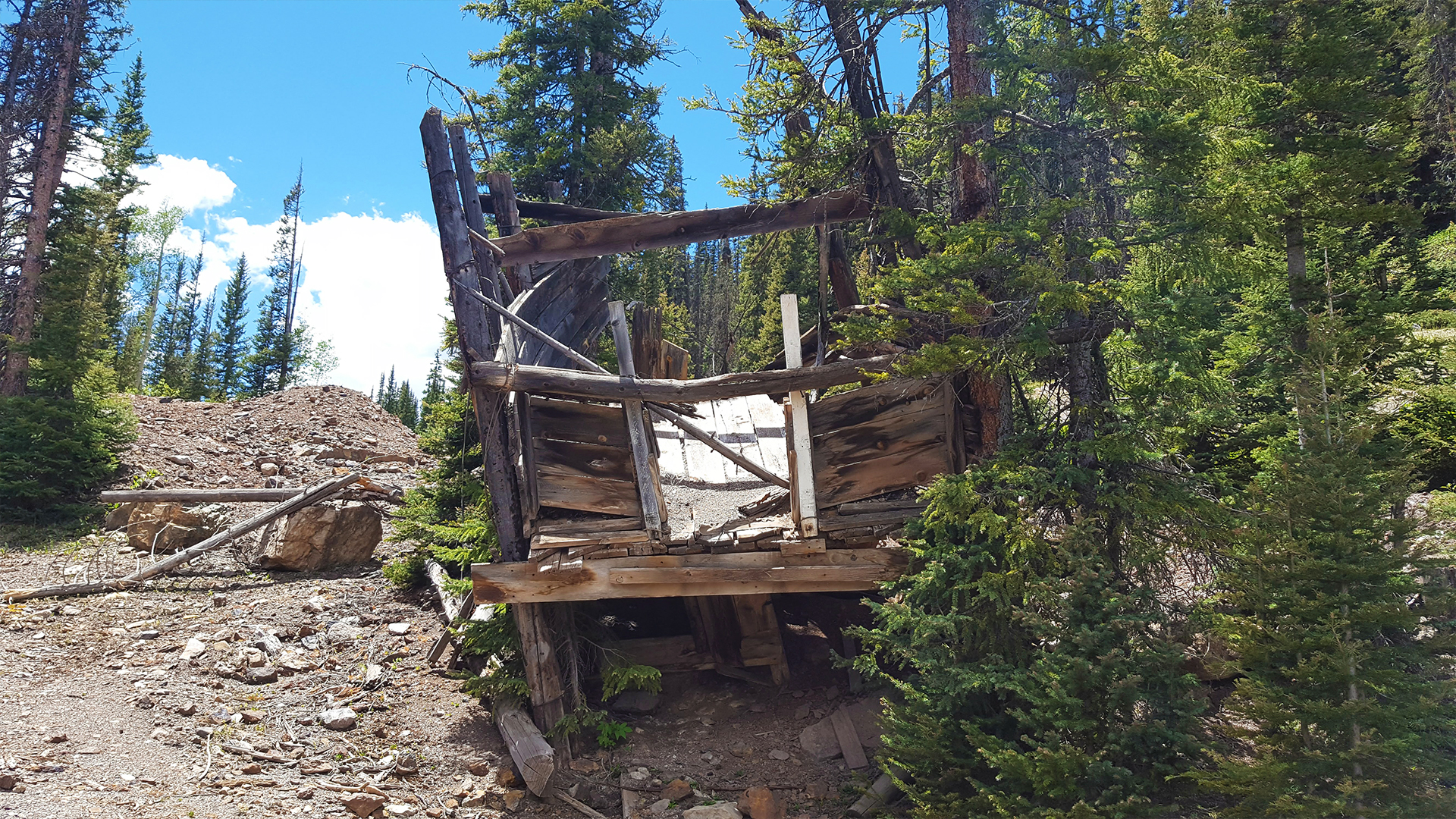
Remains of an abandoned mine's ore bin along the Million Dollar Highway between Durango & Silverton

Settlements in the area surrounding present-day Silverton began in 1860 after a group of prospectors led by Charles Baker made their way into the San Juan Mountains searching for gold. The area was soon referred to as "Baker's Park", and the group found traces of placer gold nearby.

Long before settlement, the area was regularly explored by the Anasazi, and later the Utes, who hunted and lived in the San Juans during the summer. There is also speculation that Spanish explorers and fur traders ventured into the area before Baker's 1860 expedition.

After the Brunot Agreement with the Utes in 1873, which exchanged four million acres (6,200 sq mi; 16,000 km^{2}) for the Southern Ute Indian Reservation and $25,000 per year, several mining camps were constructed. These would later become the communities of Howardsville, Eureka, and Silverton.

Silverton was founded by mining entrepreneurs William Kearnes, Dempsey Reese, and Thomas Blair in 1874. The region boomed after George Howard and R. J. McNutt discovered the Sunnyside silver vein along Hurricane Peak. Gold was then discovered in 1882, which helped the region weather the Panic of 1893 far better than other mining communities, such as Aspen or Creede. The Sunnyside Mine would become one of Colorado's longest running and most productive mines. The mine was shut down after the 1929 stock market crash, but was acquired by Standard Metals Corp. in 1959, and reopened, finding gold in 1973 with the Little Mary vein. The region's economy was dealt a devastating blow in 1992 when the mine and the corresponding Shenandoah-Dives mill, the last operating in the region, permanently closed. The closure meant the end of jobs for over one third of Silverton's workforce.

=== Tourism era ===
The town has a long history of tourism and efforts to market tourism by the Silverton Commercial Club (now the Chamber of Commerce) dates back as early as 1913. By the 1930s, interest in the “Old West” was already attracting tourists from around the world, for which the newly constructed U.S. Route 550 further enabled access. Tourism continued to increase in the latter part of the 20th century, but Silverton's harsh winters and isolation made it a summer-only attraction. Following the closure of Sunnyside, Silverton lost much of its tax base as the town's population dwindled to just over 500, a quarter of its peak population one hundred years earlier.

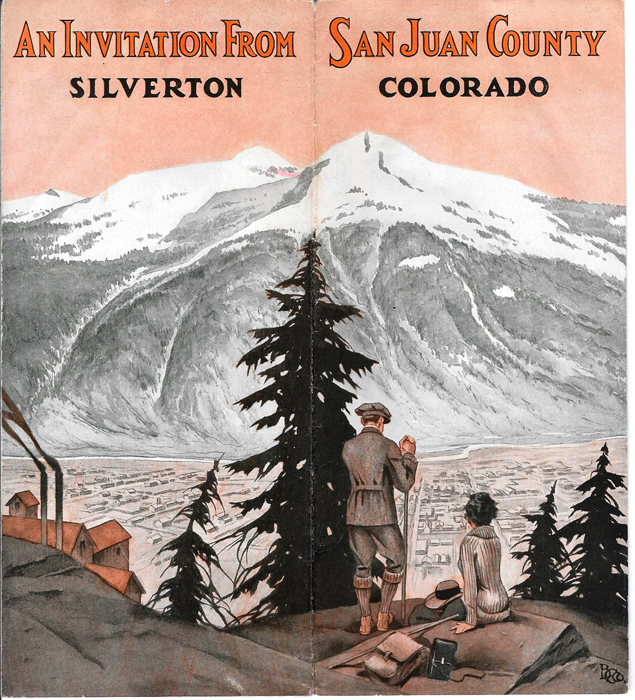
1911 Brochure inviting tourists to Silverton

The town's scenic 3 ft (0.91 m) narrow-gauge railroad, originally built by the Denver and Rio Grande Railroad (later renamed the Denver and Rio Grande Western or D&RGW) primarily to haul ore to Durango, became popular as a tourist attraction, and this traffic increased after World War II when the line was featured in several popular western films and its staff began actively promoting tourism. As mining and other rail freight declined, the D&RGW petitioned the Interstate Commerce Commission in 1960 to abandon the line, but the petition was denied due to the strong tourist traffic. In December 1968, the D&RGW discontinued service on its Alamosa–Durango line west of Antonito, Colorado, and formally abandoned the line in 1969, severing Silverton's only remaining connection to the national rail network. The Silverton–Durango line now served tourists exclusively, and in 1980, the D&RGW sold it to an independent operator who renamed it the Durango and Silverton Narrow Gauge Railroad (D&SNG). Operations continue today, bringing several trainloads of tourists to Silverton daily during operating season, and the D&SNG also operates a museum in the town.

The town's population, buoyed by strong summer tourism and an emerging winter economy, has since recovered. The construction of the expert-level ski area Silverton Mountain in 2002 marked the beginning of Silverton's year-round tourism. Another ski area, the Purgatory Resort, is marketed as being within the Durango Metropolitan Area but is actually closer to Silverton than it is to Durango. Winter festivals such as Skijoring have brought crowds that rival those in the summer, and the potential for new winter activities such as the expansion of the town-operated ski hill could permanently improve Silverton's winter tourism. The town has also become well known for its winter backcountry activities such as snowmobiling, ice climbing, and backcountry skiing.

Both the town and the rail line were designated a National Historic Landmark in 1961. In 1966, the entire town was placed on the National Register of Historic Places. These boundaries were expanded in 1997 with the addition of the Shenandoah-Dives mill and other historical structures. The town's only grocery store is the Silverton Grocery & Deli, formerly called the Greene Street Grocery.

=== Notable disasters ===
The area surrounding Silverton has been the scene of several well-documented disasters, many of them due to avalanches and mining accidents.

==== 1906 avalanches ====
Five miners perished in a slide at the Sunnyside mine in January 1906. Only a few months later, twelve miners were killed in another slide at the Shenandoah Mine, making it one of the most deadly slides in the history of Colorado.

==== 1918 influenza pandemic ====
The Spanish Flu arrived in Silverton near the end of October 1918, and quickly devastated the community. In a single week, 125 people, more than 5% of the town's population, perished from flu complications. By the time the pandemic waned the following March, 246 people had died, accounting to more than 10% of the population. This gave Silverton the dubious honor of having the highest mortality rate for the Spanish Flu in the entire nation.

==== Lake Emma disaster ====
On June 4, 1978, when the water from Lake Emma collapsed into Sunnyside mine, shooting out of a portal with a force that toppled a 20-ton locomotive. Fortunately, no injuries were reported as the disaster occurred on a Sunday when nobody was present in the mine.

==== Gold King Mine disaster ====
In 2015, the EPA and its contractors caused an environmental catastrophe when they accidentally destroyed the plug holding water trapped inside the Gold King Mine, which caused three million US gallons (eleven thousand cubic meters) of mine waste water and tailings, to flow into a tributary of the Animas River.

== Demographics ==
Historical population
Census	Pop.	Note	%±
1900	1,360		—
1910	2,153		58.3%
1920	1,150		−46.6%
1930	1,301		13.1%
1940	1,127		−13.4%
1950	1,375		22.0%
1960	822		−40.2%
1970	797		−3.0%
1980	794		−0.4%
1990	716		−9.8%
2000	531		−25.8%
2010	637		20.0%
2020	622		−2.4%

As of the census of 2000, there were 531 people, 255 households, and 149 families residing in the town. The population density was 656.0 inhabitants per square mile (253.3/km^{2}). There were 430 housing units at an average density of 531.2 units per square mile (205.1 units/km^{2}). The racial makeup of the town was 97.36% White, 0.75% Native American, 0.38% Pacific Islander, 0.75% from other races, and 0.75% from two or more races. Hispanic or Latino of any race were 7.72% of the population.

There were 255 households, out of which 24.7% had children under the age of 18 living with them, 43.5% were married couples living together, 9.4% had a female householder with no husband present, and 41.2% were non-families. 36.9% of all households were made up of individuals, and 4.7% had someone living alone who was 65 years of age or older. The average household size was 2.06 and the average family size was 2.63.

20.7% of town residents were under the age of 18, 4.0% from 18 to 24, 28.4% from 25 to 44, 39.9% from 45 to 64, and 7.0% who were 65 years of age or older. The median age was 44 years. For every 100 females, there were 108.2 males. For every 100 females age 18 and over, there were 110.5 males.

The median income for a household in the town was $30,486, and the median income for a family was $39,375. Males had a median income of $30,588 versus $19,886 for females. The per capita income for the town was $16,839. About 14.0% of families and 21.6% of the population were below the poverty line, including 29.4% of those under age 18 and 7.1% of those age 65 or over.

The local school system has a total of 53 K-through-12 students as of November 2006.

== Geography ==
According to the United States Census Bureau, the town has a total area of 0.8 square miles (2.1 km^{2}), all of it land. Silverton is one of the highest towns in the United States, at 9,318 feet (2,840 m) above sea level. The town is located in San Juan County, the highest county in the United States, with a mean elevation of 11,240 feet (3,430 meters). Silverton sits in a flat area of the Animas River valley and is surrounded by several thirteeners, the highest being Storm Peak, at 13,487 feet. The town is less than 15 miles from seven of Colorado's 53 "fourteeners", i.e., mountain peaks with a summit elevation of at least 14,000 feet (4,300 meters).

== Climate ==
Silverton has an alpine subarctic climate (Köppen climate classification Dfc) with very cold, snowy winters and mild summers with adequate precipitation year-round.

Climate data for Silverton, Colorado, 1991–2020 normals, 1904-2020 extremes: 9,285 ft (2,830 m)
Month	Jan	Feb	Mar	Apr	May	Jun	Jul	Aug	Sep	Oct	Nov	Dec	Year
Record high °F (°C)	62 (17)	61 (16)	68 (20)	72 (22)	82 (28)	96 (36)	93 (34)	92 (33)	88 (31)	78 (26)	68 (20)	65 (18)	96 (36)
Mean maximum °F (°C)	48.3 (9.1)	50.3 (10.2)	55.9 (13.3)	62.4 (16.9)	70.9 (21.6)	79.2 (26.2)	82.1 (27.8)	79.2 (26.2)	75.3 (24.1)	68.4 (20.2)	58.7 (14.8)	47.3 (8.5)	82.6 (28.1)
Mean daily maximum °F (°C)	34.4 (1.3)	36.3 (2.4)	42.7 (5.9)	48.2 (9.0)	58.4 (14.7)	70.0 (21.1)	74.7 (23.7)	71.9 (22.2)	65.6 (18.7)	55.0 (12.8)	43.0 (6.1)	33.5 (0.8)	52.8 (11.6)
Daily mean °F (°C)	14.3 (−9.8)	16.7 (−8.5)	24.4 (−4.2)	32.6 (0.3)	41.9 (5.5)	50.5 (10.3)	56.5 (13.6)	54.4 (12.4)	47.7 (8.7)	37.6 (3.1)	25.0 (−3.9)	14.4 (−9.8)	34.7 (1.5)
Mean daily minimum °F (°C)	−5.9 (−21.1)	−2.8 (−19.3)	6.1 (−14.4)	17.0 (−8.3)	25.4 (−3.7)	31.0 (−0.6)	38.3 (3.5)	37.0 (2.8)	29.7 (−1.3)	20.1 (−6.6)	7.0 (−13.9)	−4.6 (−20.3)	16.5 (−8.6)
Mean minimum °F (°C)	−21.1 (−29.5)	−18.4 (−28.0)	−11.3 (−24.1)	3.9 (−15.6)	16.7 (−8.5)	26.3 (−3.2)	32.3 (0.2)	31.7 (−0.2)	22.3 (−5.4)	9.5 (−12.5)	−11.0 (−23.9)	−19.3 (−28.5)	−23.8 (−31.0)
Record low °F (°C)	−38 (−39)	−39 (−39)	−25 (−32)	−18 (−28)	0 (−18)	14 (−10)	20 (−7)	13 (−11)	5 (−15)	−12 (−24)	−24 (−31)	−35 (−37)	−39 (−39)
Average precipitation inches (mm)	2.04 (52)	2.10 (53)	2.05 (52)	1.74 (44)	1.68 (43)	0.93 (24)	2.38 (60)	2.83 (72)	2.75 (70)	2.13 (54)	1.66 (42)	1.63 (41)	23.92 (607)
Average snowfall inches (cm)	30.80 (78.2)	28.50 (72.4)	29.40 (74.7)	18.20 (46.2)	8.20 (20.8)	0.40 (1.0)	0.0 (0.0)	0.0 (0.0)	0.50 (1.3)	7.70 (19.6)	21.50 (54.6)	27.40 (69.6)	172.6 (438.4)
Source 1: NOAA
Source 2: XMACIS (records & monthly max/mins)

Climate data for 1906-2005 Silverton, Colorado.
Month	Jan	Feb	Mar	Apr	May	Jun	Jul	Aug	Sep	Oct	Nov	Dec	Year
Mean daily maximum °F (°C)	34.0 (1.1)	36.6 (2.6)	40.6 (4.8)	47.3 (8.5)	57.6 (14.2)	67.9 (19.9)	73.1 (22.8)	70.5 (21.4)	64.7 (18.2)	55.1 (12.8)	43.2 (6.2)	35.1 (1.7)	52.2 (11.2)
Mean daily minimum °F (°C)	−1.9 (−18.8)	1.0 (−17.2)	8.1 (−13.3)	18.5 (−7.5)	26.4 (−3.1)	31.9 (−0.1)	37.9 (3.3)	37.2 (2.9)	30.3 (−0.9)	22.0 (−5.6)	9.5 (−12.5)	0.2 (−17.7)	18.4 (−7.6)
Average precipitation inches (mm)	1.68 (43)	1.75 (44)	2.30 (58)	1.72 (44)	1.46 (37)	1.39 (35)	2.72 (69)	3.10 (79)	2.81 (71)	2.34 (59)	1.49 (38)	1.73 (44)	24.50 (622)
Average snowfall inches (cm)	25.8 (66)	25.3 (64)	28.4 (72)	17.3 (44)	4.3 (11)	0.3 (0.76)	0.0 (0.0)	0.0 (0.0)	0.9 (2.3)	8.5 (22)	20.0 (51)	24.0 (61)	154.9 (393)
Source: The Western Regional Climate Center

== Notable people ==
- Bill Alsup, former IndyCar driver
- Robert Baer, author and former case officer at the Central Intelligence Agency briefly retired here.
- Anton Larson, Trooper in Teddy Roosevelt's Rough Riders, Spanish–American War
- Arthur Pink, evangelical pastor and writer, lived in Silverton briefly
- Harold Ross, founding editor of The New Yorker who was a native of Aspen, Colorado
- John Henry Slattery, Colorado politician

== In popular culture ==
Night Passage (1957) was filmed in Silverton and Durango, Colorado.

Shaun White's secret training facility for the Vancouver Olympics (2010) called "Project X" was located on Silverton Mountain.

The board game Silverton by Mayfair Games is named after this location.

For several years in the 1970s and 1980s, Silverton was the site for the International Speed-Skiing Championship.

== List of historic structures ==
Name	Year Built	Comments
Teller House, 1250 Greene Street	1896	Brewery owner Charles Fischer built the Teller House as a hotel
Alma House, 220 East 10th Street	1898	Bridget Hughes opened the Alma House in 1902 as a boarding house for miners
Silverton Train Depot, corner of 10th and Cement Street	1882	Now the Durango and Silverton Narrow Gauge Museum
Lode Theater, 1309 Greene Street	1909	Originally constructed as a saloon; in 1916 converted to the Star Theatre; in 1925 became the Gem Theatre, and in 1938 became the Lode Theatre
Bausman's Merchandise, 1303 Greene Street	1895	
San Juan County Jail, 1557 Greene Street	1902	When the jail was completed it was the third jail in Silverton. It was never used extensively; by the 1930s it was a homeless shelter. It sat vacant for 25 years and then converted into a museum.
First Congregational Church, 1070 Reese Street	1880	The steeple was added in 1892
San Juan County Water and Power Company substation/ Animas Power & Water Company	1906	Using hydroelectric power from Rockwood, Colorado, electricity was piped to this substation, where transformers distributed power to surrounding mines
Hillside Cemetery	1875	A 20-acre site on the north side of Silverton, the first recorded burial is of Rachel Farrow, a young girl who died of pneumonia; James Briggs who died in 1878 from a snow slide is the first marked grave. Of 3300 documented burials, 2000 have no identifiable markers—wooden markers have deteriorated and disappeared.
Ye Old Livery, 1120 Greene Street	1897	Built as a livery (stable for horses and mules). It had the first elevator in Silverton, and horses were lifted to the second floor while wagons were serviced on the first
County Club Saloon/Benson Block, 1208 Greene Street	1901	The corner of the building served as the County Club; since 1902 the building has served as a hotel, saloon, and one of the town's first garages.
Imperial Hotel/Grand Imperial	1882	Originally a house with private and government offices upstairs. In 1883 the third floor was converted to hotel rooms. Englishman Charles S. Thomson built this grand hotel, a two-story Italianate building with a mansard third story and prominent battery of gabled dormers. Wrought iron columns separate first-floor plate glass storefronts. Above a first story of square-cut, irregularly coursed ashlar are a second story faced in brick with rhythmical rows of arched windows and a third story with rounded dormers set in diamond-patterned sheet metal. The county courthouse occupied the second floor for several years before the present courthouse was completed. In 1950 Winfield Morton of Dallas, Texas, bought the hotel for $60,000 and spent $369,000 to convert its fifty-six rooms and three bathrooms into forty-two rooms with baths. Resplendent with Victorian fixtures, it is now a forty-room hotel with first-floor lobby, shops, dining rooms, and a splendid saloon whose cherry back bar has diamond dust mirrors set in three ornate arches originating from Corinthian capitals.
San Juan County Miners Union Hospital, 1315 Snowden Street	1902	Architect F.E. Edbrooke—whose works include the Colorado State Capitol building—designed the building in the Renaissance style
Public School, 1160 Snowden Street	1911	This building replaced the original wooden structure, which was a fire hazard. It still functions as the school for Silverton, K-12.
St. Patrick's Church, 1005 Reese Street	1905	This building replaced a frame church (1884) erected a block farther up 10th Street. Italian and Tyrolean miners donated much of the masonry work and helped construct the rectory (1906) next door. The large, square, open bell tower with a ball finial and Celtic cross and the corner minarets are unique features of this otherwise standard Romanesque Revival church with its round-arched openings, rose windows, buttresses, and rough stone foundation.
Carnegie Library, 1117 Reese Street, 1371 Greene Street	1905	Between 1883 and 1929 Andrew Carnegie, an American industrialist and philanthropist, founded 2,509 Carnegie Libraries world-wide, and 1,689 in the United States alone, representing almost one-half the total number of libraries in the United States. Most were constructed in varying architectural styles, including Beaux-Arts, Italian Renaissance, Baroque, Classical Revival, and Spanish Colonial.
Silverton City Hall, 1360 Greene Street	1908	In 1908 the bell tower collapsed while under construction. Built of Silverton's distinctive local rosy-purple sandstone, it was restored in the 1970s, then re-restored after the Thanksgiving weekend fire in 1992 caused by a heating system that kept snow off the roof. During this fire the bell tower collapsed; reconstruction took three years. The dome caps the open bell tower of this two-story building with a second-story balcony under a Neoclassical pediment supported by paired Ionic columns.
Wyman Building, 1371 Greene Street	1902	Built by Louis Wyman who in part gained his fortune by gaining contracts to haul ore from the North Star Mine. On the top corner of the building you can see the image of a burro that he had chiseled into the stone to commemorate the animal that helped make his fortune.
Church on the Hill, 1101 Snowden Street	1898	Originally built as St. John's Episcopal church, it was leased to schools for overflow classrooms until 1901. The belfry came from an old school house in the ghost town of Eureka, Colorado.
San Juan County Courthouse, 1557 Greene Street	1907	The dome sits atop this Georgian Revival monument. On the courthouse lawn is a monument imbedded with ore specimens from fifty-one local mines. Native gray sandstone was used for the foundation as well as the trim of this two-story structure of pressed gray brick, capped by a square tower with an elongated, open bell cupola. Paired Doric columns of cast stone support the entry porticos. The interior is pristine, with the original hexagonal tile mosaic floors, oak wood-work, high ceilings, signage, fixtures, and maps showing mining claims and the original town plat.
Old Arcade Trading Company, 1202 Blair Street	1929	The last bordello to be constructed on Blair Street, it sold bootleg whiskey and employed prostitutes. It has served as a pool hall, saloon, and gambling house; it is still colored orange as it was in 1929.
Silverton Meat and Produce/Brown Bear Cafe, 1129 Greene Street	1893	Was originally a butcher shop; lodging was provided upstairs. In 1933 it became the San Juan Bar. Most recently it became the Brown Bear Cafe, which has been closed.
Posey and Wingate Building, 1269 Greene Street	1880	This is the oldest commercial building in western Colorado and has been a hardware store, a bank, and a pool and billiards hall. It housed the First National Bank Silverton from 1883 to 1934.
General Store, 1304 Greene Street	1880	Built of local gray granite for the walls and a stone false front with a tiny wooden bracketed cornice. Rough-cut granite blocks form the uncoursed walls, inside and out, of this one-story building with its original triple-arch plate glass storefront, hardwood floors, and 12-foot-high ceilings. It operated as a general store until 1900 when it was converted into a saloon; after prohibition it operated as a soda fountain and confectionary store.

== See also ==
- Durango and Silverton Narrow Gauge Railroad
- Hardrock Hundred Mile Endurance Run
- Million Dollar Highway
- Old Hundred Gold Mine
- San Juan Mountains
- San Juan Skyway National Scenic Byway
- Shenandoah-Dives (Mayflower) Mill
- Alpine Loop National Back Country Byway
