= San Juan County, Colorado =

County in Colorado, United States

- County
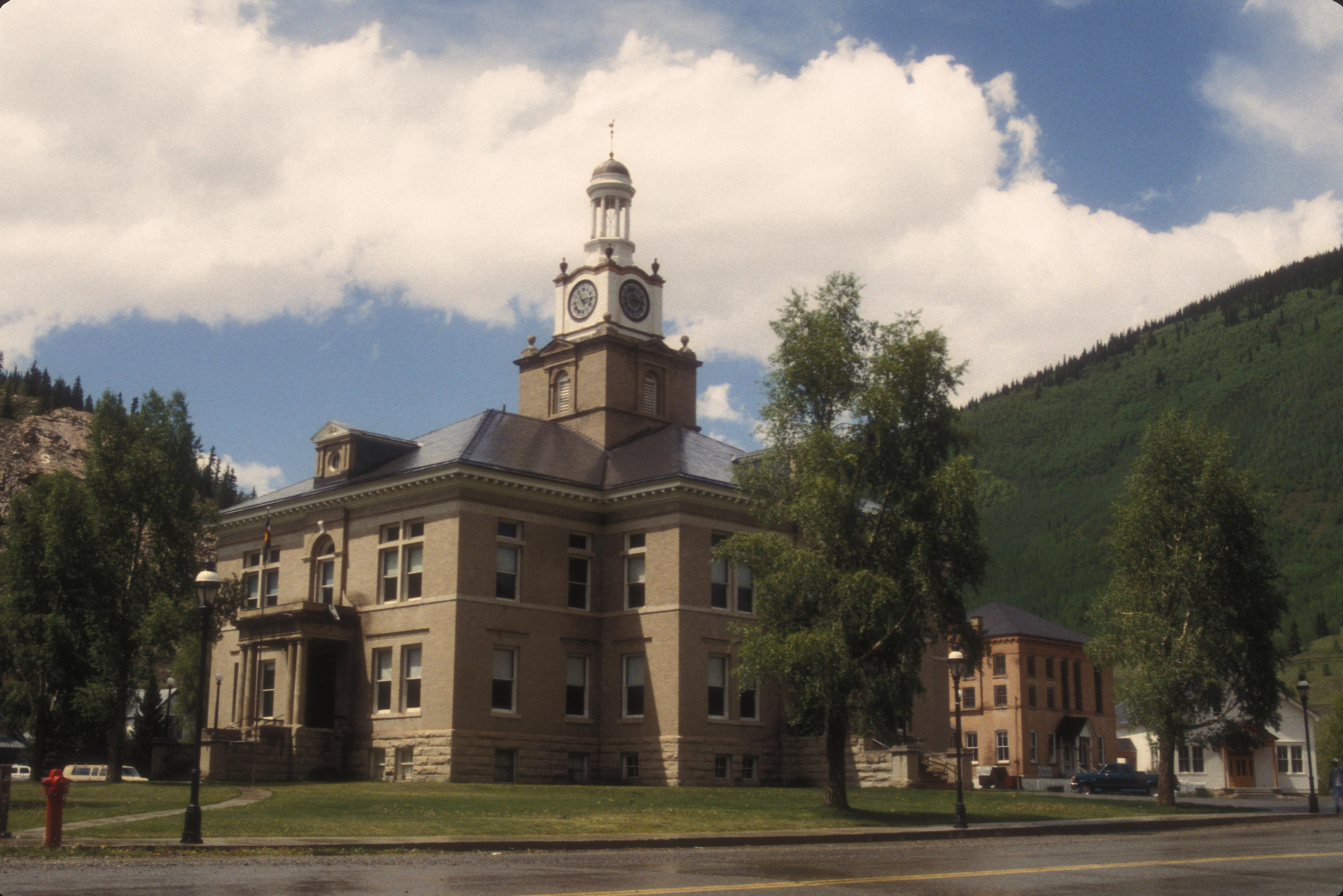
- The San Juan County Courthouse in Silverton

- Location within the U.S. state of Colorado
- Coordinates: 37.77°N 107.67°W
- Country: United States
- State: Colorado
- Founded: January 31, 1876
- Named for: San Juan River
- Seat: Silverton
- Largest town: Silverton

Area
  - Total: 388 sq mi (1,000 km^{2})
  - Land: 387 sq mi (1,000 km^{2})
  - Water: 0.8 sq mi (2.1 km^{2}) 0.2%

Population (2020)
  - Total: 705
  - Estimate (2025): 813 ▲
  - Density: 1.82/sq mi (0.703/km^{2})
- Time zone: UTC−7 (Mountain)
  - Summer (DST): UTC−6 (MDT)
- Congressional district: 3rd
- Website: sanjuancounty.colorado.gov

San Juan County is a county located in the U.S. state of Colorado. As of the 2020 census, the population was 705, making it the least populous county in Colorado. The county seat and the only incorporated municipality in the county is Silverton. The county name is the Spanish language name for "Saint John", the name Spanish explorers gave to a river and the mountain range in the area. With a mean elevation of 11,240 feet (3,430 meters), San Juan County is the highest county in the United States and also has the two highest elevation houses in the United States; the ‘Bonnie Belle’ above Animas Forks at 11,900’ – 11,950’ elevation and an unnamed house above Picayune Gulch at 12,000’ elevation.

== History ==
Long before European settlement, the area was regularly explored by the Ancestral Puebloans, and later the Utes, who hunted and lived in the San Juans during the summer. There is also speculation that Spanish explorers and fur traders ventured into the area in the 1600s and 1700s.

Permanent settlement in the area surrounding present-day San Juan County began in 1860, near the end of the Colorado Gold Rush. These first settlers were a group of prospectors led by Charles Baker, who made their way into the San Juan Mountains searching for gold.

After the Brunot Agreement with the Utes in 1873, which exchanged four million acres (6,200 sq mi; 16,000 km^{2}) for the Southern Ute Indian Reservation and $25,000 per year, several mining camps were constructed. These would later become the communities of Howardsville, Eureka, and Silverton. San Juan County was formed on January 31, 1876, from part of La Plata County.

The region boomed after George Howard and R. J. McNutt discovered the Sunnyside silver vein along Hurricane Peak, outside the mining camp of Eureka. Gold was then discovered in 1882, which helped the county weather the Panic of 1893 far better than other mining communities, such as Aspen or Creede. The Sunnyside Mine would become one of Colorado's longest running and most productive mines.

Mining operators in the San Juan mountain area of Colorado formed the San Juan District Mining Association (SJDMA) in 1903, as a direct result of a Western Federation of Miners proposal to the Telluride Mining Association for the eight-hour day, which had been approved in a referendum by 72 percent of Colorado voters. The new association consolidated the power of thirty-six mining properties in San Miguel, Ouray, and San Juan Counties. The SJDMA refused to consider any reduction in hours or increase in wages, helping to provoke a bitter strike.

The Sunnyside mine was shut down after the 1929 stock market crash, but was acquired by Standard Metals Corp. in 1959, and reopened, finding gold in 1973 with the Little Mary vein. The county's economy was dealt a devastating blow in 1992 when the mine and the corresponding Shenandoah-Dives mill, the last operating in the region, permanently closed. The closure meant the end of jobs for over one third of the county's workforce.

== Geography ==
According to the U.S. Census Bureau, the county has a total area of 388 square miles (1,000 km^{2}), of which 387 square miles (1,000 km^{2}) is land and 0.8 square miles (2.1 km^{2}) (0.2%) is water. It is the fifth-smallest county in Colorado by area. The county is located in the heart of the San Juan Mountains of Colorado. Though it has the highest mean elevation of any county in the United States, at 11,240 feet (3,430 m), none of Colorado's 53 fourteeners (mountains at least 14,000 feet in elevation) are in San Juan County.

=== Adjacent counties ===
- Ouray County – north
- Hinsdale County – east
- La Plata County – south
- Montezuma County – southwest
- Dolores County – west
- San Miguel County – northwest

=== Major highways ===
- U.S. Highway 550

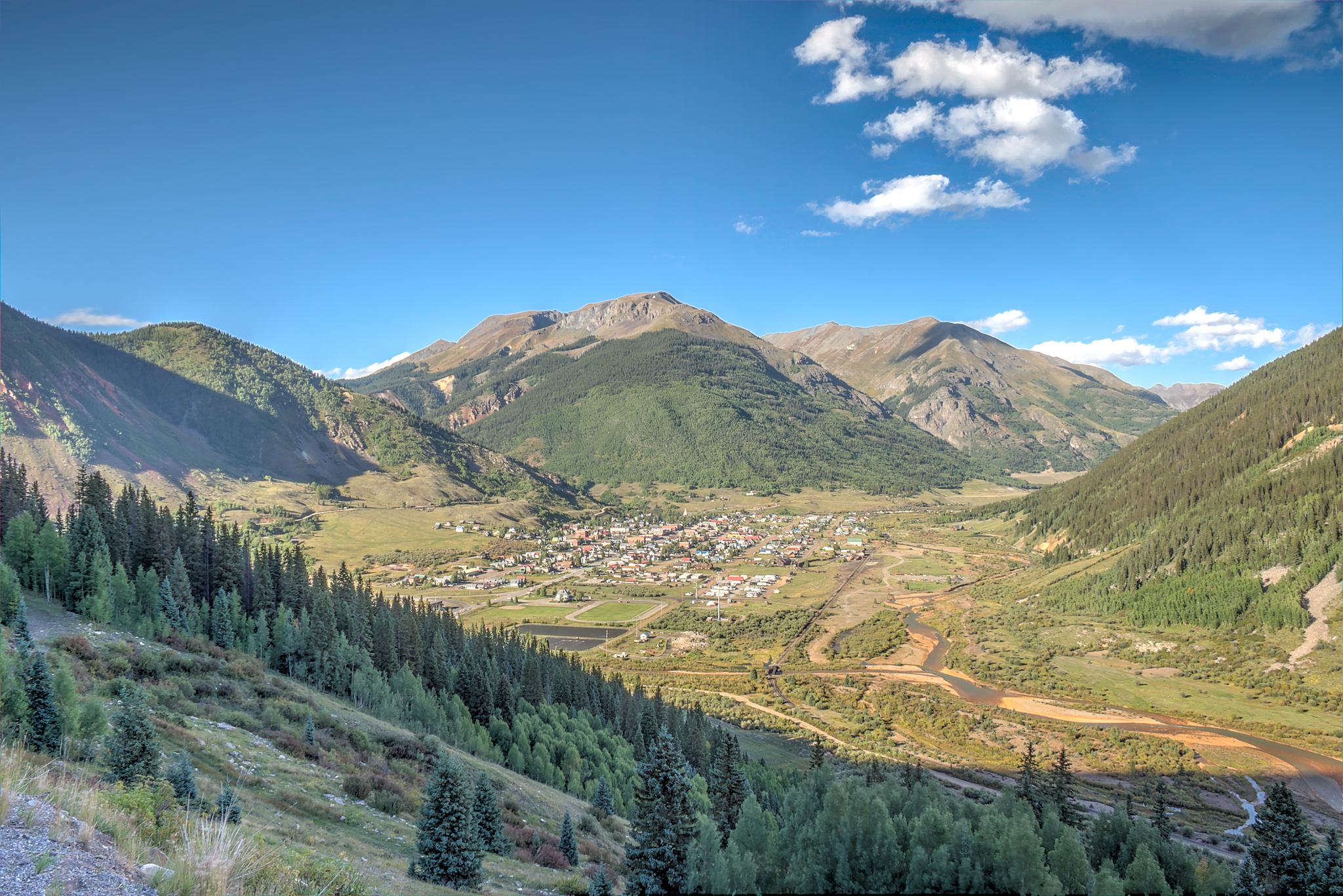
Silverton as seen from US 550

=== National protected areas ===
- Durango-Silverton Narrow-Gauge Railroad National Historic District
- Rio Grande National Forest
- San Juan National Forest
- Shenandoah-Dives (Mayflower) Mill
- Silverton National Historic District
- Uncompahgre National Forest
- Weminuche Wilderness

=== Trails and byways ===
- Alpine Loop National Back Country Byway
- Colorado Trail
- Continental Divide National Scenic Trail
- San Juan Skyway National Scenic Byway

== Demographics ==
Historical population
Census	Pop.	Note	%±
1880	1,087		—
1890	1,572		44.6%
1900	2,342		49.0%
1910	3,063		30.8%
1920	1,700		−44.5%
1930	1,935		13.8%
1940	1,439		−25.6%
1950	1,471		2.2%
1960	849		−42.3%
1970	831		−2.1%
1980	833		0.2%
1990	745		−10.6%
2000	558		−25.1%
2010	699		25.3%
2020	705		0.9%
2025 (est.)	813	▲	15.3%
U.S. Decennial Census; 1790–1960 1900–1990; 1990–2000 2010–2020

=== 2020 census ===
As of the 2020 census, the county had a population of 705. Of the residents, 14.9% were under the age of 18 and 23.4% were 65 years of age or older; the median age was 47.5 years. For every 100 females there were 116.3 males, and for every 100 females age 18 and over there were 115.1 males. 0.0% of residents lived in urban areas and 100.0% lived in rural areas.

San Juan County, Colorado – Racial and ethnic composition Note: the US Census treats Hispanic/Latino as an ethnic category. This table excludes Latinos from the racial categories and assigns them to a separate category. Hispanics/Latinos may be of any race.
Race / Ethnicity (NH = Non-Hispanic)	Pop 2000	Pop 2010	Pop 2020	% 2000	% 2010	% 2020
White alone (NH)	509	595	575	91.22%	85.12%	81.56%
Black or African American alone (NH)	0	0	1	0.00%	0.00%	0.14%
Native American or Alaska Native alone (NH)	2	1	6	0.36%	0.14%	0.85%
Asian alone (NH)	1	7	2	0.18%	1.00%	0.28%
Pacific Islander alone (NH)	2	0	0	0.36%	0.00%	0.00%
Other race alone (NH)	1	2	1	0.18%	0.29%	0.14%
Mixed race or Multiracial (NH)	2	10	30	0.36%	1.43%	4.26%
Hispanic or Latino (any race)	41	84	90	7.35%	12.02%	12.77%
Total	558	699	705	100.00%	100.00%	100.00%

The racial makeup of the county was 86.0% White, 0.4% Black or African American, 0.9% American Indian and Alaska Native, 0.3% Asian, 0.0% Native Hawaiian and Pacific Islander, 1.6% from some other race, and 10.9% from two or more races. Hispanic or Latino residents of any race comprised 12.8% of the population.

There were 369 households in the county, of which 22.5% had children under the age of 18 living with them and 20.3% had a female householder with no spouse or partner present. About 39.6% of all households were made up of individuals and 15.2% had someone living alone who was 65 years of age or older.

There were 779 housing units, of which 52.6% were vacant. Among occupied housing units, 61.5% were owner-occupied and 38.5% were renter-occupied. The homeowner vacancy rate was 3.7% and the rental vacancy rate was 33.6%.

=== 2000 census ===
As of the census of 2000, there were 558 people, 269 households, and 157 families residing in the county. The population density was one person per square mile (0.39 person/km^{2}). There were 632 housing units at an average density of 2 per square mile (0.77/km^{2}). The racial makeup of the county was 97.13% White, 0.72% Native American, 0.18% Asian, 0.36% Pacific Islander, 0.72% from other races, and 0.90% from two or more races. 7.35% of the population were Hispanic or Latino of any race.

There were 269 households, out of which 23.80% had children under the age of 18 living with them, 43.90% were married couples living together, 8.90% had a female householder with no husband present, and 41.30% were non-families. 36.80% of all households were made up of individuals, and 4.80% had someone living alone who was 65 years of age or older. The average household size was 2.06 and the average family size was 2.63.

In the county, the population was spread out, with 20.10% under the age of 18, 4.30% from 18 to 24, 28.10% from 25 to 44, 40.50% from 45 to 64, and 7.00% who were 65 years of age or older. The median age was 44 years. For every 100 females, there were 110.60 males. For every 100 females age 18 and over, there were 112.40 males.

The median income for a household in the county was $30,764, and the median income for a family was $40,000. Males had a median income of $30,588 versus $19,545 for females. The per capita income for the county was $17,584. About 13.50% of families and 20.90% of the population were below the poverty line, including 29.40% of those under age 18 and 7.10% of those age 65 or over.

San Juan county is the only county outside Alaska where walking is the most common form of commute to work. As of 2013, 33% of residents walked to work, 18% drove alone, 19% carpooled, and 18% bicycled, though the small population size introduces considerable margins of error to these statistics.

As of November 2006, the one and only local school had 53 students in grades K–12.

== Communities ==
=== Town ===
- Silverton

=== Unincorporated communities ===
- Howardsville
- Middleton
- Needleton

== Former communities ==
- Animas Forks (restored ghost town)
- Eureka (ghost town)

== Politics ==
In the era of William Jennings Bryan, San Juan County strongly favored the Democratic Party: no Republican managed to carry the county between 1892 and 1916, and it was even one of the few northern or western counties to vote for Alton B. Parker in 1904. It remained a Democratic-leaning county until the 1960s but then turned towards the Republican Party in subsequent decades. No Democratic presidential nominee won San Juan County between 1968 and 2000, although it was one of fifteen rural or remote counties to give a plurality to Ross Perot in 1992. Since John Kerry carried the county for his party for the first time in four decades at the 2004 election, San Juan County has voted Democratic at the last five Presidential elections. After 2016, the county shifted even more heavily Democratic than before, with Joe Biden and Kamala Harris each subsequently receiving the highest percentage of the vote for Democrats since the 1964 Democratic national landslide.

United States presidential election results for San Juan County, Colorado
Year	Republican		Democratic		Third party(ies)	
Year	No.	%	No.	%	No.	%
1880	224	52.71%	196	46.12%	5	1.18%
1884	664	57.24%	473	40.78%	23	1.98%
1888	392	55.21%	287	40.42%	31	4.37%
1892	96	16.52%	0	0.00%	485	83.48%
1896	17	1.09%	1,535	98.71%	3	0.19%
1900	362	23.78%	1,135	74.57%	25	1.64%
1904	708	42.88%	899	54.45%	44	2.67%
1908	547	38.52%	774	54.51%	99	6.97%
1912	231	22.49%	555	54.04%	241	23.47%
1916	214	21.62%	693	70.00%	83	8.38%
1920	330	50.46%	290	44.34%	34	5.20%
1924	218	39.78%	206	37.59%	124	22.63%
1928	277	37.13%	436	58.45%	33	4.42%
1932	160	22.44%	544	76.30%	9	1.26%
1936	196	23.61%	622	74.94%	12	1.45%
1940	452	54.20%	378	45.32%	4	0.48%
1944	328	55.88%	258	43.95%	1	0.17%
1948	329	47.00%	348	49.71%	23	3.29%
1952	432	56.77%	327	42.97%	2	0.26%
1956	324	58.38%	231	41.62%	0	0.00%
1960	218	45.23%	261	54.15%	3	0.62%
1964	129	31.70%	278	68.30%	0	0.00%
1968	165	46.09%	134	37.43%	59	16.48%
1972	238	58.33%	140	34.31%	30	7.35%
1976	221	53.77%	167	40.63%	23	5.60%
1980	268	48.82%	146	26.59%	135	24.59%
1984	320	61.66%	183	35.26%	16	3.08%
1988	210	50.36%	192	46.04%	15	3.60%
1992	118	26.05%	147	32.45%	188	41.50%
1996	153	41.35%	133	35.95%	84	22.70%
2000	210	48.17%	149	34.17%	77	17.66%
2004	216	44.44%	253	52.06%	17	3.50%
2008	218	43.95%	264	53.23%	14	2.82%
2012	212	41.90%	266	52.57%	28	5.53%
2016	215	42.49%	265	52.37%	26	5.14%
2020	202	35.94%	342	60.85%	18	3.20%
2024	188	31.92%	376	63.84%	25	4.24%

United States Senate election results for San Juan County, Colorado2
Year	Republican		Democratic		Third party(ies)	
Year	No.	%	No.	%	No.	%
2020	207	37.64%	328	59.64%	15	2.73%

United States Senate election results for San Juan County, Colorado3
Year	Republican		Democratic		Third party(ies)	
Year	No.	%	No.	%	No.	%
2022	164	30.48%	350	65.06%	24	4.46%

Colorado Gubernatorial election results for San Juan County
Year	Republican		Democratic		Third party(ies)	
Year	No.	%	No.	%	No.	%
2022	154	28.52%	372	68.89%	14	2.59%

== See also ==
- Bibliography of Colorado
- Geography of Colorado
- History of Colorado
  - National Register of Historic Places listings in San Juan County, Colorado
- Index of Colorado-related articles
- List of Colorado-related lists
  - List of counties in Colorado
- Outline of Colorado
