= Baldy Cinco =

Mountain in the state of Colorado

- Mt. Baldy Cinco
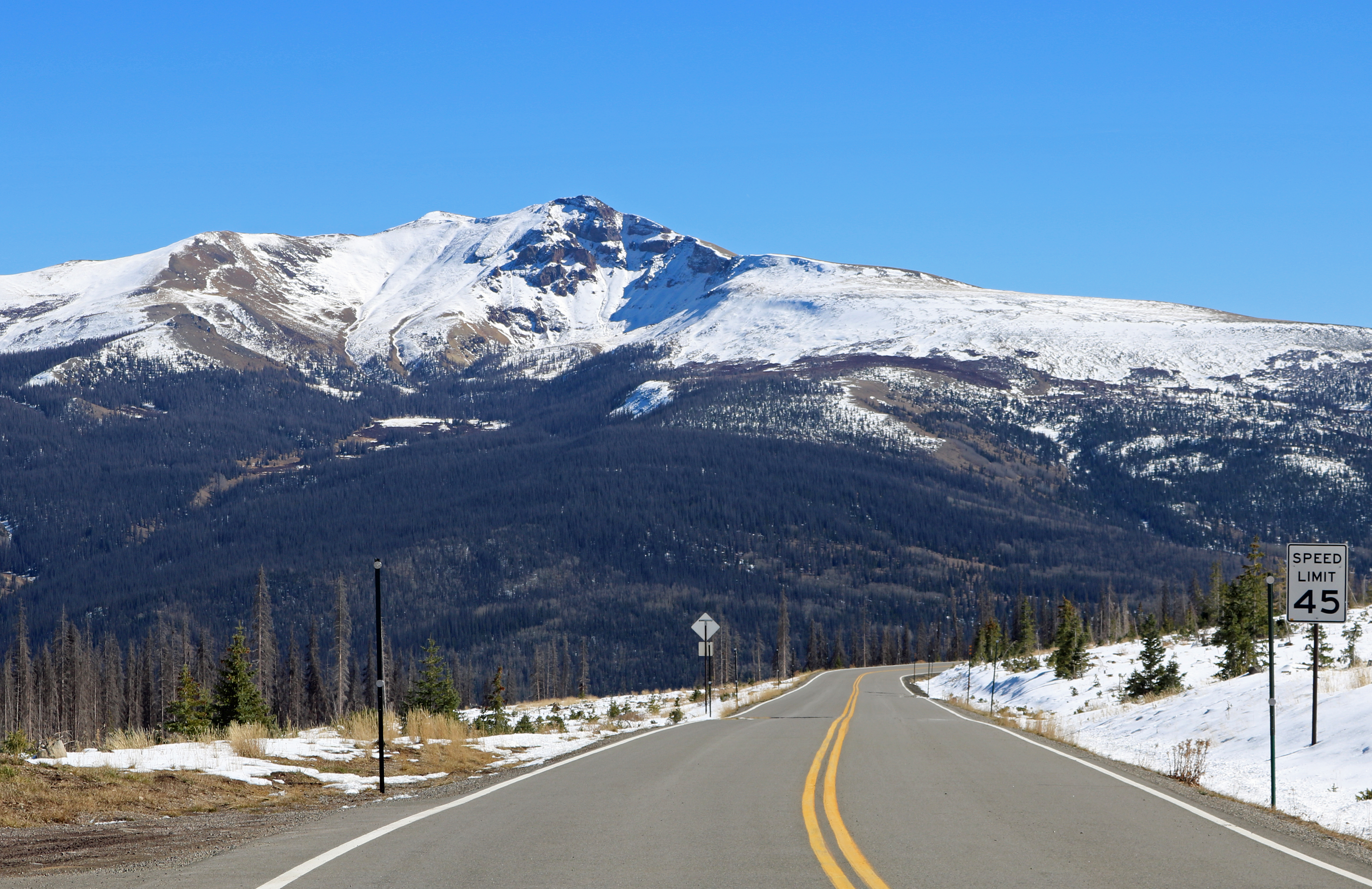
- The mountain in 2018, viewed from State Highway 149

Highest point
- Elevation: 13,379 ft (4,078 m)
- Prominence: 823 ft (251 m)
- Isolation: 1.89 mi (3.04 km)
- Coordinates: 37°57′19″N 107°06′10″W

Geography
- Location within Colorado
- Location: Hinsdale County, Colorado
- Parent range: San Juan Mountains
- Topo map(s): USGS; Baldy Cinco

Baldy Cinco, elevation 13,379 feet (4,078 meters), is a mountain in Hinsdale and Mineral counties in southern Colorado. The mountain, a thirteener, is located on the Continental Divide in the San Juan Mountains. Different areas of the slopes of Baldy Cinco lie in the Rio Grande National Forest, the La Garita Wilderness, and the Gunnison National Forest. The mountain is located just north of Snow Mesa and east northeast of Spring Creek Pass.

== Name ==
The peak is one of a group of five summits in the east-central San Juan Mountains. Originally, the term "baldy cinco" was meant to refer to the five peaks collectively. Over time, however, the name became attached to this one peak.

Several sources refer to one of the other peaks as "Baldy No Es Cinco," indicating that mountain climbers have confused it for the actual Baldy Cinco.

Baldy Cinco is easily seen from Colorado State Highway 149 on the south ascent to Slumgullion Summit, where it appears in profile from across a broad mountain valley. A road sign on the highway there points to the mountain.
