= Irasema Alcántara-Ayala =

Professor of natural hazards and risk

- Born: 1970 (age 55–56)
- Education: National Autonomous University of Mexico; King's College London
- Awards: EGU Sergey Soloviev Medal, ICL Varnes Medal
- Scientific career
- Fields: Disasters; Hazards
- Workplaces: National Autonomous University of Mexico; Massachusetts Institute of Technology
- Thesis: Modelling mass movement risk under semi-arid mountainous conditions : the Alpujarride complex, Spain. (1997)

Irasema Alcántara-Ayala (born 1970) is a professor of Natural hazards and Risk at the National Autonomous University of Mexico. She combines natural science with social sciences, and in particular studies the occurrences of landslides, natural hazards and vulnerability. She was awarded the 2016 European Geosciences Union Sergey Soloviev Medal, and is an International Science Council Fellow.

== Early life and education ==
Alcántara-Ayala was born in Mexico City. She studied geography at National Autonomous University of Mexico and earned her bachelor's degree in 1993. Based on her performance during her undergraduate studies, she was awarded the Gabino Barreda medal. She was a graduate student at King's College London, where she worked on geomorphology and was awarded a PhD in 1997.

== Research and career ==
In 1998 Alcántara-Ayala joined Massachusetts Institute of Technology as a postdoctoral research fellow, where she worked in the Department of Civil and Environmental Engineering. In 2000 Alcántara-Ayala joined National Autonomous University of Mexico as an assistant professor. She was promoted to Professor and the youngest woman to be made Director of the Institute of Geography in 2008. Her work focuses on Latin America and the Caribbean. She works with the Mexico National Centre for Disasters Prevention and the Natural Hazards Centre. Alcántara-Ayala is a member of the Network of Social Studies on the Prevention of Disasters in Latin America. She has assessed the hazard presented by rainfall-induced landslides, using aerial photographs, field observations and slope instability analysis. She combines this field work with social science studies, including social vulnerability analysis. She has emphasised the need for geomorphologists to be involved with the assessment of risk and management of disasters in the developing world. In general, Alcántara-Ayala believes that disasters are socially constructed, that there is a nexus between risk, the environment and development and that risks can be managed at a local level. She collaborates with other colleagues in the Forensic Investigations of Disaster project, which investigates the causes and drivers of risk creation. Alcántara-Ayala has also proposed transforming the National Civil Protection System in Mexico into a more oriented policy of Integrated Disaster Risk Management.

=== Academic service ===
Alcántara-Ayala is former Vice President of the International Association of Geomorphologists. She has previously served as Vice President of the International Geographical Union and of the Integrated Research on Disaster Risk Programme (ISC). She serves on the leadership council of the Mountain Research Initiative (MRI). She is a member of the Organization for Women in Science for the Developing World and of the Mexican Academy of Sciences. Her first book, Geomorphological Hazards and Disaster Prevention, was published by Cambridge University Press in 2010. She is a Young Affiliate of The World Academy of Sciences.

=== Awards and honours ===
Her awards and honours include;

- 2011 The World Academy of Sciences (TWAS) – Regional Office of Latin America and the Caribbean (ROLAC) Prize for Young Scientists
- 2012 Mexican Academy of Sciences Prize for Young Scientists
- 2016 European Geosciences Union Sergey Soloviev Medal
- 2023 International Consortium on Landslides Varnes Medal
