= Retro Stefson =

Icelandic band

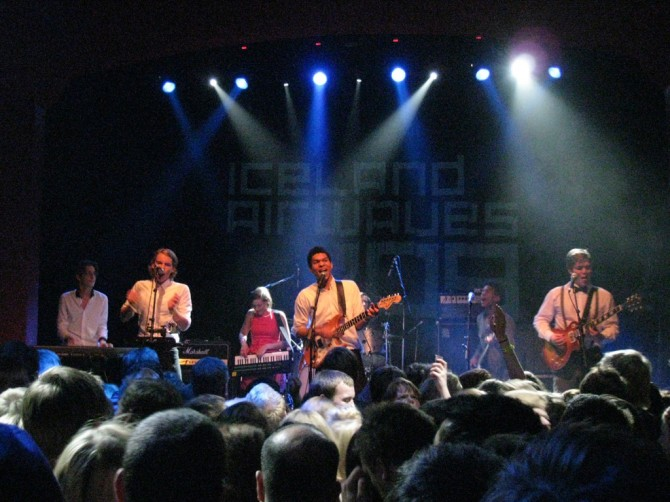
- Retro Stefson live at Iceland Airwaves 2009

Background information
- Origin: Reykjavík, Iceland
- Genres: Alternative; dance music
- Years active: 2006–2016, 2024-2025
- Label: Vertigo-Berlin
- Past members: Unnsteinn Manuel Stefánsson; Þórður Jörundsson; Logi Pedro Stefánsson; Jon Ingvi Seljeseth; Þorbjörg Roach Gunnarsdóttir; Haraldur Ari Stefánsson; Gylfi Freeland Sigurðsson

Retro Stefson was an Icelandic alternative/pop-band formed in Reykjavík, active from 2006 to 2016. The band was signed to Vertigo-Berlin/Universal.

Retro Stefson released their debut album, Montaña, exclusively in Iceland in October 2008 and their second album, Kimbabwe, in October 2010 on Kimi Records. The album also became their European debut in May 2011 on the German subsidiary of Vertigo Records.

The band reunited for a concert in 2024 and an appearance at Iceland Airwaves in 2025.

== Members ==
The band consisted of:

- Unnsteinn Manuel Stefánsson (lead vocals and guitar)
- Þórður Jörundsson (guitar)
- Logi Pedro Stefánsson (bass guitar)
- Jon Ingvi Seljeseth (keyboards)
- Þorbjörg Roach Gunnarsdóttir (synthesizer)
- Haraldur Ari Stefánsson (backing vocals and percussion)
- Gylfi Freeland Sigurðsson (drums)
- Sveinbjörn Thorarensen (synthesizer)

== Discography ==
=== Albums ===
Album and details	Peak positions	Notes
Album and details	ISL	Notes
Montaña: Date released: 2008		Track list: 1. "Wolf, The Boy Who Cried" (3:15); 2. "Salvatore" (4:08); 3. "Papa Paulo III" (2:42); 4. "Paul Is Dead" (4:02); 5. "Elia" (1:14); 6. "Luna" (3:18); 7. "Ísland í dag" (2:53); 8. "Montana" (3:46); 9. "Tælandi" (1:32); 10. "Medallion" (2:29); 11. "Papa Paulo III" (re-edit) (4:00); 12. "Senseni" (11:40); 13. "Life" (3:19)
Kimbabwe: Date released: 2010		Track list: 1. "Intro" (0:41); 2. "Velvakandasveinn" (4:23); 3. "Mama Angola" (4:19); 4. "Lomax" (1:24); 5. "Kimba" (4:44); 6. "Rome, Iowa" (4:11); 7. "Fjallatenór" (3:06); 8. "Eusebio" (4:27); 9. "Lomax II" (1:09); 10. "Low" (2:46); 11. "Karamba" (7:15); 12. "Medallion" (2:28); 13. "Papa Paulo III" (re-edit) (3:59); 14. "Senseni" (9:45)
Retro Stefson: Date released: 2012		Track list: 1. "Solaris" (3:38); 2. "Glow" (3:27); 3. "Qween" (5:11); 4. "Miss Nobody" (3:34); 5. "(o)Kami" (5:11); 6. "Time" (3:40); 7. "She Said" (4:09); 8. "True" (3:51); 9. "Fall" (3:36); 10. "Julia" (3:24)
Scandinavian Pain: Date released: 2016		Track list: 1. "Einn í nótt" (4:07); 2. "Minning" (4:19); 3. "Táraflóðið" (3:40); 4. "Næsta líf" (4:54); Bonus Track: "Skin" (3:39)

=== Singles ===
Year	Single	Peak positions	Album
Year	Single	ISL	Album
2010	"Mama Angola"	–	Kimbabwe
2012	"Qween"	1	Retro Stefson
2012	"Glow"	1	Retro Stefson
2013	"She Said"	1	Retro Stefson
2013	"Julia"	2	Retro Stefson
