= Landslide (disambiguation) =

A landslide is a geological phenomenon.

It may also refer to:

== Arts and entertainment ==
=== Film and television ===
- Landslide (1937 film), a British drama film
- Landslide (1940 film), a Hungarian drama film
- Landslide (1992 film), a film by Jean-Claude Lord
- "Landslide" (Heroes), an episode of the television series Heroes

=== Music ===
- Landslide (album) (1980), by American jazz saxophonist Dexter Gordon
- "Landslide" (Fleetwood Mac song), 1975
- "Landslide" (Olivia Newton-John song), 1982
- "Landslide", a song from the 1983 album Flick of the Switch by AC/DC
- "Landslide", a song from the 2015 album Southernality by the country group A Thousand Horses
- "Landslide", a song from the 2019 album Gallipoli by Beirut

=== Other uses in arts and entertainment ===
- Landslide (board game), the name of two board games about the U.S. presidential elections
- Landslide (novel), a 1967 thriller novel by Desmond Bagley
- Landslide: The Final Days of the Trump Presidency, a 2021 non-fiction book by Michael Wolff
- Landslide (Transformers), a fictional character in Transformers: Cybertron
- Landslide: The Unmaking of the President, 1984–1988, a 1989 book by Jane Mayer and Doyle McManus

== Other uses ==
- Landslide victory, a term used in politics
- Landslides (journal), a scientific journal
- Landslide, wireless network traffic modeling equipment used by Spirent Communications

== See also ==
- Psilocybe caerulescens, also known as the landslide mushroom
