= Colorado State Highway 149 =

State highway in Colorado, United States

State Highway 149
- SH 149 highlighted in red

Route information
- Maintained by CDOT
- Length: 117.522 mi (189.133 km)
- Tourist routes: Silver Thread Scenic and Historic Byway

Major junctions
- South end: US 160 at South Fork
- North end: US 50 west of Gunnison

Location
- Country: United States
- State: Colorado
- Counties: Rio Grande, Mineral, Hinsdale, Gunnison

Highway system
- Colorado State Highway System; Interstate; US; State; Scenic
← SH 145	→ SH 150

State Highway 149 (SH 149) is a 117.522-mile-long (189.133 km) state highway in southwestern Colorado, United States. SH 149's southern terminus is at U.S. Highway 160 (US 160) in South Fork, and the northern terminus is at US 50 west of Gunnison. The entire route is also known as the Silver Thread Scenic and Historic Byway.

== Route description ==
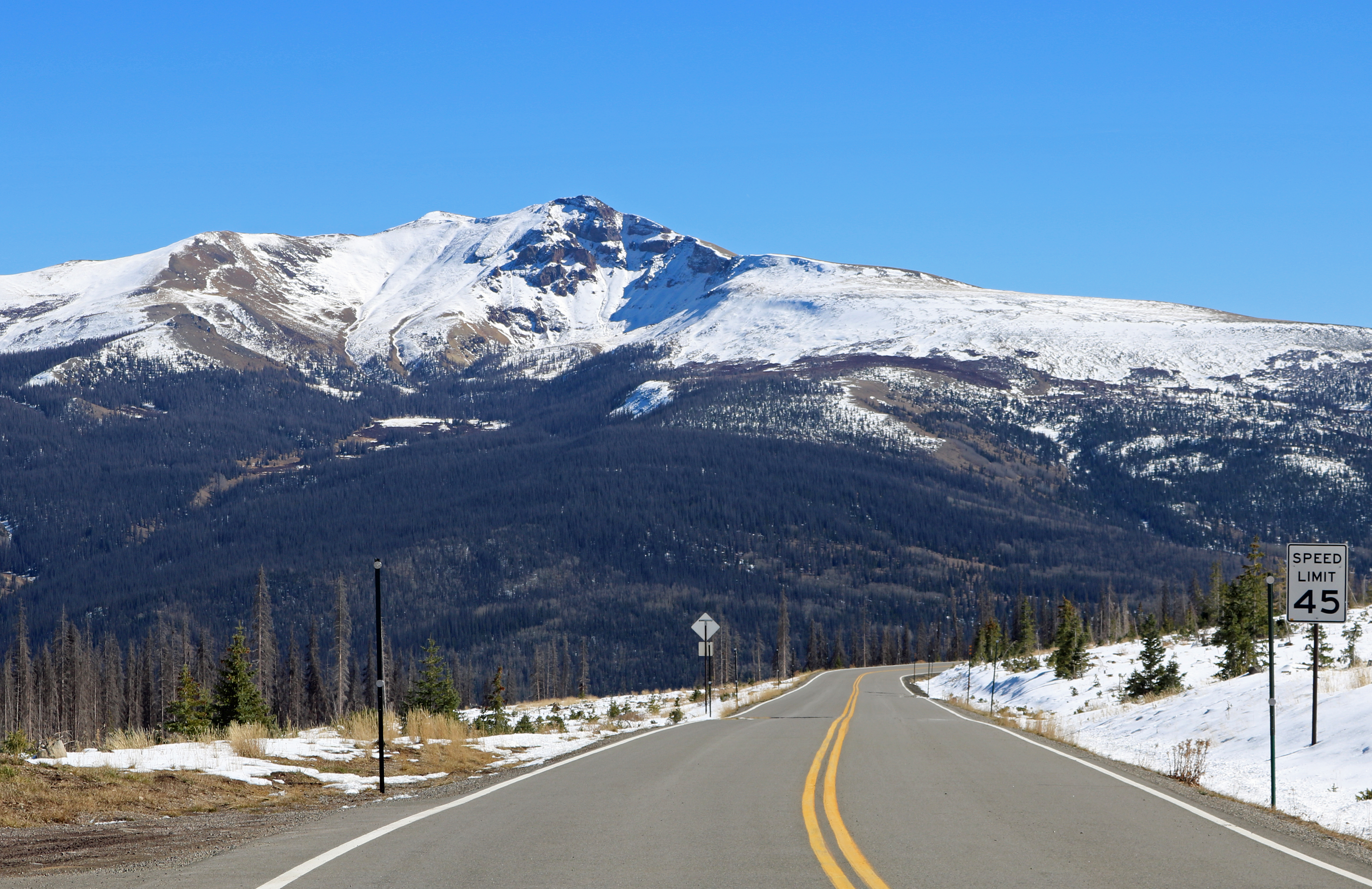
Baldy Cinco viewed from SH 149

SH 149 begins in the south at its junction with US 160 at South Fork. From there the road winds its way generally northward through the San Juan Mountains. The first portion of the road parallels the upper Rio Grande as it passes through Rio Grande National Forest. SH 149 winds through the mountains for 21 miles (34 km) before coming to the historic mining town of Creede. From there the road continues its climb into the mountains and eventually turns away from the Rio Grande to cross the Continental Divide at Spring Creek Pass at an elevation of 10,901 ft (3,323 m). At this point the road passes into Gunnison National Forest and, after a brief descent, begins an even higher climb to Slumgullion Pass elevated 11,361 ft (3,463 m). From there, the highway descends and crosses the Slumgullion Earthflow before it drops to the town of Lake City, where it begins to parallel Lake Fork, a tributary of the Gunnison River. SH 149 follows Lake Fork down out of the mountains and eventually turns away to the east passing just north of Powderhorn where the road again turns northward. After skirting the southern edge of Curecanti National Recreation Area, the highway crosses the Gunnison River and finally reaches its northern terminus at US 50 approximately nine miles west of Gunnison. There are no major junctions along its entire length.

== History ==
The route was established in the 1920s and was completely paved by 1977.

== Major intersections ==
County	Location	mi	km	Destinations	Notes
Rio Grande		0.000	0.000	US 160 – Del Norte, Pagosa Springs	South end of route
Mineral	No major junctions				
Hinsdale	No major junctions				
Gunnison		117.522	189.133	US 50 – Montrose, Gunnison	North end of route
1.000 mi = 1.609 km; 1.000 km = 0.621 mi

== See also ==
- List of scenic byways in Colorado
- Scenic byways in the United States
