= Golconda Mine =

- U.S. National Register of Historic Places
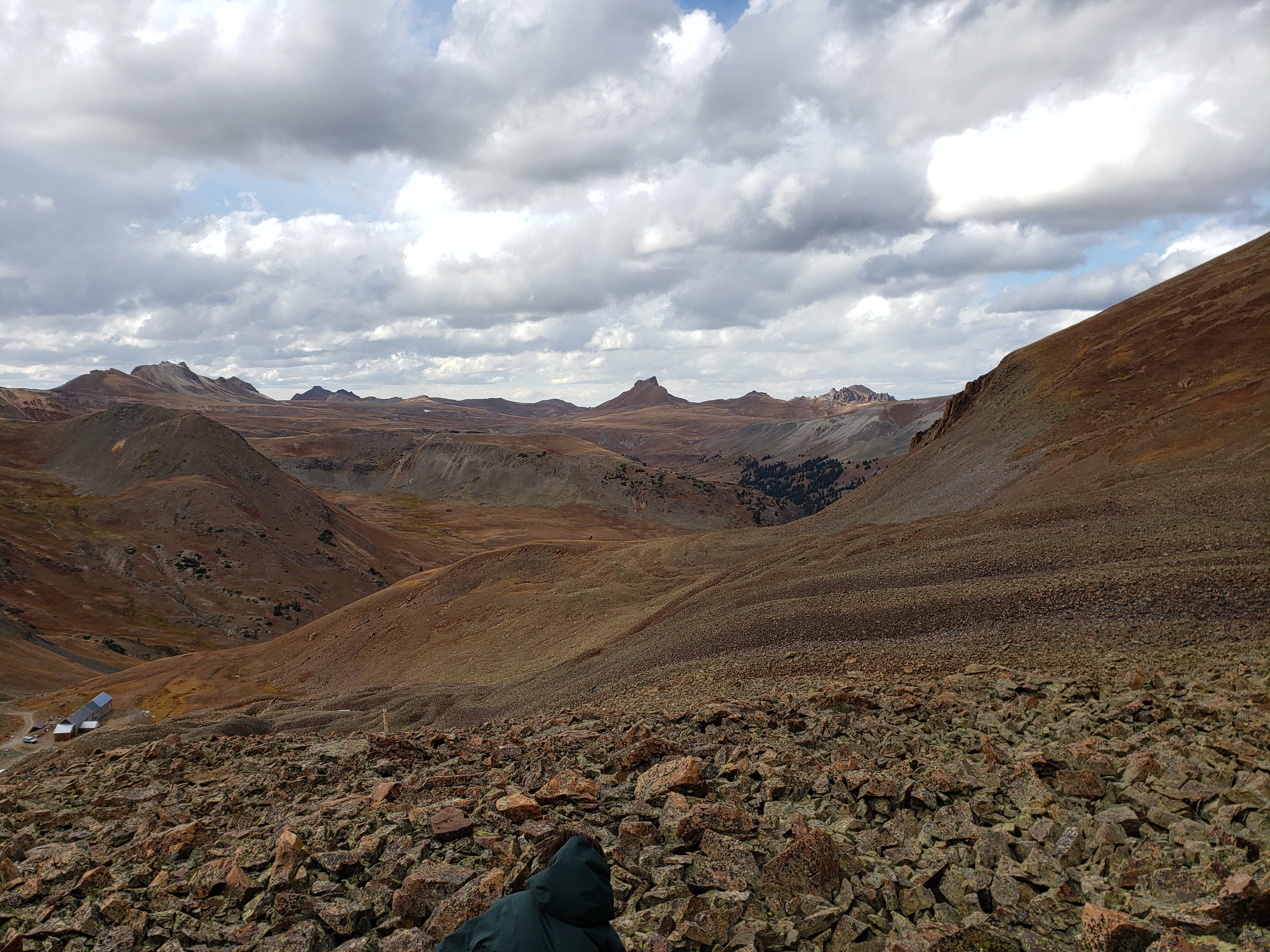
- The surviving building is on the left edge of the photo.
- Nearest city: Lake City, Colorado
- Area: 8 acres (3.2 ha)
- Built: 1920
- MPS: Hinsdale County Metal Mining MPS
- NRHP reference No.: 99001234
- Added to NRHP: September 28, 1999

The Golconda Mine, in the area of Lake City, Colorado, was a historic silver mine.

It was listed on the National Register of Historic Places in 1999. The listed property included one contributing building and one contributing site.

A historic log building survives.
