= Montana (name) =

Montana or Montaña is a surname and given name.

== People with the surname ==
- Allison Montana (1922–2005), New Orleans cultural icon who acted as the Mardi Gras Indian "chief of chiefs"
- Bob Montana (1920–1975), cartoonist who drew the characters that launched Archie Comics
- Claude Montana (1949–2024), French fashion designer
- Cyril Montana (born 1969), French writer
- Faye Montana (born 2003), German actress, video producer and presenter
- Francisco Montana (born 1969), American tennis player
- Freddy Montaña (born 1982), Colombian road cyclist
- Gentil Montaña (1942–2011), classical guitarist and composer
- Íñigo López Montaña (born 1982), Spanish footballer
- Joe Montana (born 1956), American Hall-of-Fame retired National Football League quarterback
- John C. Montana (1893–1964), American mobster and city politician
- Jordi Montaña, Spanish academic
- Jorge López Montaña (born 1978), Spanish retired footballer
- José Fernández Montaña, (1842–1935), Spanish priest, jurist, linguist and historian
- Manny Montana, American actor
- Nate Montana (born 1989), American footballer
- Nick Montana (born 1992), American footballer
- Pietro Montana (1890–1978), Italian-American sculptor, painter and teacher
- Raúl Montaña (born 1971), Colombian road racing cyclist
- Saúl Montana (born 1970), Mexican boxer
- Vincent Montana Jr. (1928–2013), American composer, arranger and percussionist

== People with the given name or nickname ==
- Montana Levi Blanco (born 1984), American costume designer
- Montana Cox (born 1993), Australian model
- Montana De La Rosa (born 1995), American mixed martial artist
- Montana DuRapau (born 1992), American professional baseball pitcher
- Montana Fouts (born 2000), American softball pitcher
- Montana Ham (born 2004), Australian rules footballer
- Montana Jordan (born 2003) American actor
- Montana Kamenga, Congolese recording artist, musician, vocalist and entertainer
- Montana Lemonious-Craig (born 2002), American football player
- Montana Love (born 1995), American professional boxer
- Montana McKinnon (born 2001), Australian rules footballer
- Norodom Montana (1902–1975), Cambodian member of the royal family and cabinet minister
- Montana Slim (1904–1996), Canadian musician
- Montana F. Smith, American legislator
- Montana Taylor (1903–1958), American boogie-woogie and blues pianist
- Montana Tucker (born 1993), American dancer, singer, and social media activist

== People with the stage name or ring name ==
- Alibi Montana, stage name of Nikarson Saint-Germain (born 1978), a French rapper of Haitian origin
- Amber Montana, stage name of American actress Amber Frank (born 1998)
- Billy Montana, American country music singer-songwriter William Schlappi (born 1959)
- Duke Montana, Italian underground rapper, actor and businessman Duccio Barker (born 1975)
- French Montana, stage name of American rapper Karim Kharbouch (born 1984)
- Joey Montana, Panamanian reggaeton singer Edgardo Antonio Miranda Beiro (born 1982)
- Lenny Montana, American professional wrestler, mobster, and actor (debuting in The Godfather) born Leonardo Passafaro (1926–1992)
- Marcus Montana, stage name of Australian pop singer and one-hit wonder Marcus Lagudi
- Montie Montana, rodeo trick rider, actor, stuntman and cowboy born Owen Harlen Mickel (1910–1998)
- Patsy Montana, American country music singer-songwriter Ruby Rose Blevins (1908–1996)
- Randy Montana, American country singer Randy Schlappi (born 1985), son of William Schlappi, aka "Billy Montana"
- Small Montana, ring name of Filipino boxer Benjamin Gan (1913–1976)
- Montana Slim, stage name of Wilf Carter (1904–1996), Canadian country music singer, songwriter, guitarist and yodeler

== Fictional characters ==
- Montana (character), a Marvel Comics villain character, first appearing in 1964
- Hannah Montana (character), the title character of the television series Hannah Montana
- Léon Montana, the main character in the 1994 film Léon: The Professional
- Tony Montana, played by Al Pacino in the 1983 film Scarface
- Lindsay Monroe or Montana, in CSI: NY
- Montana Jones, the title character of Montana Jones, an Italian-Japanese anime series broadcast from 1994 to 1995
- Montana Max, in Tiny Toon Adventures
