= Spring Creek Pass =

Mountain pass in Colorado, USA

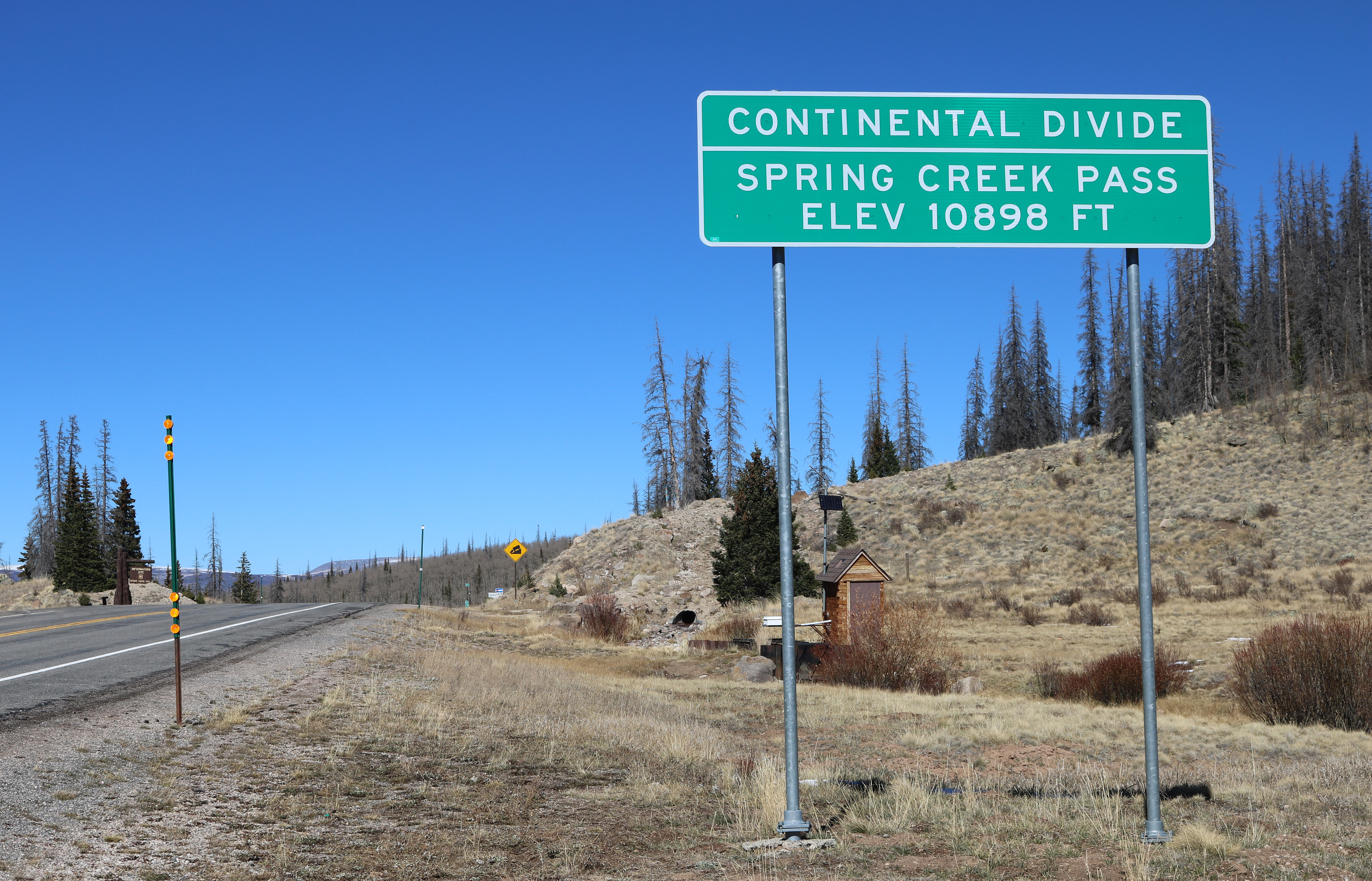
- Looking north across the pass.

- Location within Colorado
- Elevation: 10,898 feet (3,322 m)
- Traversed by: SH 149

Third Approach
- Location: Hinsdale County, Colorado, U.S.
- Range: San Juan Mountains
- Coordinates: 37.9408°N 107.1592°W
- Topo map: USGS Slumgullion Pass

Spring Creek Pass, elevation 10,898 ft (3,322 m), is a mountain pass on the Continental Divide in the San Juan Mountains of Colorado. The pass is traversed by State Highway 149, and the Continental Divide Trail and Colorado Trail follow the divide and cross the highway here. Somewhat unusually for a pass on the Continental Divide, it is not the highest point on the highway in the vicinity; heading north from the pass, the road climbs over the considerably higher Slumgullion Summit before descending toward Lake City.

== Water Diversion ==
Around 1910, the Tabor Ditch was constructed to divert water from tributaries of Cebolla Creek in the Gunnison River basin over the continental divide at Spring Creek Pass into Big Spring Creek in the Rio Grande basin. This 0.5 miles (0.80 km) ditch was originally constructed to divert water for irrigation, but it is now owned by the Colorado Parks and Wildlife. The ditch can carry approximately 30 cubic feet per second (0.85 m^{3}/s), and in an average year, it diverts about 1,400 acre⋅ft (1.7 million m^{3}).

== See also ==
- List of mountain passes in Colorado
