= Lake City Community School =

Community school

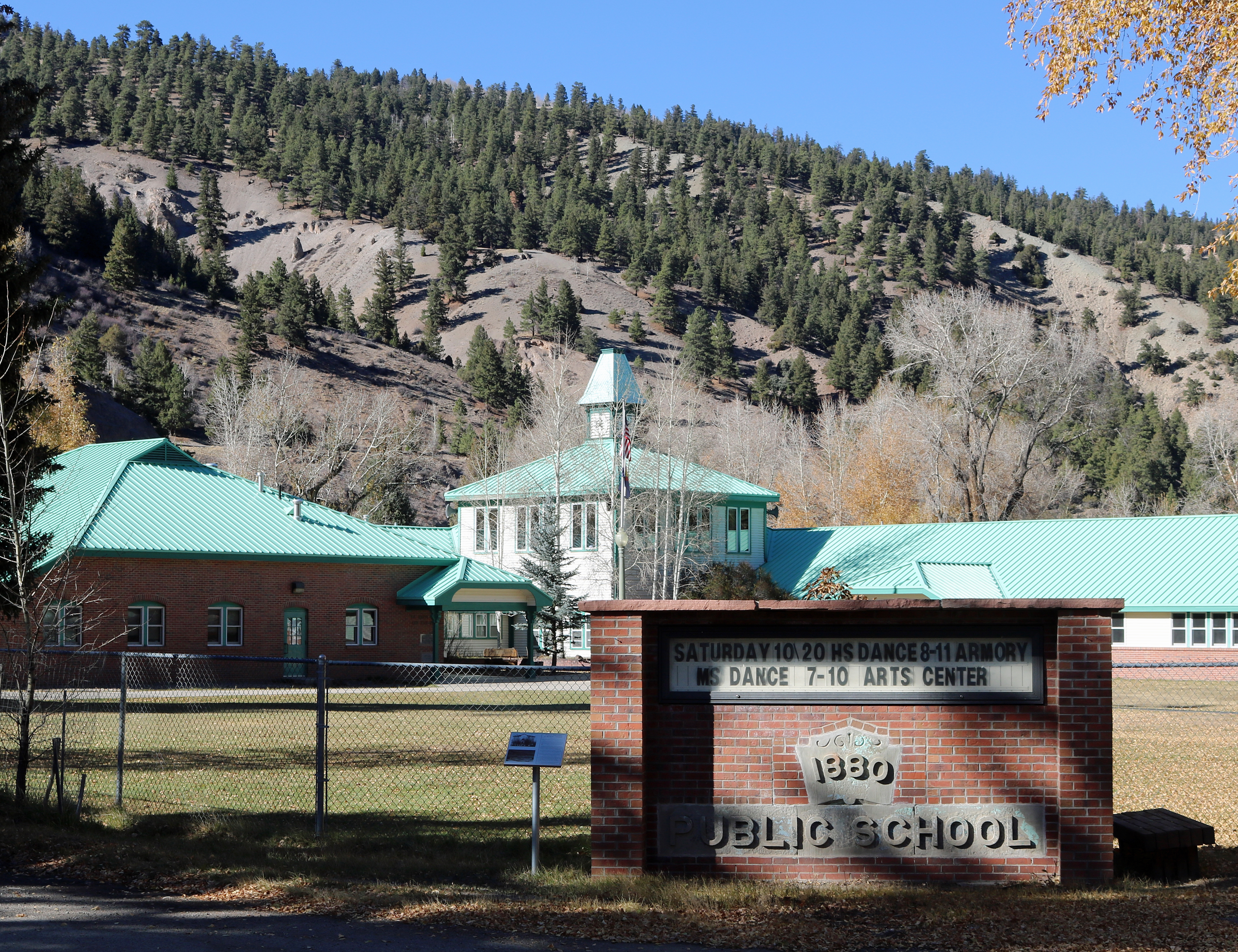
- The school in 2018.

Location
- 614 N. Silver Street; Lake City, Colorado 81235; United States
- Coordinates: 38°01′59″N 107°18′52″W

Information
- School district: Hinsdale County School District
- CEEB code: 060894
- Teaching staff: 11.95 (FTE)
- Grades: Pre-K to 12th grade
- Enrollment: 76 (2023–2024)
- Student to teacher ratio: 6.36
- Website: www.lakecityschool.org

Lake City Community School is a school in Lake City, Hinsdale County, Colorado, United States. It provides Pre-K to 12th grade education for approximately 100 students. It is the only school in Hinsdale School District RE-1.

This school hosts soccer games against Gunnison and Crested Butte. U-12 and U13 soccer teams consist only of Pre-K through 7th grade.

The school hosts ACT and CSAP tests. It also offers Advanced Placement Program classes.
