= Little Rome =

Little Rome may refer to:

- Asmara, Eritrea
- Canosa di Puglia, Italy
- Lipa, Batangas, Philippines
- Blaj, Romania
- Trnava, Slovakia
- Negombo, Sri Lanka
- Birmingham Oratory, in Birmingham, England
- Brookland, a neighborhood of Washington, D.C., United States
- Little Rome (Lake City, Colorado), a 19th-century mining camp on the National Register of Historic Places listings in Hinsdale County, Colorado

== See also ==
- Rome
