= Slumgullion Pass =

Mountain pass in Colorado, USA

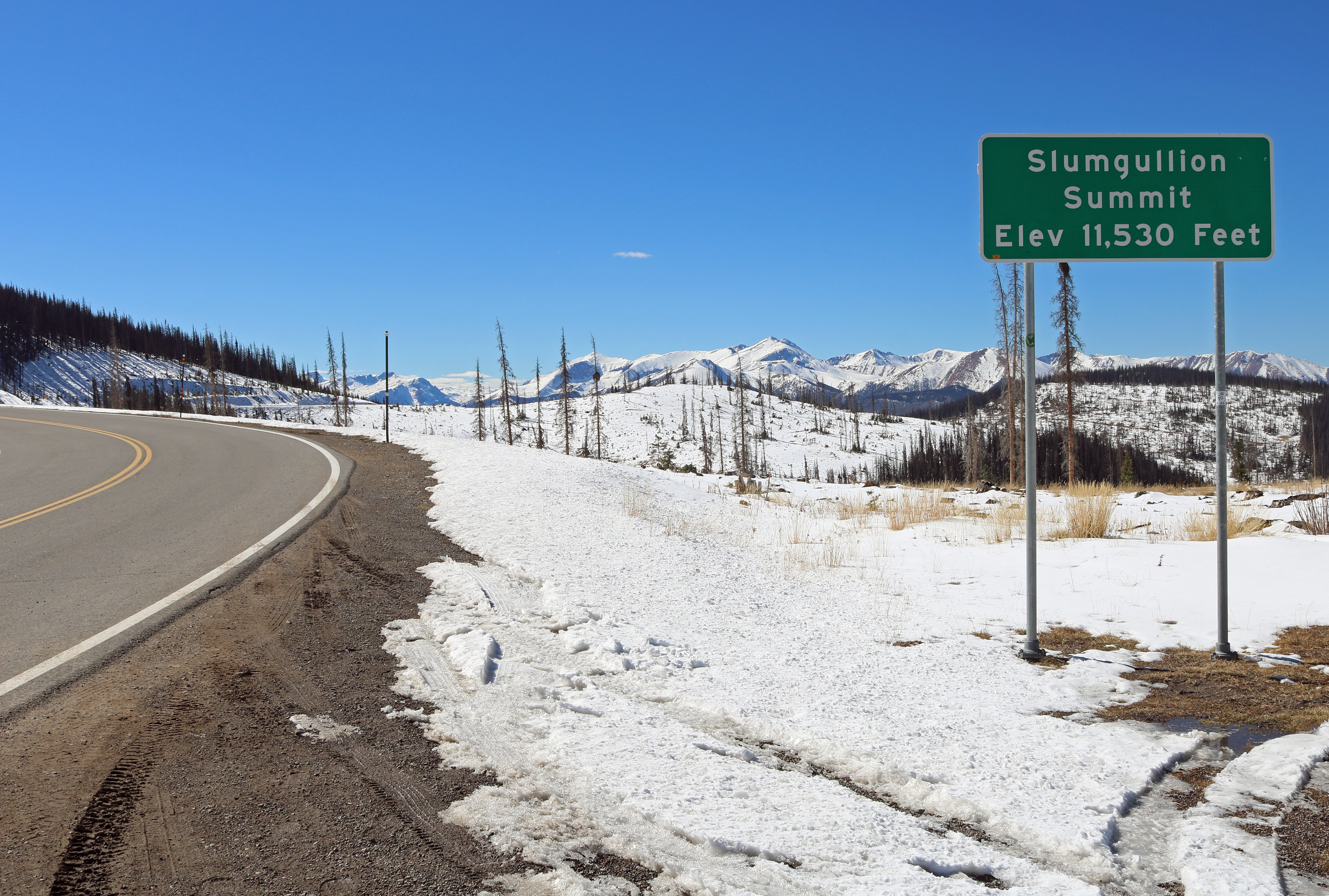
- The summit of Slumgullion Pass, looking west.

- Location within Colorado
- Elevation: 11,530 feet (3,510 m)
- Traversed by: SH 149

Third Approach
- Location: Hinsdale County, Colorado
- Range: San Juan Mountains
- Coordinates: 37°59′08″N 107°13′20″W
- Topo map: USGS Slumgullion Pass

Slumgullion Pass (elevation 11,530 ft (3,514 m)) is a mountain pass in southwestern Colorado traversed by State Highway 149 east of Lake City. The north side has the steepest grade of any continuously paved road in Colorado (9%), but the pass does not close often in winter because snowplows clear the route regularly during this season. It has a few switchbacks and tight spots, but other than that, most travelers will find it an easy, scenic route.

Technically speaking, the current highway does not traverse the true Slumgullion Pass, which lies just off the highway on the ridge between Cebolla Creek and the Lake Fork of the Gunnison River, at an elevation of about 11,300 ft (3,400 m). As a result of a realignment several decades ago (evident by comparing USGS topographic maps of different vintages), the road now takes a shorter but somewhat higher route as it travels east and south from this spot toward Spring Creek Pass. The road sign at the high point refers to Slumgullion Summit rather than Slumgullion Pass in order to reflect this. This is analogous to the usage of the terms Donner Summit and Cajon Summit in California. However, in all three cases, the more familiar but slightly inaccurate name is routinely used.

== Slumgullion Slide ==
Slumgullion Pass is named for the nearby Slumgullion Earthflow, a gigantic landslide whose yellowish soil reminded early settlers and miners of slumgullion stew.

The Slumgullion Slide began about 700 years ago when weak volcanic tuff and breccia on the southern flank of Mesa Seco slumped several miles down the steep mountainside. Approximately 300 years ago, a second earthflow started from the top of the mountain and is still active, moving as much as twenty feet (six meters) per year. Trees growing on the newer slide are tipped at odd angles.

The first flow was so large and cataclysmic that it blocked the Lake Fork of the Gunnison River and created Lake San Cristobal, Colorado's second largest natural lake.

== Climate ==
Climate data for Slumgullion Pass, Colorado, 1991–2020 normals, 1983-2020 extremes: 11440ft (3487m)
Month	Jan	Feb	Mar	Apr	May	Jun	Jul	Aug	Sep	Oct	Nov	Dec	Year
Record high °F (°C)	50 (10)	53 (12)	62 (17)	62 (17)	74 (23)	77 (25)	80 (27)	79 (26)	72 (22)	66 (19)	59 (15)	48 (9)	80 (27)
Mean maximum °F (°C)	41 (5)	42 (6)	49 (9)	53 (12)	60 (16)	71 (22)	71 (22)	69 (21)	65 (18)	58 (14)	48 (9)	40 (4)	73 (23)
Mean daily maximum °F (°C)	27.0 (−2.8)	28.9 (−1.7)	36.2 (2.3)	41.1 (5.1)	49.3 (9.6)	62.1 (16.7)	63.9 (17.7)	61.2 (16.2)	55.8 (13.2)	45.0 (7.2)	34.1 (1.2)	26.2 (−3.2)	44.2 (6.8)
Daily mean °F (°C)	18.3 (−7.6)	19.1 (−7.2)	25.4 (−3.7)	30.8 (−0.7)	39.5 (4.2)	49.7 (9.8)	54.2 (12.3)	52.0 (11.1)	46.3 (7.9)	36.1 (2.3)	25.7 (−3.5)	18.0 (−7.8)	34.6 (1.4)
Mean daily minimum °F (°C)	8.5 (−13.1)	7.9 (−13.4)	13.1 (−10.5)	18.8 (−7.3)	27.9 (−2.3)	37.3 (2.9)	42.3 (5.7)	41.1 (5.1)	35.0 (1.7)	25.2 (−3.8)	15.5 (−9.2)	8.5 (−13.1)	23.4 (−4.8)
Mean minimum °F (°C)	−7 (−22)	−8 (−22)	−4 (−20)	5 (−15)	15 (−9)	26 (−3)	36 (2)	35 (2)	23 (−5)	9 (−13)	−3 (−19)	−9 (−23)	−13 (−25)
Record low °F (°C)	−22 (−30)	−28 (−33)	−16 (−27)	−7 (−22)	3 (−16)	11 (−12)	26 (−3)	25 (−4)	4 (−16)	−10 (−23)	−15 (−26)	−27 (−33)	−28 (−33)
Average precipitation inches (mm)	1.96 (50)	2.12 (54)	2.42 (61)	2.84 (72)	1.67 (42)	0.64 (16)	2.25 (57)	2.28 (58)	1.83 (46)	2.21 (56)	2.15 (55)	2.06 (52)	24.43 (619)
Source 1: XMACIS2
Source 2: NOAA (Precipitation)

== See also ==
- Colorado mountain passes
