= David J. Varnes =

American geologist (1919-2002)

David Joseph Varnes (April 5, 1919 – February 3, 2002) was a U.S. geologist chiefly known for his work on landslide classification.

He graduated from the California Institute of Technology in 1940 and joined the United States Geological Survey the following year. He became part of its Engineering Geology Branch in 1948 and worked on ground conditions for the new United States Air Force Academy in Colorado. His subsequent paper, with Glen Scott, won the Geological Society of America's Burwell Award in 1970.

Varnes began a study of landslide classification that lasted 4 decades. His paper in the Highway Research Board book on Landslides and Engineering Practice (1958) together with its revisions 1978 and, with David Cruden, 1996 established a worldwide standard for such classification.

He also worked on earthquake prediction, co-authoring a paper on seismic activity in the Virgin Islands with Charles Bufe. His "earthquake prediction work has attracted worldwide attention and debate, and may well be his most enduring contribution."

The Varnes Medal of the International Consortium on Landslides is named in his honor.
