= Earthflow =

Type of mass movement

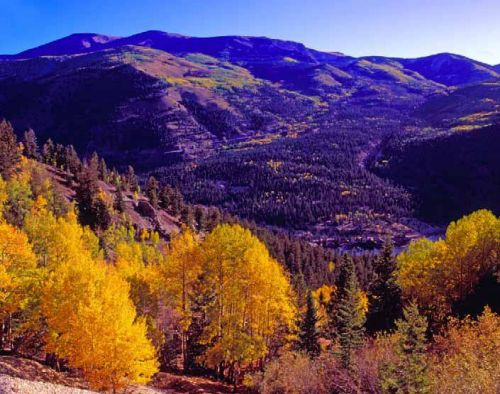
Image of Slumgullion Earthflow

An earthflow (earth flow) is a downslope viscous flow of fine-grained materials that have been saturated with water and moves under the pull of gravity. It is an intermediate type of mass wasting that is between downhill creep and mudflow. The types of materials that are susceptible to earthflows are clay, fine sand and silt, and fine-grained pyroclastic material.

When the ground materials become saturated with enough water, they will start flowing (soil liquefaction). Its speed can range from being barely noticeable to rapid movement. The velocity of the flow is dictated by water content: the higher the water content is, the higher the velocity will be. Because of the dependency on water content for the velocity of the flow, it can take minutes or years for the materials to move down the slope.

== Features and behavior ==
Earthflows are just one type of mass movement that can occur on a hill slope. It has been recognized as its own type of movement since the early 20th century. Earthflows are one of the most fluid types of mass movements. Earthflows occur on heavily saturated slopes like mudflows or a debris flow. Though earthflows are a lot like mudflows, overall they are slower and are covered with solid material carried along by flow from within. Earthflows are often made up of fine-grained materials so slopes consisting of clay and silt materials are more likely to create an earthflow.

As earthflows are usually water-dependent, the risk of one occurring is much higher in humid areas especially after a period of heavy rainfall or snowmelt. The high level of precipitation, which saturates the ground and adds water to the slope content, increases the pore-water pressure and reduces the shearing strength of the material. As the slope becomes wet, the earthflow may start as a creep downslope due to the clay or silt having less friction. As the material is increasingly more saturated, the slope will fail, which depends on slope stability. In earthflows, the slope does not fail along a clear shear plane and is instead more fluid as the material begins to move under the force of gravity as friction and slope stability is reduced.

== Velocity ==
Earthflows vary in velocity of flow depending partly on the consistency of the flow for the speed of the entire movement, usually meaning how much water is in the material of the hill slope before the slope fails. Though water is often the key factor in slope failure, triggering an earthflow, there can also be dry granular flows made up of granular material. The speed also depends on the angle of slope as earthflows can happen on moderate or steep slopes. Because earthflows are usually water-dependent, they can take many years or just minutes to move a significant amount. An earthflow may affect as few as several square meters or up to several hectares in either time frame.

== Effects ==
Earthflows can have sudden impacts on the amount of sediment that is deposited into a river system, which can have effects on the life in and around the river itself. They can also cause damage to roads and constructions built near the slope. One of the best mitigation techniques to avoid serious earthflow and landslide damage is properly draining the slope of water, especially in places of high levels of precipitation.

== Areas of risk ==
The areas most at risk for earthflows are:

- Slopes that have been undercut or loaded with more sediment for human construction
- Slopes that have been undercut by rivers or stream beds
- Areas that receive heavy rainfall or snowmelt
- Hill slopes made up of clay, silt, or other fine-grained materials
- Areas with limited vegetation on hill slopes
- Areas with evidence of past earthflows

== See also ==
- Landslide mitigation
