= Montana F. Smith =

American politician

Montana F. Smith (born c.1916) was an American state legislator in Colorado. A Democrat, she served in the Colorado House of Representatives in 1947 and 1949. She was from Lake City, Colorado and represented Denver County.

Smith studied agricultural engineering at Colorado University.
