= Slumgullion Earthflow =

Geographic feature in Colorado, USA

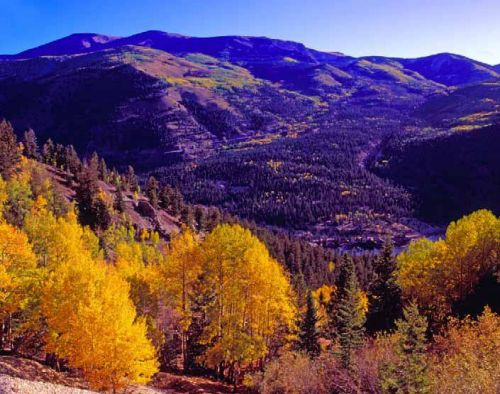
- Interactive map of Slumgullion Earthflow
- Location: Hinsdale County, Colorado, United States
- Nearest city: Lake City, Colorado
- Coordinates: 37°59′30″N 107°15′25″W

U.S. National Natural Landmark
- Designated: 1983

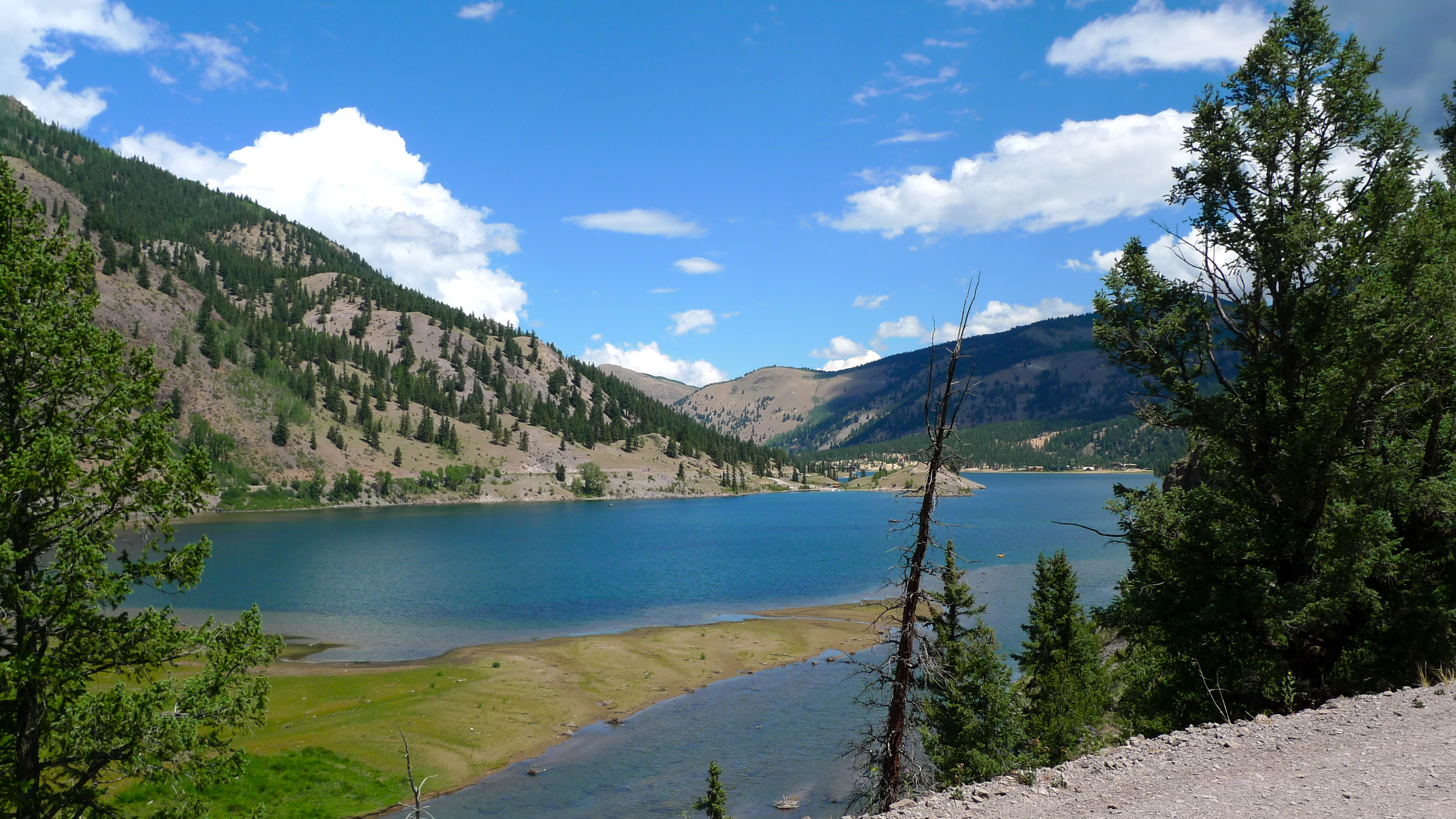
Lake San Cristobal was created 700 years ago when the Slumgullion Earthflow created a natural dam.

The Slumgullion Earthflow is a remnant of a landslide in the San Juan Mountains in Hinsdale County, Colorado. It was designated a National Natural Landmark in 1983. It is also a Colorado Natural Area and an Area of Critical Environmental Concern.

The earthflow, a slow-moving landslide, crawled down the valley about 700 years ago creating the 4-mile-long (6.4 km) and 2,000-foot-wide (610 m) wide mass. The earthflow lies a few miles southeast of Lake City. The landmark site covers 1,291 acres (522 ha) and is owned and managed by the US Forest Service and the Bureau of Land Management. It is "a striking example of mass wasting (the movement of large masses of earth material)." The Lake Fork of the Gunnison River was dammed by the earthflow, creating Lake San Cristobal. A second earthflow has been moving continuously for about 300 years over older, stable rock. It moves at a rate of about 7 meters (23 ft) per year.

The area is a habitat for elk and deer. It is crossed by Colorado Highway 149, the principal highway of the area connecting Lake City with Creede.
