= Landslides (journal) =

- Discipline: Earth sciences, engineering
- Language: English
- Edited by: K. Sassa

Publication details
- History: 2004-present
- Publisher: Springer Science+Business Media
- Frequency: Monthly
- Open access: Hybrid
- Impact factor: 6.7 (2022)

Standard abbreviations
- ISO 4: Landslides

Indexing
- ISSN: 1612-510X (print); 1612-5118 (web)
- LCCN: 2007204176
- OCLC no.: 456171837

Links
- Journal homepage; Online archive

Landslides is a monthly peer-reviewed scientific journal covering research on all aspects of landslides. The topics covered by the journal range from landslide identification and monitoring, remote sensing, laboratory and field testing, to risk assessment and mitigation. It was established in 2004 as the official journal of the International Consortium on Landslides and is published by Springer Science+Business Media. The editor-in-chief is Kyoji Sassa (Kyoto University).

== Abstracting and indexing ==
Landslides is abstracted and indexed in:

- CAB International
- AGRICOLA
- Current Contents/Engineering, Computing & Technology
- Current Contents/Physical, Chemical & Earth Sciences
- EBSCO databases
- Ei Compendex
- GEOBASE
- GeoRef
- InfoTrac databases
- Inspec
- ProQuest databases
- Referativny Zhurnal
- Science Citation Index Expanded
- Scopus

According to the 2018 Journal Citation Reports, the journal has a 2017 impact factor of 3.811.
