= Mudflow =

Form of mass wasting

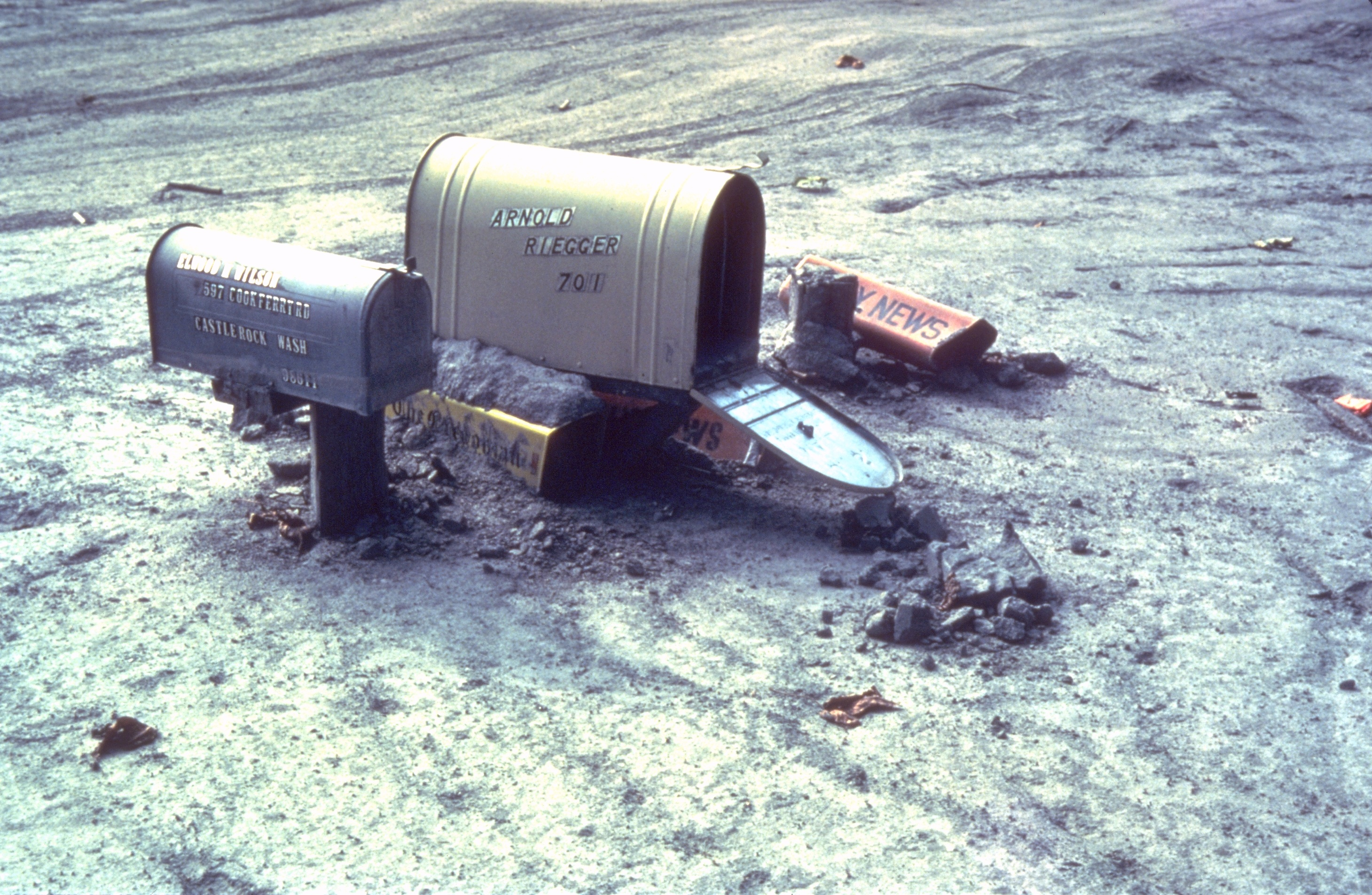
Mailboxes caught in a mudflow following the May 1980 Mount St. Helens volcanic eruption.

A mudflow, also known as mudslide or mud flow, is a form of mass wasting involving fast-moving flow of debris and dirt that has become liquified by the addition of water. Such flows can move at speeds ranging from three to five metres per second (9.8 to 16.4 ft/s). Mudflows contain a significant proportion of clay, which makes them more fluid than debris flows, allowing them to travel farther and across lower slope angles. Both types of flow are generally mixtures of particles with a wide range of sizes, which typically become sorted by size upon deposition.

Mudflows are often called mudslips, a term applied indiscriminately by the mass media to a variety of mass wasting events. Mudflows often start as slides, becoming flows as water is entrained along the flow path; such events are often called mud failures.

Other types of mudflows include lahars (involving fine-grained pyroclastic deposits on the flanks of volcanoes) and jökulhlaups (outbursts from under glaciers or icecaps).

== Triggering of mudflows ==
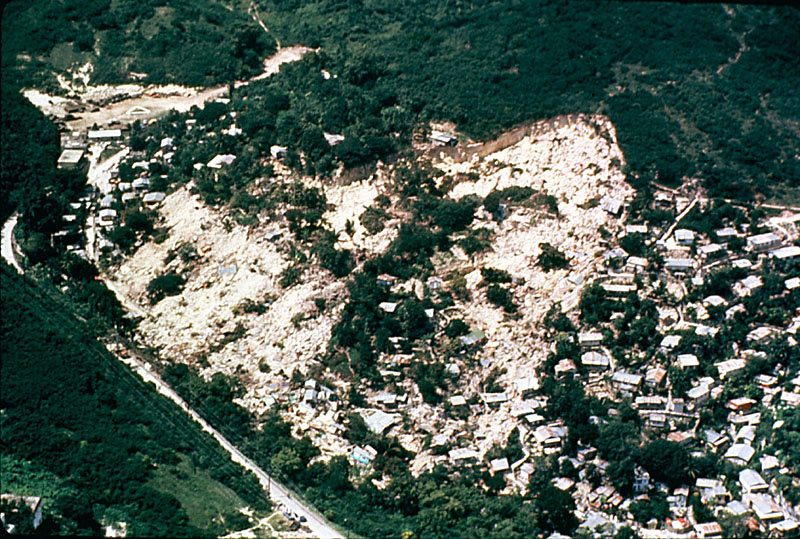
The Mameyes mudflow disaster, in barrio Tibes, Ponce, Puerto Rico, was caused by heavy rainfall from Tropical Storm Isabel in 1985. The mudflow destroyed more than 100 homes and claimed an estimated 300 lives.

Heavy rainfall, snowmelt, or high levels of groundwater flowing through cracked bedrock may trigger a movement of soil or sediments in landslides that continue as mudflows. Floods and debris flows may also occur when strong rains on hill or mountain slopes cause extensive erosion and/or mobilize loose sediment that is located in steep mountain channels. The 2006 Sidoarjo mud flow may have been caused by rogue drilling.

The point where a muddy material begins to flow depends on its grain size, the water content, and the slope of the topography. Fine grained material like mud or sand can be mobilized by shallower flows than a coarse sediment or a debris flow. Higher water content (higher precipitation/overland flow) also increases the potential to initiate a mudflow.

After a mudflow forms, coarser sediment may be picked up by the flow. Coarser sediment picked up by the flow often forms the front of a mudflow surge and is pushed by finer sediment and water that pools up behind the coarse-grained moving mudflow-front. Mudflows may contain multiple surges of material as the flow scours channels and destabilizes adjacent hillslopes (potentially nucleating new mudflows). Mudflows have mobilized boulders 1–10 metres (3 ft 3 in – 32 ft 10 in) across in mountain settings.

Some broad mudflows are rather viscous and therefore slow; others begin very quickly and continue like an avalanche. They are composed of at least 50% silt and clay-sized materials and up to 30% water. Because mudflows mobilize a significant amount of sediment, mudflows have higher flow heights than a clear water flood for the same water discharge. Also, sediment within the mudflow increases granular friction within the flow structure of the flow relative to clear water floods, which raises the flow depth for the same water discharge.

== Mudflows and landslides ==
Landslide is a more general term than mudflow. It refers to the gravity-driven failure and more subsequent movement downslope of any types of surface movement of soil, rock, or other debris. The term incorporates earth slides, rock falls, flows, and mudslides, amongst other categories of hillslope mass movements.

== Largest recorded mudflow ==
The world's largest historic subaerial (on land) landslide occurred during the 1980 eruption of Mount St. Helens, a volcano in the Cascade Mountain Range in the US state of Washington. The volume of material displaced was 2.8 cubic kilometres (0.67 cu mi).

The largest known of all prehistoric landslides was an enormous submarine landslide that disintegrated 60,000 years ago and produced the longest flow of sand and mud yet documented on Earth. The massive submarine flow travelled 1,500 kilometres (930 mi) – the distance from London to Rome.

By volume, the largest submarine landslide (the Agulhas slide off South Africa) occurred approximately 2.6 million years ago. The volume of the slide was 20,000 cubic kilometres (4,800 cu mi).

== See also ==
- Quick clay – Type of glaciomarine and unstable clay prone to landslides
- Osceola Mudflow – Volcanic mudflow in Washington, USA
