= Marcus Montana =

Stage name of Australian pop singer

Marcus Montana was the stage name of Marcus Lagudi, an Australian pop performer from the late 1980s. He was known for his debut single, "Tell Him I'm Your Man" (mid-1989), which was not a commercial hit. However, it has been long remembered in the Sydney area and was extensively covered in the local papers during and long after his debut. His brief music career was the subject of a retrospective by Jack Marx in 2005 for The Sydney Morning Herald. Lagudi is the middle of three sons of Italian-Australian greengrocers; all three had attended a private eastern suburbs school, Waverley College.

== Poster campaign ==
Montana is largely remembered as an early example of viral marketing, the launch of his brief career in mid-1989 was preceded by a poster campaign in Sydney, which covered thousands of walls, billboards, and telephone poles with posters that declared: "Marcus is Coming". As intended the campaign generated discussion on radio, and expectations in the media and community. While the campaign itself was successful in making Montana's debut a talking point, his subsequent music career was a failure. His manager, Paul Lagudi, is also his brother.

== Debut single ==
Montana had recorded his debut single, "Tell Him I'm Your Man", in secret at Music Mill Studios in Nashville, Tennessee. It was co-written by Lagudi with Janice Slater. The B-side is "End of the Line". The single peaked at number 146 on the Australian ARIA singles chart in October 1989. During his brief pop career Montana worked with Michael Vidale, the bass guitar player with Jimmy and the Boys, Louis Burdett on drums and guitarist Tim Freedman, who was later the founding mainstay member of the Whitlams. Montana had a repertoire of nine songs, one was a ballad, which was performed "very slow" with him "singing it two beats out of time... It was a horrible cacophony, and it was unstoppable."

== Criticism ==
"Tell Him I'm Your Man" appearance was heralded by a second poster campaign, which advertised "Marcus is Here!" and provoked a barrage of criticism from music reviewers. According to James Cockington of The Sydney Morning Herald (October 1989), when JJJ broadcast the single, "within 34 seconds all eight incoming lines were jammed, all wanting to stop the record, at once." Andrew Mueller of rock newspaper, On the Street described the song as a "sack of shit." Freedman later reflected, "[his] family were trying to make young Marcus Montana a rock'n'roll star, without the conventional backing of the corporate industry." Largely because of the poster campaign and his apparent inexperience, Montana quickly became a figure of ridicule. Roy Williams of The Australian reviewed Jack Marx' book, Australian Tragic: Gripping Tales from the Dark Side of Our History (2009), which dealt with various stories from Australia's history. Many are horrific, however "Some stories are more quirky than horrific. One concern a reported alien abduction that took place near Grafton in 1996, another the 'rise and fall of Marcus Montana, a true rock legend' in the Sydney music scene of 1989."

== Appearances ==
Montana played a series of gigs in Sydney – an outdoor concert at Darling Harbour and a series of performances in Westfield and Roselands shopping centres – but they were noteworthy more for the audience heckling the singer than anything else. Freedman wore a wig, in an attempt to disguise himself, when backing Montana. Another gig was at the popular pub-rock venue, Selinas, in Coogee. Freedman contacted his friend, Steve Pavlovic to book Marcus for his last show, at The Lansdowne Hotel, Broadway on 29 December 1989.

== Recommended reading ==
- Marx, Jack (2009), Australian Tragic: Gripping Tales from the Dark Side of Our History, Hachette Australia, ISBN 978-0-7336-2608-1
