= International Consortium on Landslides =

Non-governmental research organization

- ICL logo
- Formation: January 2002; 24 years ago
- Type: NGO
- Purpose: Landslide research and education
- Headquarters: Kyoto, Japan
- Official language: English, Japanese
- Website: www.landslides.org

The International Consortium on Landslides is a non-governmental organization created in 2002 to promote landslide research, education, and risk evaluation and reduction. It is located in Kyoto, Japan. The organization has consultative status with UNESCO.

The ICL's journal is Landslides. It holds regular symposiums, including the World Landslide Forum, which is held every three years by its "International Programme on Landslides". It has various committees and programs, and was a co-founder of the "2006 Tokyo Action Plan", to carry out global cooperation on landslide monitoring and early warning; hazard mapping, vulnerability, and risk assessment; study of catastrophic landslides and landslides that threaten culturally important sites; and preparedness, mitigation, and recovery after landslides.

As of 2012, the organization had 52 member organizations, such as the United States Geological Survey, the China Geological Survey, the National Institute of Disaster Management in India, and the Disaster Prevention Research Institute at Kyoto University.
