= Lake City, Colorado =

Town in Colorado, United States

- Statutory Town
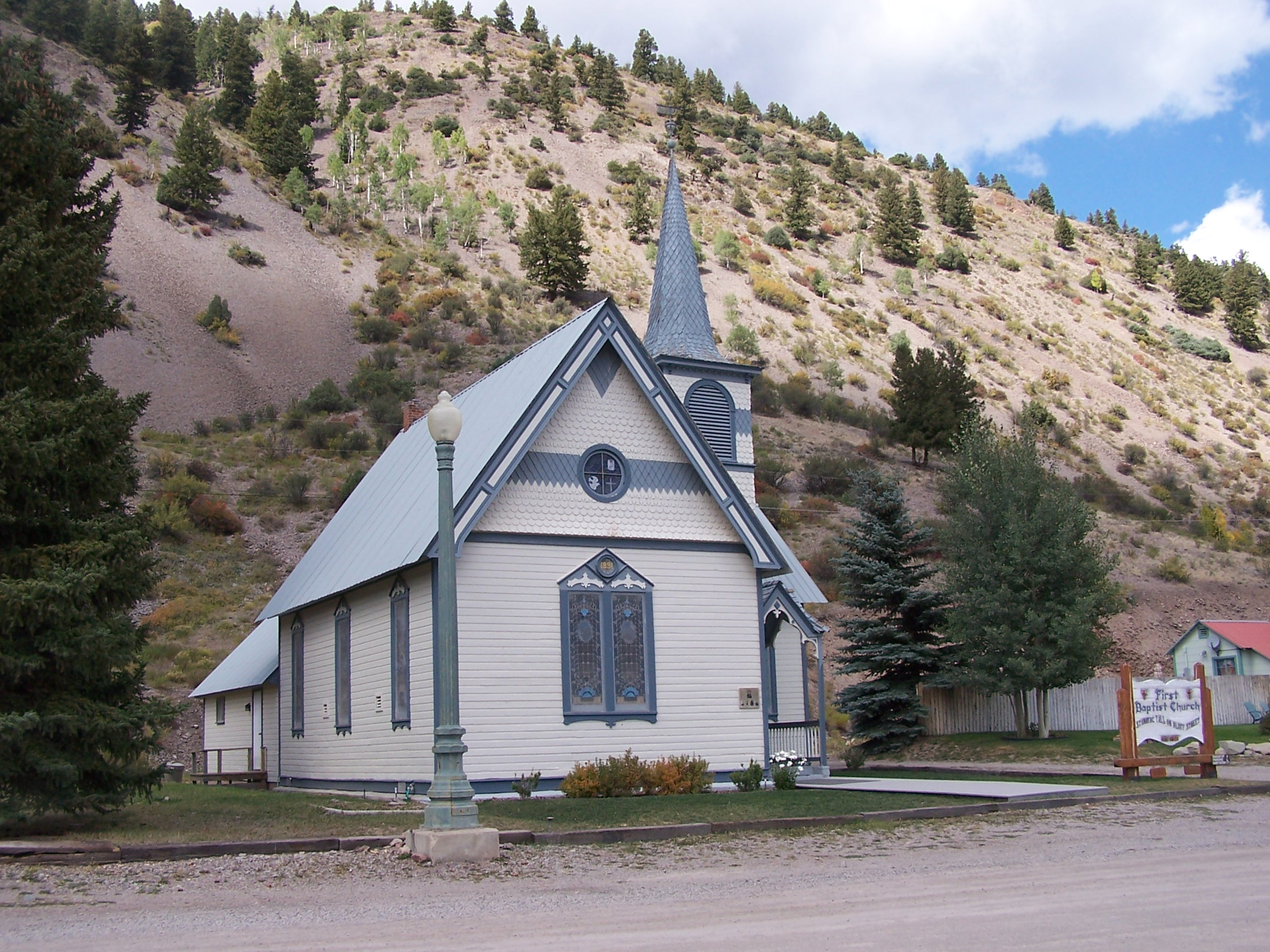
- Baptist Church in Lake City, Colorado.
- Motto: "A Peak Experience"
- Location in Hinsdale County and the state of Colorado
- Coordinates: 38°01′48″N 107°18′38″W
- Country: United States
- State: Colorado
- County: Hinsdale
- Incorporated (town): September 19, 1884

Government
  - Type: Statutory town
  - Mayor: Dave Roberts

Area
  - Total: 0.84 sq mi (2.17 km^{2})
  - Land: 0.83 sq mi (2.14 km^{2})
  - Water: 0.012 sq mi (0.03 km^{2})
- Elevation: 8,672 ft (2,643 m)

Population (2020)
  - Total: 432
  - Density: 523/sq mi (202/km^{2})
- Time zone: UTC-7 (Mountain (MST))
  - Summer (DST): UTC-6 (MDT)
- ZIP code: 81235
- Area code: 970
- FIPS code: 08-42330
- GNIS feature ID: 2412863
- Website: www.townoflakecityco.gov

Lake City is a statutory town that is the county seat of, the most populous community in, and the only incorporated municipality in Hinsdale County, Colorado, United States. The population was 432 at the 2020 census. It is located in the San Juan Mountains in a valley formed by the convergence of Henson Creek and the headwaters of the Lake Fork of the Gunnison River about seven miles (11 km) east of Uncompahgre Peak, a Colorado fourteener. Lake City is named after nearby Lake San Cristobal. This area lies at the southern end of the Colorado Mineral Belt and when rich mineral deposits were discovered the native population was pushed from their tribal lands and the town of Lake City was incorporated in 1873.

== History ==
With the completion of the first road into the mountains in this region, Lake City served as a supply center for the many miners and prospectors flooding into the area. As a supply center, the town boomed to as many as 3,000 to 5,000 settlers. But as the first-discovered deposits were found to be only moderately productive and no new extensive or rich deposits of minerals were found, by 1879 the boom had subsided. With the arrival of the Denver & Rio Grande Railroad in 1889, Lake City saw a second upturn in the economy that lasted into the 1890s. The railroad cut the cost of shipping gold and silver ores to smelters, reduced the cost of shipping supplies into Lake City, and provided shipment of cattle and sheep into the area for summer grazing in the high Alpine meadows.

By 1905, the mining era was over and Lake City entered a decades-long period of economic decline. Population figures hovered at 1,000 then dropped to 400 after 1910. Although mining continued throughout the twentieth century, it consisted primarily of exploration and speculation rather than productive operation. Beginning in 1915, visitors began coming to Lake City for the entire summer season and by the 1930s tourism had emerged as a viable industry.

The Hinsdale County Historical Society formed in 1973 and began accumulating documents and photographs recording the town's history. In 1978, the Lake City Historic District was listed in the National Register of Historic Places. Residents have restored many of the boom town mining era buildings and currently promote tourism as an industry. Restoration has not only aided the local economy by making Lake City a desirable tourist destination, it has served economic development with preservation projects creating jobs for local carpenters, craftsmen, and contractors. Lake City's educational needs are served by the Lake City Community School.

=== Early history ===
Prior to written history, the Ute people lived in this area of the San Juan Mountain Range where they hunted and fished in the high mountain valleys during the summers. Even though the land was owned by the Utes as part of a treaty that set the area aside as a tribal reservation, by the 1860s prospectors had begun to enter the region in search of minerals. When rich silver deposits were found in the Lake City area, word spread, and pressure was put on the federal government to negotiate a new treaty with the Utes. Consequently, the native population was again pushed from their lands when in 1873, a new treaty was negotiated under which the Utes gave up their rights to the San Juan Mountains. In 1873, the town of Lake City was incorporated as a supply center for the prospectors and miners who were flooding the area.

Lake City was platted in fall 1874 during construction of the Saguache & San Juan Wagon Toll Road, which opened the San Juan region for settlement. Town developers chose this location for the town site because of its flat terrain and abundant water. The broad valley provided a park-like setting which the optimistic town developers used to their advantage. They laid out a 260-acre town site that occupied the entire valley floor - 72 blocks of 32 uniform city lots, 25' x 125' in size. To promote the speculative town, Otto Mears subsidized The Silver World newspaper and published the first issue on June 19, 1875. It was the first newspaper published on the Western Slope.

It was not unusual for mining towns to grow into boom towns within a matter of only a few months, and Lake City was no exception. Promoted as the "Metropolis of San Juan", the town flourished as a distribution point for goods and supplies forwarded to mines and camps in the northern Hinsdale County mining districts. The initial influx of pioneers, prospectors, and miners attracted scores of merchants and dozens of lawyers and assayers to provide goods, supplies, and services. Merchants profited by outfitting the surge of prospectors who flooded into the area in 1876 and 1877 and by supplying dozens of mines in the outlying mining districts. The early boom years brought the usual red-light district to Lake City as was seen in any male-dominated mining town of that period. Records from 1878 show that the city had two breweries and a "Hell's Acre" district with 20 saloons, dance halls, and brothels. Lake City had as many as 3,000 to 5,000 residents at one time. But despite this promising activity, northern Hinsdale County's mining districts lacked the three key factors in mining development: year-round transportation, abundant ore, and capital to finance development of underground workings, and by 1879, the boom had subsided. Constructed of rapidly built wooden structures, much of the town was destroyed by a fire in 1879. The town was rebuilt using brick and stone, and consequently many of those structures remain today. By this time Lake City was manufacturing its own building materials using local lumber, locally quarried stone, and bricks made from clay obtained at the nearby Slumgullion Earthflow. The weekly Lake City Mining Register newspaper was published 1880–85. By 1884, the population was beginning to dwindle, but the arrival of the Denver & Rio Grande Railroad on narrow-gauge tracks that were laid in 1889 cut the cost of shipping gold and silver ores to smelters, and the economy saw an upturn which extended into the 1890s.

== Denver and Rio Grande Railroad ==
In 1889, the Denver and Rio Grande Railroad finished laying track from Sapinero to Lake City; the distance spanned 36 miles, with 10 bridges. The "High Bridge" was 800 feet long and 113 feet high. The train averaged 12 miles per hour. According to local residents, "You didn’t want the Rio Grande engine to run over you because 'it was on you so long'." The final cost of the construction of the branch was $770,996.80, a considerable sum at the time. The local newspaper welcomed the arrival of the D&RG:

"The town has awakened from its long sleep; new people and new enterprises are coming in at a rapid rate; outside capital is coming to the rescue, and Lake City is on the eve of a prosperity such as it has never seen before. Mines that have been practically untouched for years are now being profitably worked under the impetus given by ample shipping facilities and cheaper rates; the stores and residences that have been so long vacant are rapidly filling up, and the patient people who have endured the horrors and the hardships of business inactivity for years now wear the smile of gladness and joy."

The Denver & Rio Grande line had additional impacts. The railroad bolstered the ranching industry by shipping cattle raised on ranches along the Lake Fork and by bringing sheep for summer grazing along the Lake Fork valley in northern Hinsdale County. It also linked the isolated location with the rest of the state and nation, encouraging sportsmen and tourists to visit the upper Lake Fork.

== Golden Fleece Mine ==
In 1874, Enos T. Hotchkiss filed a claim five miles south of Lake City which led to the development of the Golden Fleece Mine. Results from preliminary work in the mine were promising, and assay determination indicated the property was rich in high grade telluride and gold ore at a short distance below the surface. But in November 1876, work on the Hotchkiss mine came to an abrupt halt when Hotchkiss was severely injured from a 30-foot fall down a mine shaft. After lying idle for many months, the mine was sold at a sheriff's sale. With new ownership, a rich vein of gold and a large vein of rich telluride ore were discovered in 1892, with one carload valued at more than $19,000. By 1904, it had produced $1,400,000 in silver and gold ore. The ruins of buildings at the Golden Fleece mine are still visible today.

== Alfred Packer ==
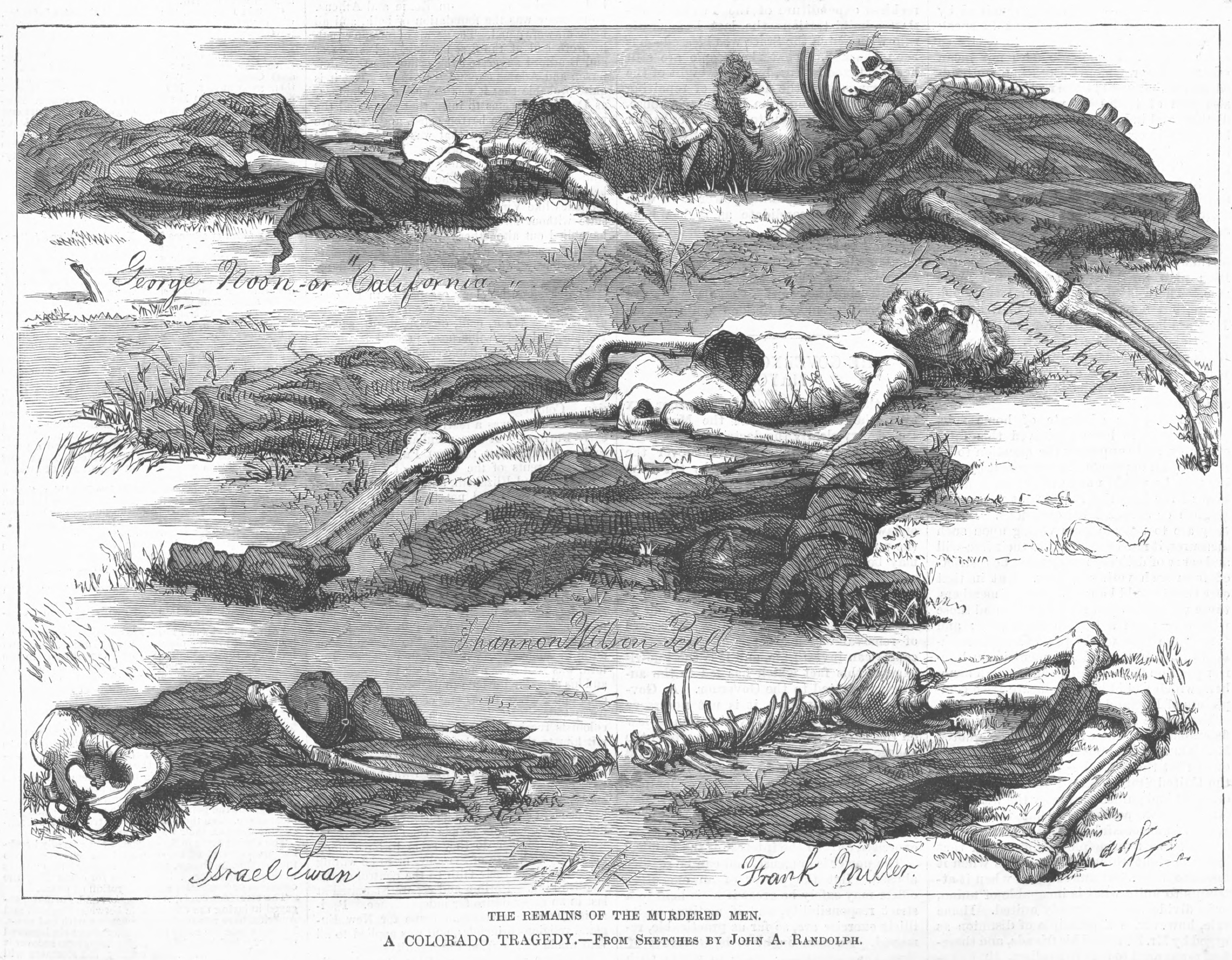
Harper's Weekly, October 17, 1874, illustration of "A Colorado Tragedy".

In 1875, Lake City gained notoriety when Alfred Packer was charged with murder and cannibalism. Due to the nature of the crime, it was sensationalized and gained national attention. There are several differing accounts of the story, but according to one account Packer was acting as a guide for a party of five men prospecting in the San Juan Mountains when they became snowbound for the winter.

When he eventually came out of the mountains in the spring, he said the miners had abandoned him and he had nearly starved. However, because he looked surprisingly healthy and first asked for whiskey rather than food, suspicions began to arise. Five bodies that showed signs of cannibalism were found southeast of Lake City at the foot of Slumgullion Pass, and Packer was arrested and held in the Saguache jail, but escaped. He fled to Cheyenne, Wyoming, where he remained until 1883 when he was again arrested and brought to Lake City for trial. He was convicted of killing one of the five men and sentenced to be hanged. The Colorado Supreme Court reversed the conviction in 1885, but the following year Packer was retried, convicted again, and sentenced to 40 years. He was paroled and released in 1901.

The Hinsdale County Museum, in downtown Lake City, hosts the most extensive collection of Packer memorabilia known, including a skull fragment from one of his victims, a pair of shackles used on Alfred when he was in the Lake City jail, a number of buttons from the clothes of the five men he eventually ate, and dolls and the dollhouse Packer built while in the Lake City Jail. The area where the bodies were discovered is now known as Cannibal Plateau. Packer is remembered by holding an annual Alfred Packer Jeep Tour and Barbecue. The cafeteria in the University of Colorado, Boulder student union is called the Alfred Packer Memorial Grill.

== End of the economic boom days ==
Despite the several booms that were seen in Lake City, it remained a quiet and peaceful village, perhaps because Lake City was founded by the powerful men of the time, such as Otto Meirs, who were speculating on a mineral wealth not yet discovered rather than on actual discoveries of any vastly rich mineral deposits. This village developed by building homes and businesses and moving families in rather than following the pattern of boom towns built for a boom crowd of prospectors having heard of a rich find and hoping to quickly strike it rich, as well. Lake City had four churches, a ball park, and a school, but unlike other boom towns - such as Leadville - few saloons or brothels.

By 1905, the mining era was over and Lake City entered a decades-long period of economic decline. Population figures hovered at 1,000 then dropped to 400 after 1910. Although mining continued throughout the twentieth century, it consisted primarily of exploration and speculation rather than productive operation. Beginning in 1915, visitors began coming to Lake City for the entire summer season, and by the 1930s tourism had emerged as a viable industry. Although a number of properties were lost to fire or deterioration, the prolonged slump protected many of the town's historic properties from substantial alterations or from demolition as has occurred to many other 1870s buildings in Colorado.

== Tourism ==
In the first half of the twentieth century, Lake City's economic base shifted from mining to tourism. People had recognized the area's scenic and recreational resources from the earliest days, however, Lake City's remote location had discouraged visitors. Until the branch of the Denver & Rio Grand Railroad line was completed in 1889, people journeyed by stagecoach 100 miles from Saguache or 140 miles from Del Norte. The rustic Lake Shore Inn opened at Lake San Cristobal in 1917, signaling the era of tourism that has continued into the twenty-first century.

Beginning around 1920, visitors began arriving at Lake City by automobile. This trend grew as highways were developed to Colorado's western slope and roads were improved in Hinsdale County. Early auto tourists stayed in the mining era hotels. Lake City's first auto tourist court opened in 1929. From the 1930s through the 1960s, a half dozen or so tourist accommodations opened each decade in Lake City and along the Lake Fork.

Lake City's mountain environs offered an array of outdoor recreation that encompassed fishing, hunting, boating, mountain climbing, horseback riding, hiking, tent camping, and picnicking. Local merchants accommodated sportsmen; for example, Last Chance Livery and Feed Stable advertised "Fine Saddle Horses" and "Special Arrangements for Fishing and Hunting Parties" at the turn of the century. Lake City Café and Bakery offered to "cook your trout" and packed picnic lunches for visitors. An early booster club promoted boat racing on Lake San Cristobal. Within town, diversions included horse and bicycle racing around a quarter mile-circular track built about 1910 at Ball Flats. Sportsmen were invited to Lake City's "happy hunting grounds" and promised "if you make Lake City your camp headquarters you can be sure of bagging your buck." Game included deer, elk, bear, bighorn sheep, and wild turkey. Uncompahgre Peak and the surrounding mountains were covered by abandoned mining roads that became hiking trails, routes for trail rides and pack rides, and, later, jeep roads.

In the 1930s and 1940s, Lake City's isolated location and deteriorating buildings gave tourists and summer residents a sense of escaping from civilization. As in other isolated mountain towns, bootlegging and gambling created the allure of lawlessness. In 1949, a Denver Post reporter spoke of the town's numerous slot machines: "Virtually every business place in Lake City has one or more machines… The post office and telephone office are almost the only exceptions."

== Lake City National Historic District ==
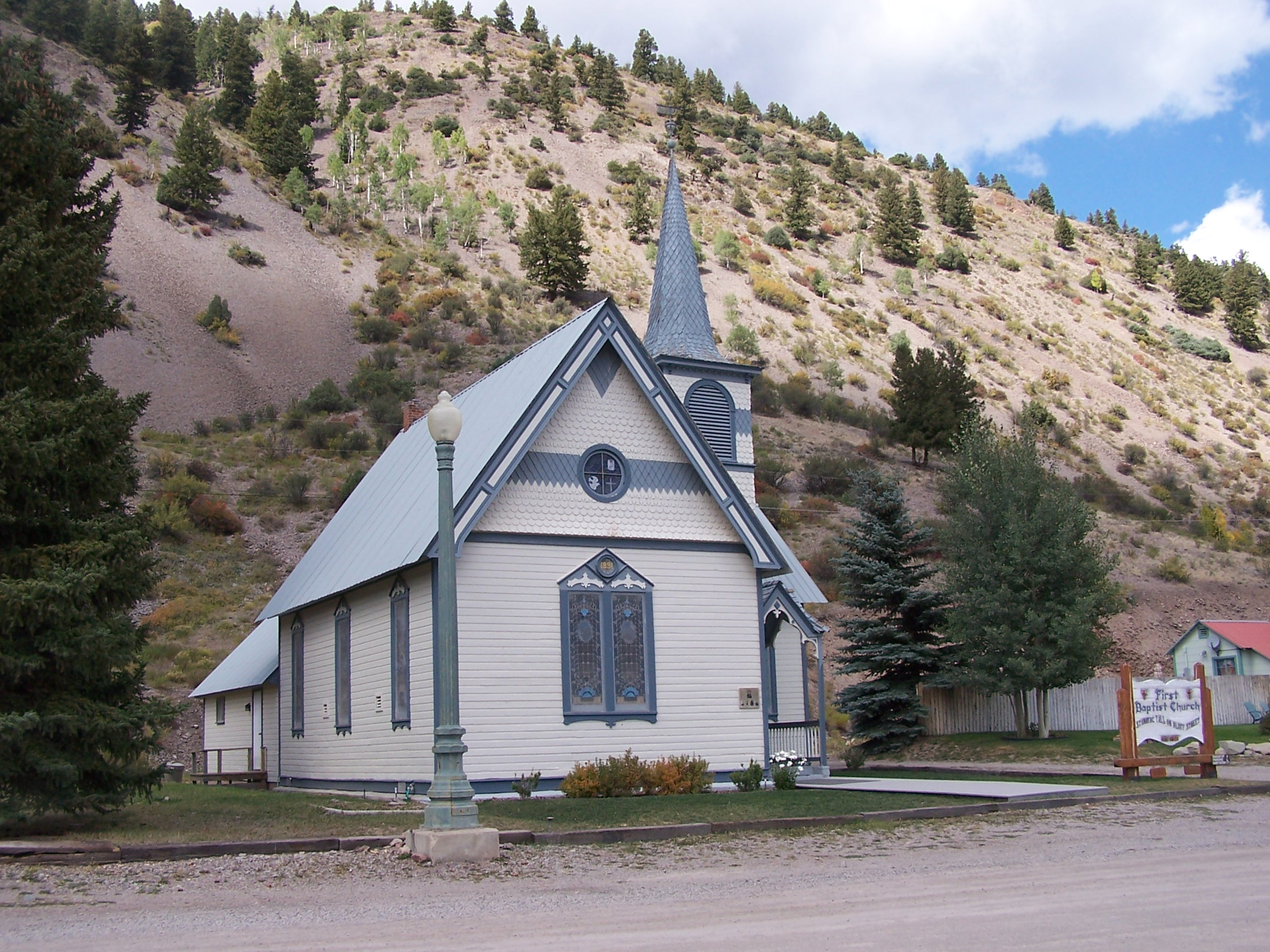
Baptist Church in Lake City, Colorado

The Lake City Historic District contains a collection of intact buildings associated with the 1875-1881 boom as well as buildings constructed during the second boom period of the 1890s. The town's remote location and decades of economic decline helped conserve the buildings from the mining era, and the weak local economy discouraged new construction. The Hinsdale County Historical Society formed in 1973 and began accumulating documents and photographs recording the town's history, and has been a strong advocate for preservation in Lake City since then. In 1978, the Lake City Historic District was listed in the National Register of Historic Places.

In some cases restoration was as simple as removing a coat of paint from a brick building or removing a wood facade from an early building faced with stone, but in other cases more involved restoration was required. During the 1970s and 1980s, volunteers performed extensive preservation work on the Baptist church building, which had stood vacant and derelict in the 1930s. Hinsdale County acquired the John C. Bell cabin at 304 Third Street and restored it in 2000, removing stucco siding to reveal the 1876 log cabin that had served as the law office for Lake City's leading attorney in the 1880s. Also, many individual property owners have done restoration and upkeep to preserve their historic properties. Restoration has not only aided the local economy by making Lake City a desirable tourist destination, it has also served economic development with preservation projects creating jobs for local carpenters, craftsmen, and contractors.

== Demographics ==
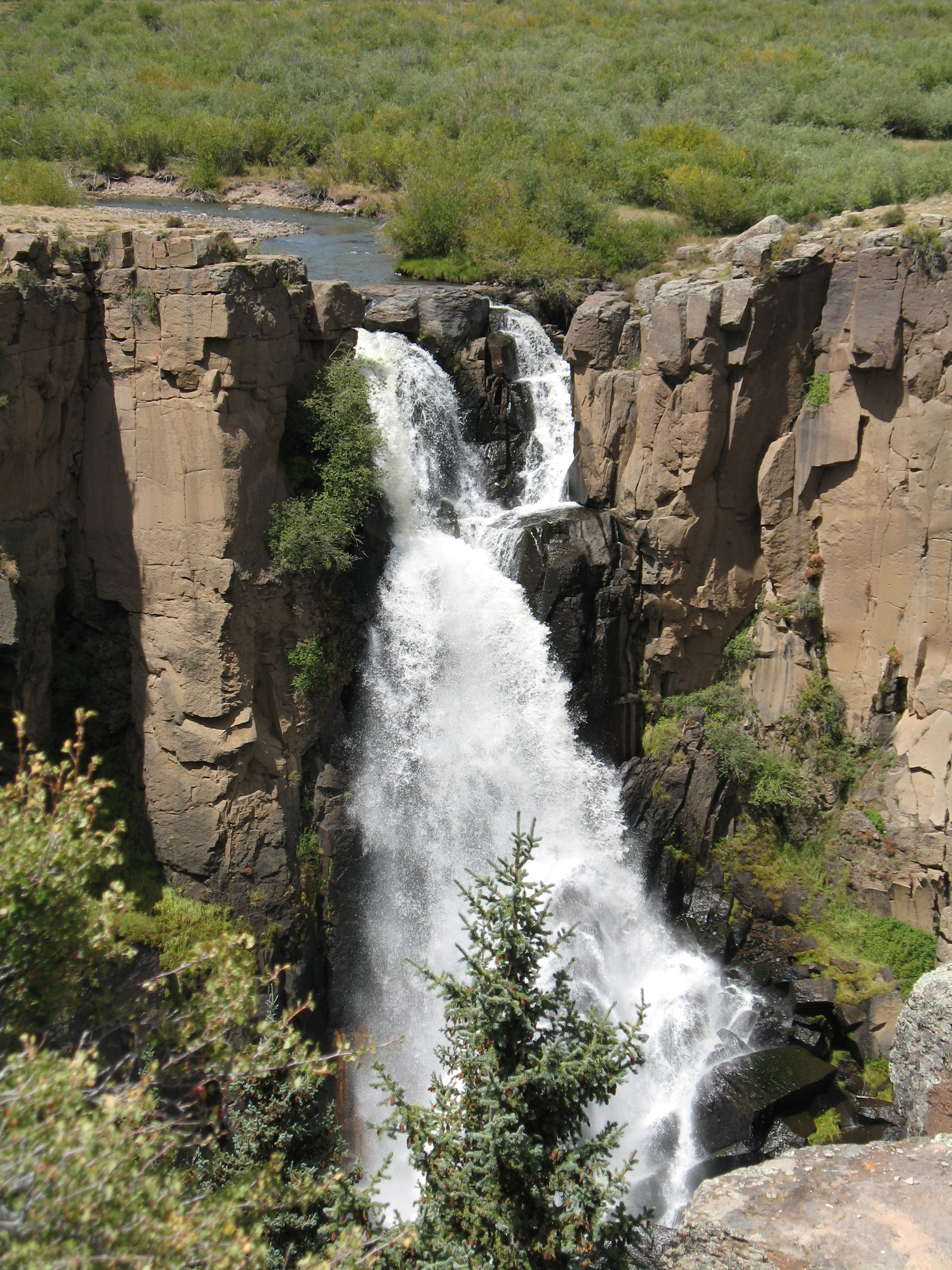
North Clear Creek Falls Observation Site Overlook, Rio Grande National Forest

Historical population
Census	Pop.	Note	%±
1890	607		—
1900	700		15.3%
1910	405		−42.1%
1920	317		−21.7%
1930	259		−18.3%
1940	185		−28.6%
1950	141		−23.8%
1960	106		−24.8%
1970	91		−14.2%
1980	206		126.4%
1990	223		8.3%
2000	375		68.2%
2010	408		8.8%
2020	432		5.9%

== Geography and climate ==
According to the United States Census Bureau, the town has a total area of 0.9 square miles (2.3 km^{2}), of which, 0.8 square miles (2.1 km^{2}) of it is land and 1.18% is water.

Lake City experiences a continental climate (Köppen climate classification Dfb) that only just escapes being classified as semi-arid due to its relatively wet early springs and late autumns. On average, the wettest month is August, and the driest is February. Very large daily temperature swings are a regular feature of Lake City's climate, due to the elevation and aridity.

Climate data for Lake City, Colorado, 1991–2020 normals, extremes 1905–2010
Month	Jan	Feb	Mar	Apr	May	Jun	Jul	Aug	Sep	Oct	Nov	Dec	Year
Record high °F (°C)	57 (14)	62 (17)	68 (20)	78 (26)	83 (28)	91 (33)	98 (37)	90 (32)	88 (31)	80 (27)	70 (21)	59 (15)	98 (37)
Mean daily maximum °F (°C)	33.8 (1.0)	37.7 (3.2)	46.2 (7.9)	53.4 (11.9)	64.8 (18.2)	73.9 (23.3)	76.7 (24.8)	73.7 (23.2)	69.1 (20.6)	59.7 (15.4)	46.1 (7.8)	34.0 (1.1)	55.8 (13.2)
Daily mean °F (°C)	17.4 (−8.1)	22.8 (−5.1)	31.5 (−0.3)	39.1 (3.9)	48.7 (9.3)	57.1 (13.9)	61.7 (16.5)	59.5 (15.3)	53.4 (11.9)	43.8 (6.6)	30.5 (−0.8)	18.5 (−7.5)	40.3 (4.6)
Mean daily minimum °F (°C)	1.1 (−17.2)	7.9 (−13.4)	16.8 (−8.4)	24.7 (−4.1)	32.7 (0.4)	40.3 (4.6)	46.7 (8.2)	45.3 (7.4)	37.6 (3.1)	27.8 (−2.3)	14.9 (−9.5)	3.0 (−16.1)	24.9 (−3.9)
Record low °F (°C)	−38 (−39)	−30 (−34)	−26 (−32)	−18 (−28)	7 (−14)	16 (−9)	25 (−4)	25 (−4)	12 (−11)	−2 (−19)	−20 (−29)	−32 (−36)	−38 (−39)
Average precipitation inches (mm)	0.83 (21)	0.65 (17)	0.76 (19)	1.02 (26)	1.06 (27)	0.71 (18)	2.12 (54)	2.45 (62)	1.56 (40)	1.27 (32)	0.88 (22)	0.96 (24)	14.27 (362)
Average snowfall inches (cm)	13.8 (35)	10.5 (27)	12.6 (32)	8.2 (21)	4.0 (10)	trace	0.0 (0.0)	0.0 (0.0)	0.6 (1.5)	3.4 (8.6)	12.4 (31)	13.2 (34)	78.7 (200.1)
Average precipitation days (≥ 0.01 in)	5.8	5.4	6.3	6.2	5.2	5.1	11.1	14.4	9.4	6.9	5.0	4.9	85.7
Average snowy days (≥ 0.1 in)	5.7	5.1	6.3	3.8	1.5	0.1	0.0	0.0	0.1	1.4	4.9	5.6	34.5
Source 1: NOAA (snow/snow days 1981–2010)
Source 2: XMACIS2

Climate data for Lake City 1NNE, Colorado, 1991–2020 normals: 8,714 ft (2,656 m)
Month	Jan	Feb	Mar	Apr	May	Jun	Jul	Aug	Sep	Oct	Nov	Dec	Year
Mean daily maximum °F (°C)	31.3 (−0.4)	35.9 (2.2)	43.3 (6.3)	51.4 (10.8)	61.9 (16.6)	73.6 (23.1)	77.4 (25.2)	74.5 (23.6)	68.2 (20.1)	57.5 (14.2)	42.7 (5.9)	31.3 (−0.4)	54.1 (12.3)
Daily mean °F (°C)	15.2 (−9.3)	19.7 (−6.8)	29.2 (−1.6)	37.2 (2.9)	46.0 (7.8)	55.8 (13.2)	60.8 (16.0)	58.9 (14.9)	52.3 (11.3)	41.2 (5.1)	27.7 (−2.4)	16.0 (−8.9)	38.3 (3.5)
Mean daily minimum °F (°C)	−0.9 (−18.3)	3.5 (−15.8)	15.1 (−9.4)	22.9 (−5.1)	30.1 (−1.1)	37.9 (3.3)	44.1 (6.7)	43.3 (6.3)	36.4 (2.4)	24.8 (−4.0)	12.6 (−10.8)	0.7 (−17.4)	22.5 (−5.3)
Average precipitation inches (mm)	1.22 (31)	1.05 (27)	1.00 (25)	1.60 (41)	1.26 (32)	0.85 (22)	2.03 (52)	2.55 (65)	1.61 (41)	1.83 (46)	1.06 (27)	1.06 (27)	17.12 (436)
Source: NOAA

== Notable people ==
- Montana F. Smith, Colorado state legislator

== See also ==
- Alpine Loop National Scenic Back Country Byway
- Slumgullion Pass
- Uncompahgre Peak
