= Red Mountain Town, Colorado =

Ghost town in Ouray County, Colorado

Red Mountain Town
- Mining ghost town
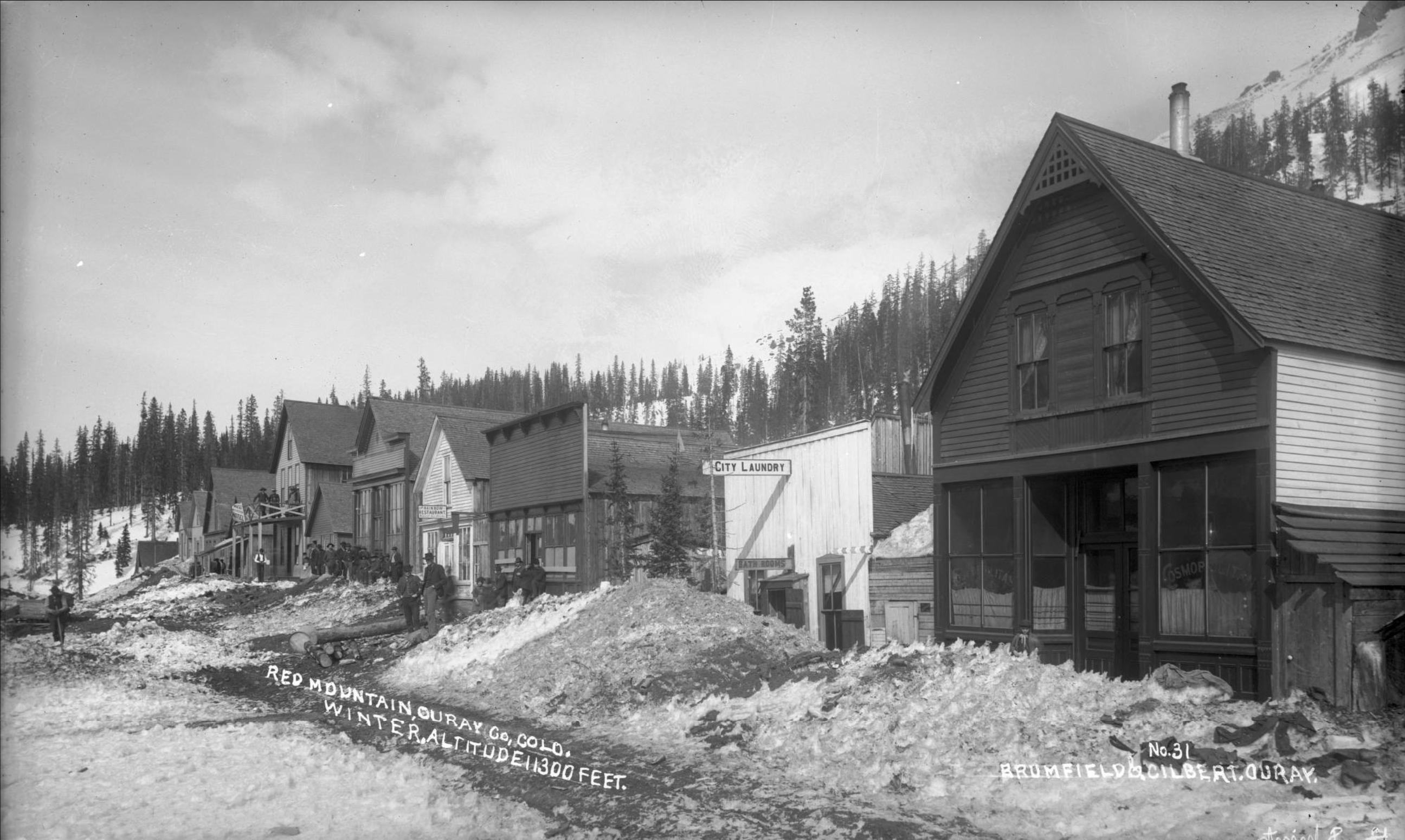
- Business district in Red Mountain Town

- Location within the state of Colorado
- Coordinates: 37°54′13″N 107°42′09″W
- Country: United States
- State: Colorado
- County: Ouray
- Elevation: 10,935 ft (3,333 m)

Population (2010)
  - Total: 0
- Time zone: UTC-7 (Mountain (MST))
  - Summer (DST): UTC-6 (MDT)
- ZIP codes: 81432
- GNIS feature ID: 187310(dead link)

Red Mountain Town is a silver-mining ghost town in Ouray County, Colorado, United States, south of Ouray along the "Million Dollar Highway" (U.S. Route 550).

== History ==
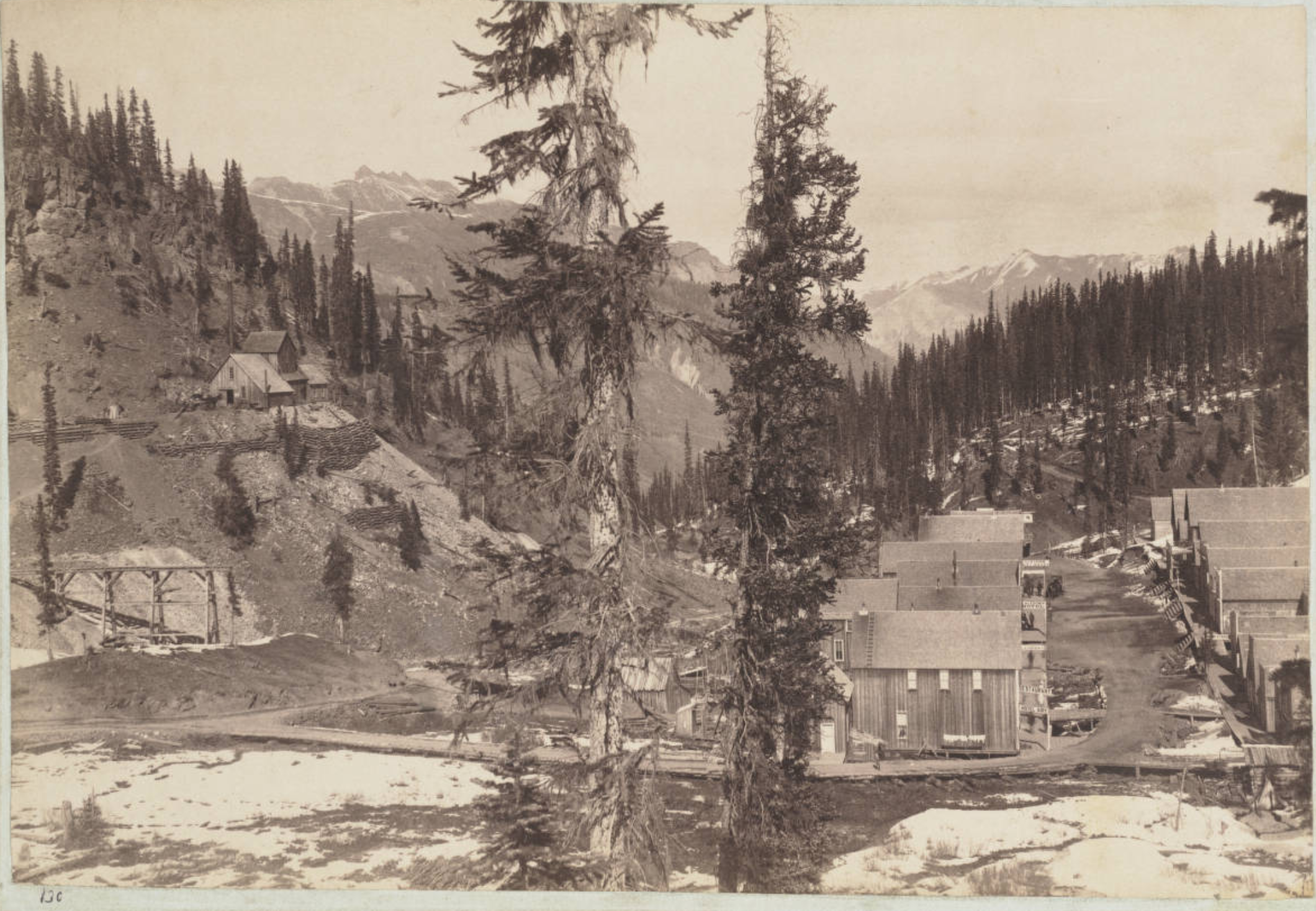
Main street, business district, and National Belle Mine of Red Mountain Town, Colorado, c. 1890

While there were gold mining efforts near Red Mountain during the 1870s, it was not until silver discoveries in 1882 that a more permanent population arrived, seeing the foundation of a town. Red Mountain Town, as it would become known, formed part of the Red Mountain Pass mining district between Silverton and Ouray. Alongside the Ironton, Guston, Sweetville, Rogerville, and Park City, Red Mountain Town formed a corridor through which the Silverton Railroad narrow-gauge ran, delivering ore to be processed in and transported from Silverton. These communities eventually consolidated until almost all residents of the area lived within Red Mountain Town, Ironton, or Guston. The townsite was moved during its first year due to the discovery that the unfrozen spring around which the first townsite was constructed turned the area into an uninhabitable marsh.

The communities in the Red Mountain mining district had a long-running rivalry that saw frequent brawls between residents of the neighboring towns. In 1892, English congregationalist preacher Rev. William Davis attempted to found a church in Red Mountain Town, but the townsfolk rejected him. However, Guston residents accepted Davis and a church was opened that same year. The day following the church's opening, the business district of Red Mountain Town burned, spurring some to claim it was an act of divine intervention. Fires such as this one spurred the town to move several times.

Despite its location in the second-largest silver-mining district in Colorado, its proximity to the major Yankee Girl and Idarado Mines, and a peak population over 1,000 people, Red Mountain Town is now a ghost town. As of July 2000, several wooden residential and mining structures still stood, with others in various states of collapse and decay. Mounds of yellow tailings were also visible.

== See also ==
- List of ghost towns in Colorado
