= Red Mountain (Ouray County, Colorado) =

Mountain in Colorado, United States

Red Mountain Number 3
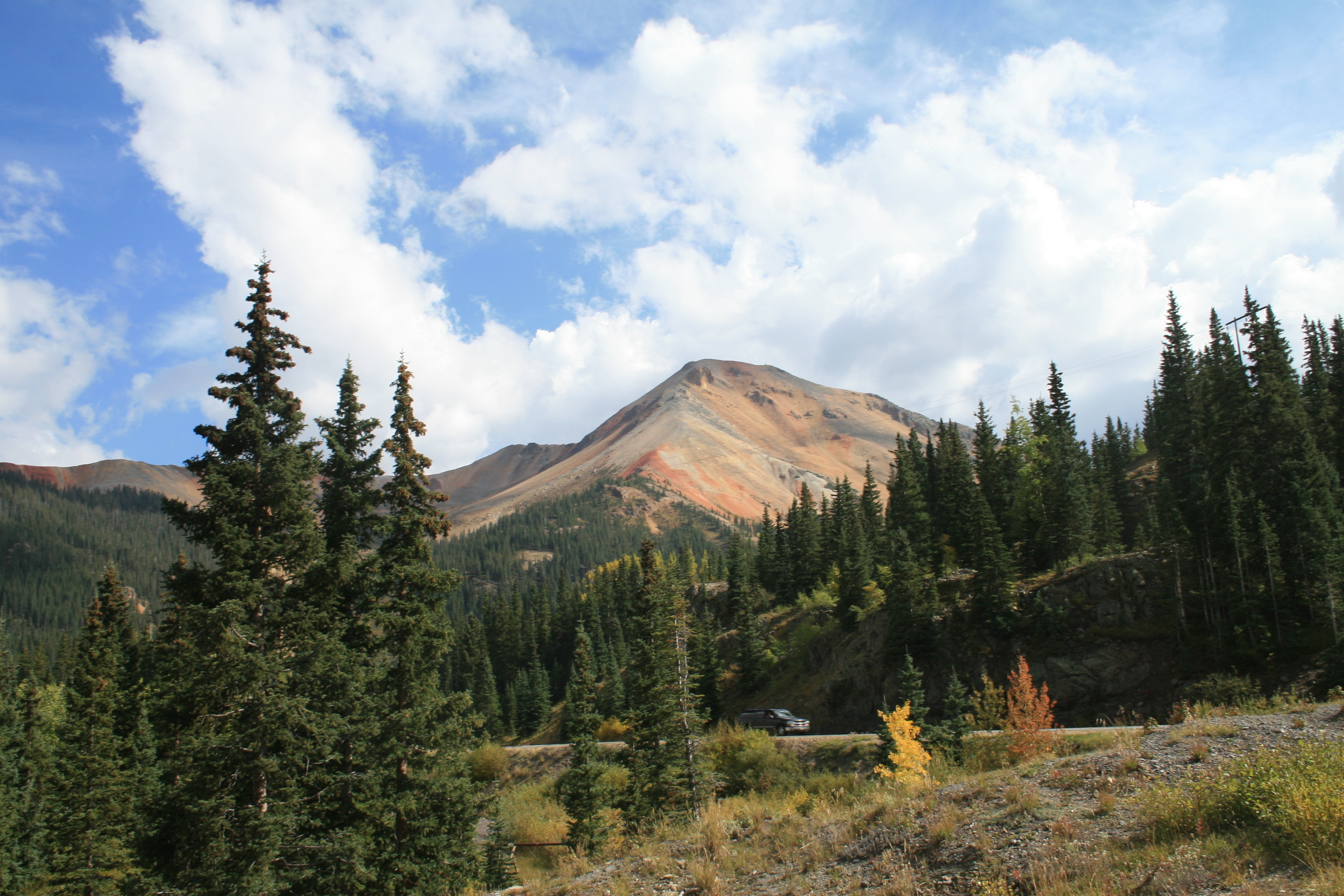
- Red Mountain Number 3

Highest point
- Elevation: 12,896 ft (3,931 m)
- Coordinates: 37°54′06″N 107°41′21″W

Geography
- Location within Colorado
- Location: Ouray and San Juan counties, Colorado, U.S.
- Parent range: San Juan Mountains
- Topo map(s): USGS 7.5' topographic map Ironton, Colorado

Red Mountain Number 1
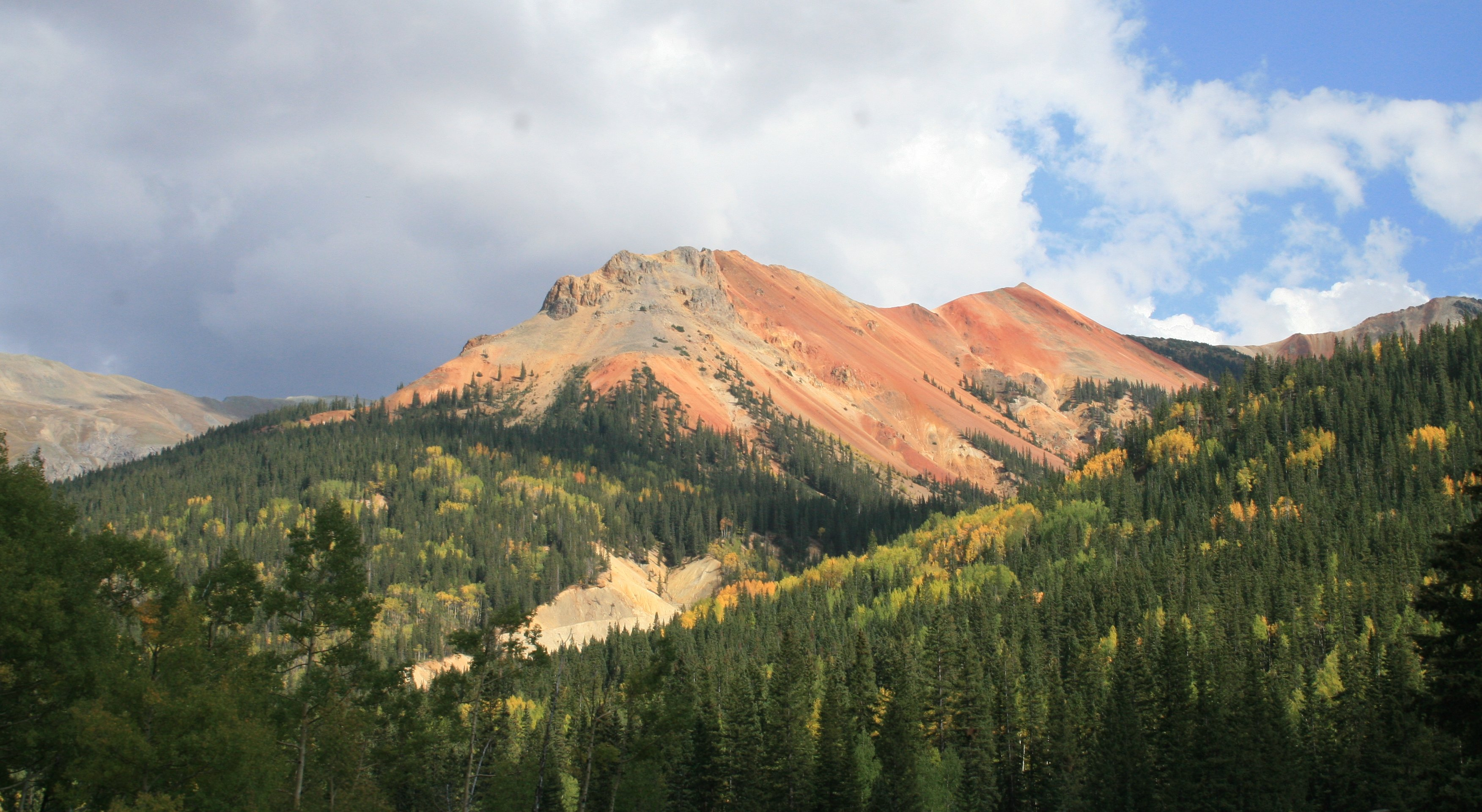
- Red Mountain Number 1

Highest point
- Elevation: 12,598 ft (3,840 m)
- Coordinates: 37°54′37″N 107°39′44″W

Geography
- Location: Ouray and San Juan counties, Colorado, U.S.

Red Mountain Number 2
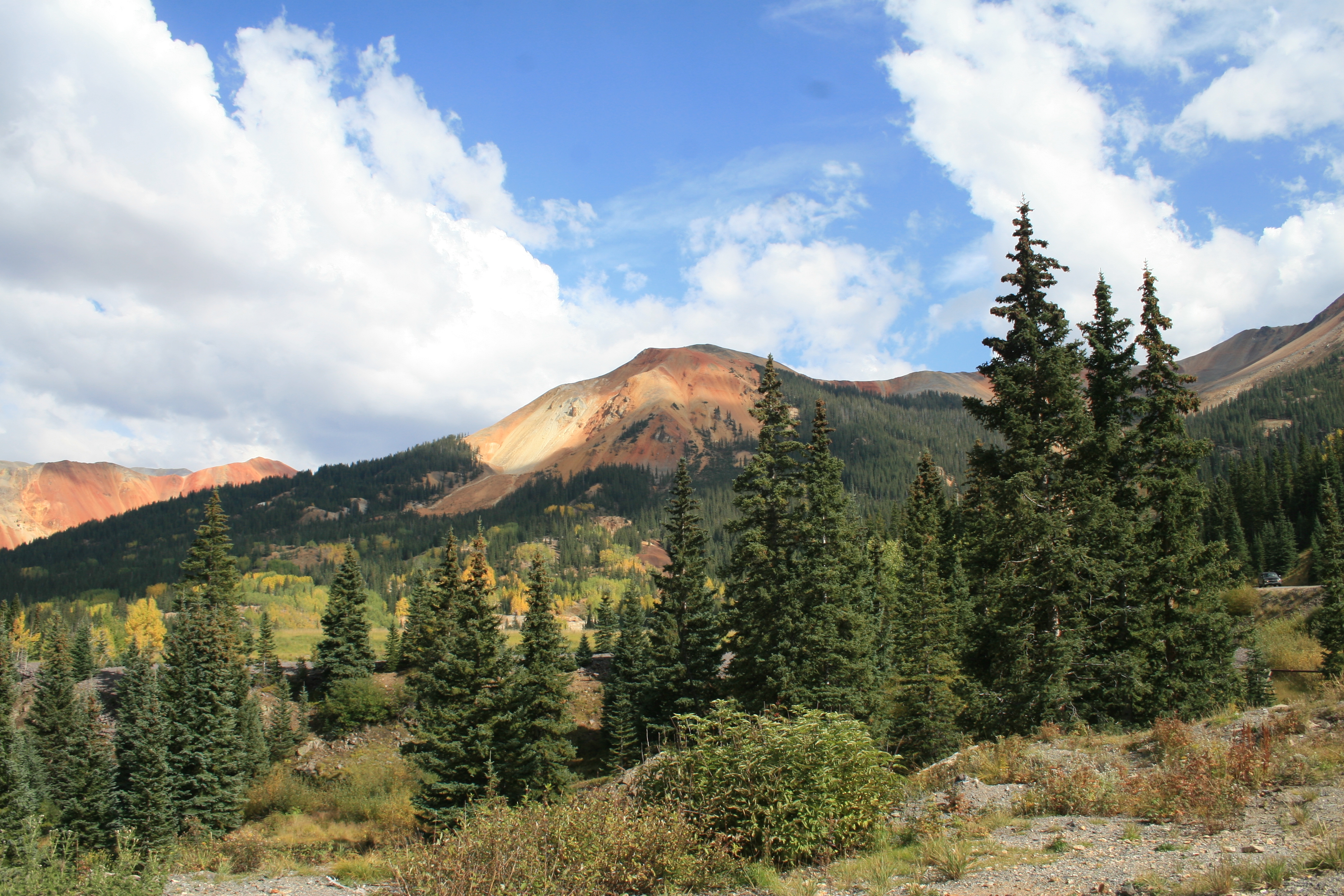
- Red Mountain Number 2

Highest point
- Elevation: 12,225 ft (3,726 m)
- Coordinates: 37°54′46″N 107°40′57″W

Geography
- Location: Ouray County, Colorado, U.S.

Red Mountain is a set of three peaks in the San Juan Mountains of western Colorado in the United States, about five miles (8.0 km) south of Ouray. The mountains get their name from the reddish iron ore rocks that cover the surface. Several other peaks in the San Juan Mountains likewise have prominent reddish coloration from iron ore and are also called "Red Mountain".

Nearby Red Mountain Pass is named after Red Mountain, and the ghost town mining camp of Red Mountain Town is located around Red Mountain.

== Red Mountain Town ==
Following sporadic settling of the region in the 1870s, a series of permanent mining towns were founded in what became known as the Red Mountain Mining District. Among these was Red Mountain Town, which was founded following discoveries of silver in 1882. Other communities in the area included Ironton and Guston, which were eventually connected with the larger towns of Silverton and Ouray via the Silverton Railroad and later the Million Dollar Highway.

== Gallery ==
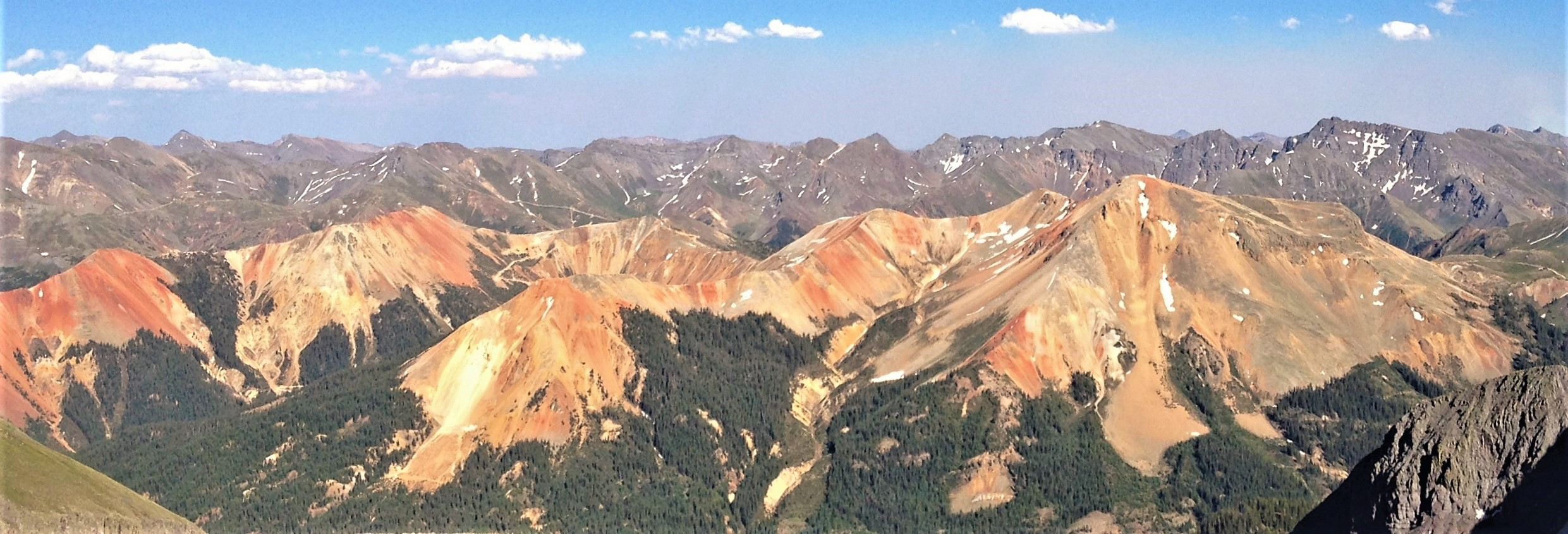
West aspect, from Imogene Pass

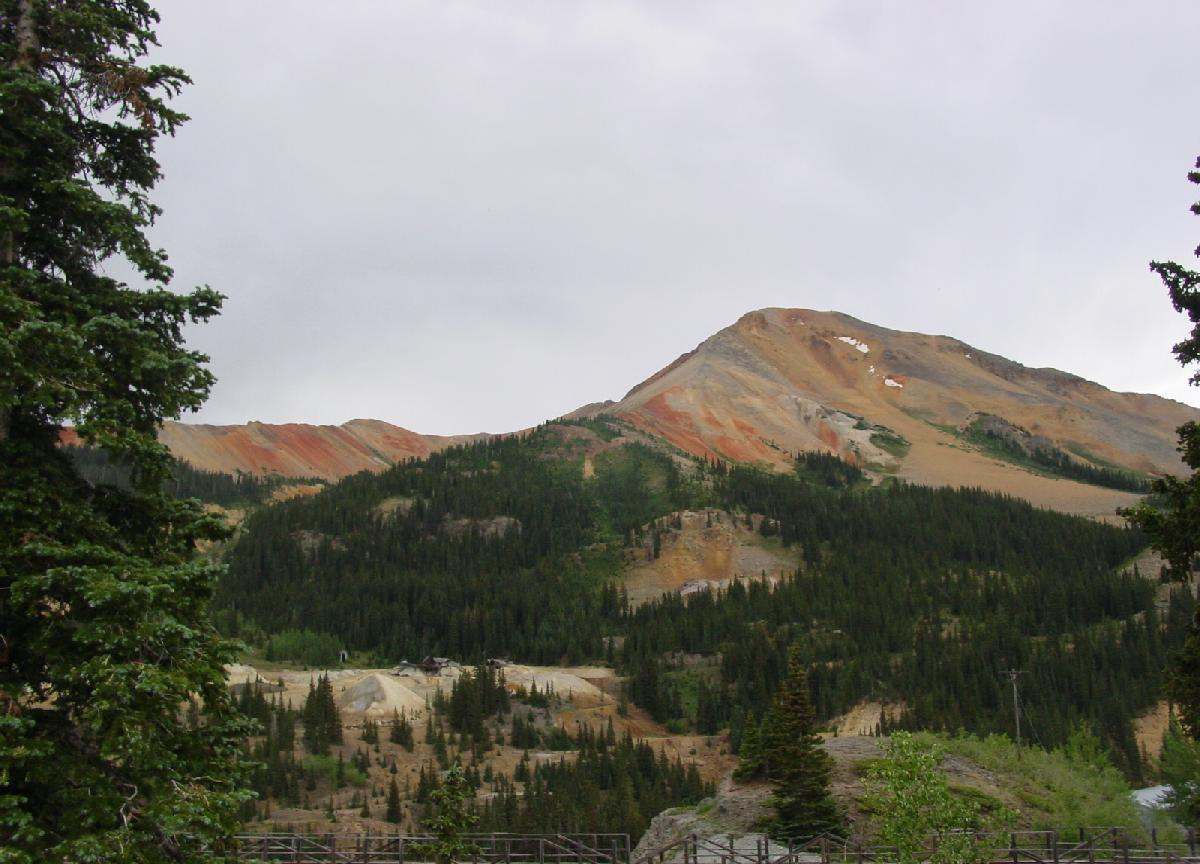
Red Mountain Number 3 with the ghost town of Red Mountain.

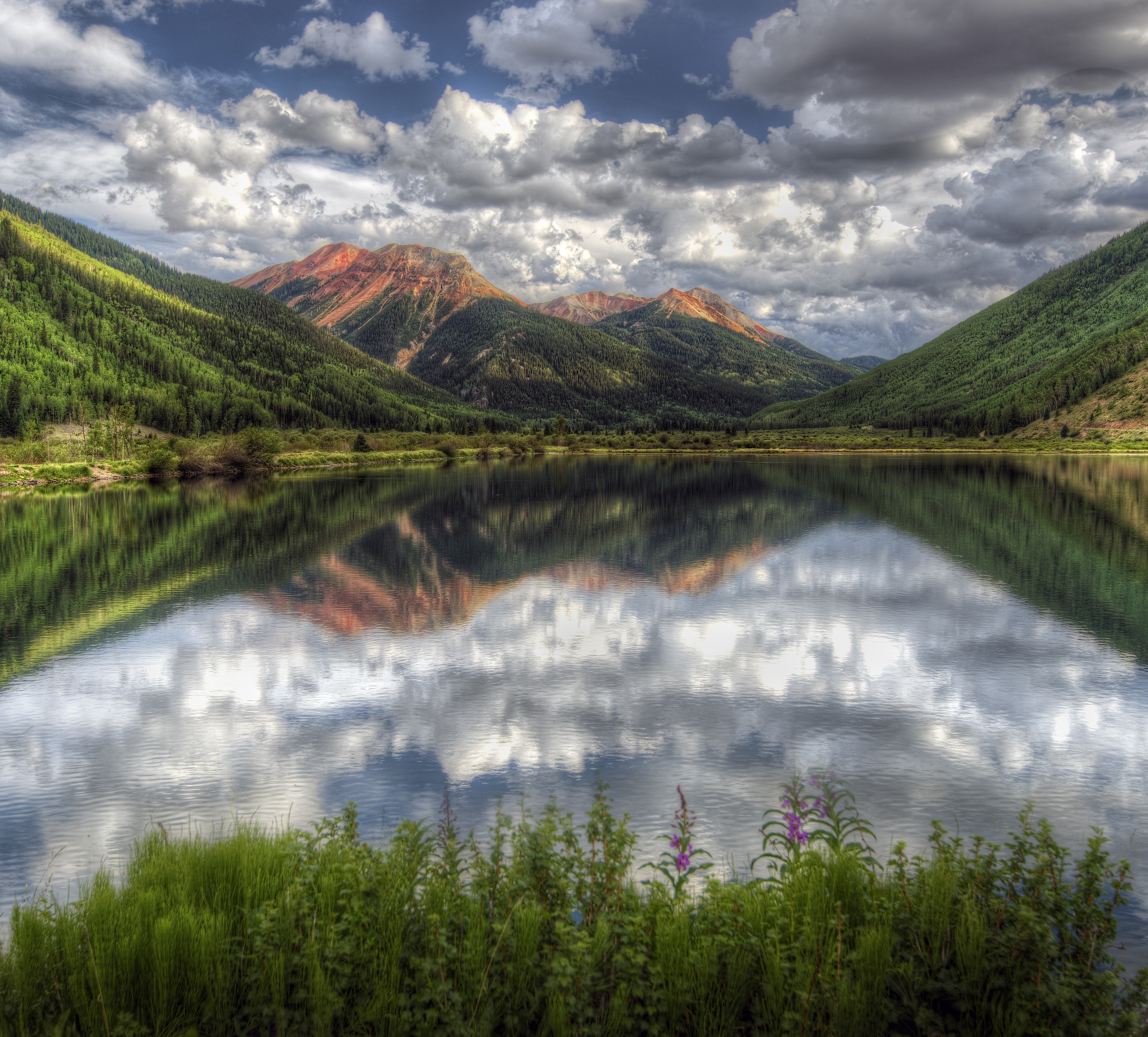
Red Mountain reflected in Crystal Lake

== See also ==
- List of Colorado mountain ranges
- List of Colorado mountain summits
  - List of Colorado fourteeners
  - List of Colorado 4000 meter prominent summits
  - List of the most prominent summits of Colorado
- List of Colorado county high points
