= Silverton, Gladstone and Northerly Railroad =

The Silverton, Gladstone and Northerly Railroad was incorporated in 1899 after Otto Mears and associates were unable to procure financing to build a branch of the Silverton Northern Railroad to the mining area around the town of Gladstone. The railroad was chartered in 1899 by the Gold King Mining Co. to haul ore from the mines on Cement Creek to the Silverton smelters. It was 7.5 miles long and had .5 miles of spurs. It was leased by the Silverton Northern in 1910. (Mears leased the Silverton Northern in the same year and purchased the SN outright in 1915, although traffic was discontinued soon thereafter.)

Construction began from the mainline of the SN on the north side of Silverton, and followed Cement Creek northward to the town of Gladstone. At one time, an extension to the Silver Lake Mine was proposed, but no further construction ever was accomplished. The line served the Kendrick and Gelder (or Gilder) smelter, later run by the Ross Mining and Milling Co., the McKinley sawmill, the Boston & Silverton Milling and Reduction (Yukon Mill) site, the Anglo Saxon mine, the Mammouth Mine, the Henriette(a) mine, Fisher's sawmill, the Gold King mine and the Mogul mill.

Following the ups and downs of the metals markets, the SG&N was finally absorbed by the Silverton Northern Railroad in 1915, being operated as the Gladstone Branch. The line was dismantled between 1938 and 1942.

The railroad had connections with both the Denver & Rio Grande and also the Silverton Northern at Silverton.

== Roster ==
Locomotives
Number	Builder	Type	Serial number	Built	Acquired	Retired	Disposition/Notes
32	Baldwin Locomotive Works	2-8-0	5185	1880	1889	1911	Built as Denver & Rio Grande #78. Sold to Rio Grande Southern #32 in 1891. Sold in 1900 to SG&N#32. Scrapped in 1911.
33	Baldwin Locomotive Works	2-8-0	5225	1880	1900	1923	Built as Denver & Rio Grande #79. Sold to Rio Grande Southern #33 in 1891. Sold in 1900 to SG&N#33. Scrapped in 1923.
34	Baldwin Locomotive Works	2-8-0	24130	1904	1904	1915	Built and Acquired New. Sold in 1915 to Silverton Northern #34. Sold in 1942 to White Pass & Yukon #24. Scrapped at Skagway, AK in 1951.

Passenger Cars
Number	Builder	Build Date	Notes
Combination Car #1	Unknown	1899	Retired at an unknown date.
Combination Car #2	American Car and Foundry	1905	Sold to the Silverton Northern Railroad in 1915. Retired at an unknown date.

Boxcars
Number	Builder	Build Date	Notes
#1000	Unknown	1899	Sold to the Silverton Northern Railroad in 1915 and became #2000. Retired at an unknown date.
#1001	Unknown	1899	Sold to the Silverton Northern Railroad in 1915 and became #2001. Retired at an unknown date.
#1002	Unknown	1899	Sold to the Silverton Northern Railroad in 1915 and became #2002. Retired at an unknown date.
#1003	Unknown	1899	Sold to the Silverton Northern Railroad in 1915 and became #2003. Retired at an unknown date. Converted into a storage shed after the Silverton Northern was abandoned. The shed was moved south of Silverton near the Champion Mine where it still remains today.
#1004	Unknown	1899	Sold to the Silverton Northern Railroad in 1915 and became #2004. Retired at an unknown date.
#1005	Unknown	1899	Sold to the Silverton Northern Railroad in 1915 and became #2005. Retired at an unknown date.
#1006	Unknown	1899	Sold to the Silverton Northern Railroad in 1915 and became #2006. Retired at an unknown date.
#1007	Unknown	1899	Sold to the Silverton Northern Railroad in 1915 and became #2007 (photos contradict that the car was ever renumbered to #2007). Retired at an unknown date. Converted into a storage shed after the Silverton Northern was abandoned. The shed was moved south of Silverton near the Champion Mine where it still remains today.
#1008	Unknown	1899	Sold to the Silverton Northern Railroad in 1915 and became #2008. Retired at an unknown date.
#1009	Unknown	1899	Sold to the Silverton Northern Railroad in 1915 and became #2009. Retired at an unknown date.

- See link: http://www.drgw.net/info/SilvertonGladstoneAmpNortherly
