= Guston, Colorado =

Ghost town in Ouray County, Colorado, United States

Guston
- Mining ghost town
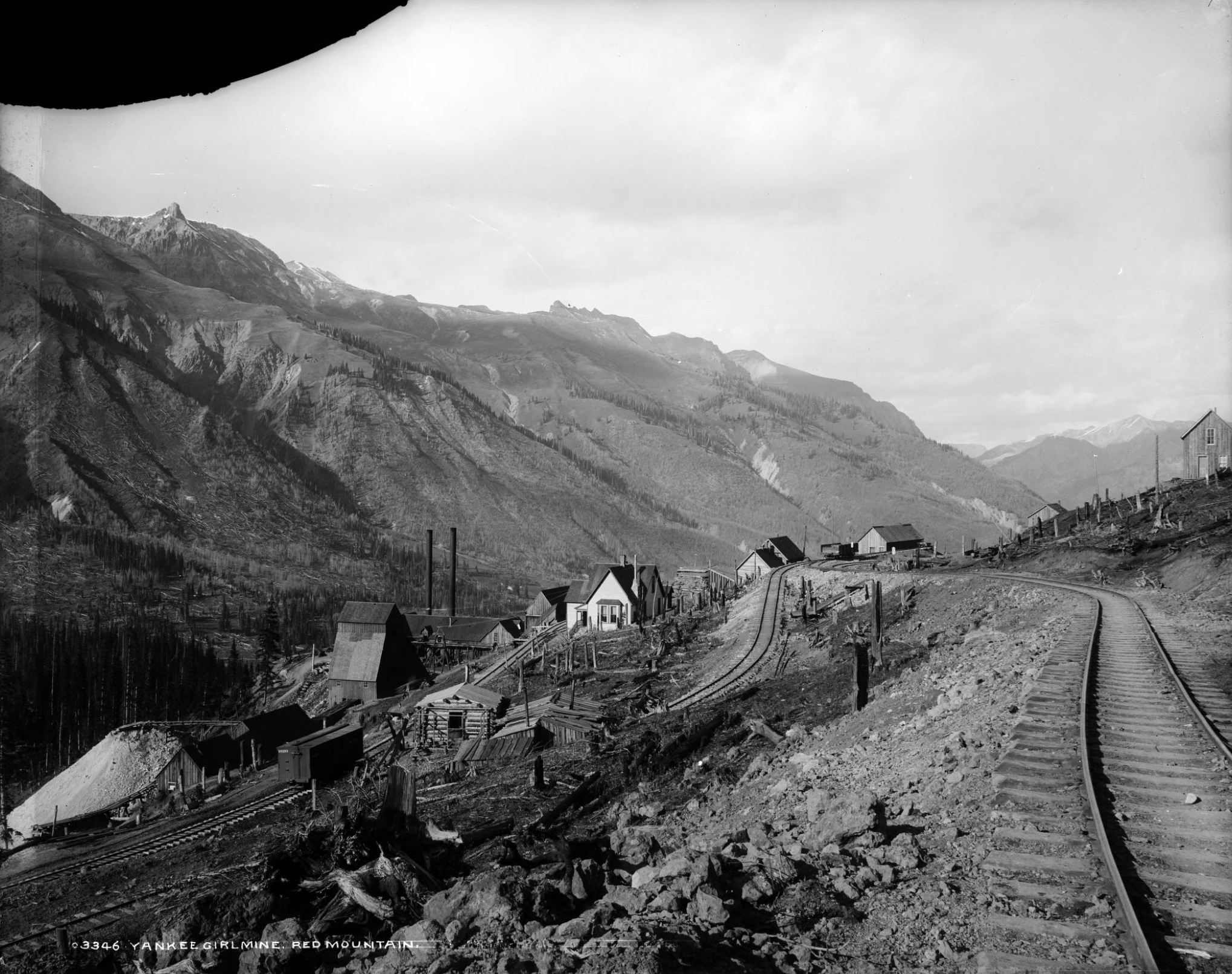
- Yankee Girl Mine at Guston, c. 1889

- Location within the state of Colorado
- Coordinates: 37.9164°N 107.6903°W
- Country: United States
- State: Colorado
- County: Ouray
- Elevation: 10,847 ft (3,306 m)

Population (2010)
  - Total: 0
- Time zone: UTC-7 (Mountain (MST))
  - Summer (DST): UTC-6 (MDT)
- ZIP codes: 81432
- GNIS feature ID: 187238

Guston is a silver mining ghost town in Ouray County, Colorado, United States, 11 miles (18 km) south of Ouray following the "Million Dollar Highway" (U.S. Route 550). Nestled in Champion Gulch, it is located near Red Mountain and the remnants of Red Mountain Town and Ironton. The Silverton Railroad ran from Guston in the Red Mountain Pass to Silverton in San Juan County. The silver mining camp was established in 1883. The Guston post office operated from January 26, 1892, until November 16, 1898.

== Description ==
While there was initially talk of naming the settlement "Missouri City," the name of the first mine in the area was instead selected. The town was never formally instituted and construction of commercial and residential structures occurred in an ad hoc fashion.

By July 2000, the remains of Guston were composed of several mining structures and a bridge that carried the Silverton Railroad through town. One entrance to the Idarado Mine, Treasury Tunnel, is still visible. The church and many other buildings had partially or fully collapsed by the mid-1940s. Parts of the ghost town are open to the public and have signage describing the town's history. By 2012, the railroad depot had been rendered largely unrecognizable by falling trees and wind.

== History ==
Guston was founded in 1883 as a mining community, supporting the miners at the Guston-Robinson, the Yankee Girl, and the Genessee-Vanderbilt mines. In 1888, the noted railroad and later toll road financier Otto Mears established the narrow gauge Silverton Railroad to connect the Red Mountain Mining District with the larger settlement of Silverton. The railroad reached Guston in 1889 and by 1892 the town sported a post office and a newspaper, the Guston Paralyzer.

While mining operations in the area started slowly, the August 1884 arrival of new management under mining engineer T. E. Schwarts saw a dramatic increase in all facets of the mines, including profit. During his five years as superintendent, Yankee Girl went from a depth of 100 feet (30 m) to 1,000 feet (300 m) with a hoist system that, as of 2014, was still standing. Total profits of that mine grew to $1,000,000 USD ($28,300,000 in 2021), while other mines also substantially increased their profits under Schwarts's tenure. Roughly 10 tons of ore left for Silverton each day. At its peak, the town was home to roughly 300 people.

English congregationalist preacher Rev. William Davis found some success evangelizing the miners and their families after establishing a church in Guston in 1892, the only one in the Red Mountain Mining District. The church had not only a bell but also a steam whistle to announce when services were commencing. Davis had earlier tried unsuccessfully to establish a church in Red Mountain Town. The day after the Guston church opened, the commercial district of Red Mountain Town was destroyed in a fire, with some local residents suggesting it was the result of "divine intervention". Between 1941 and 1945, the by-then abandoned Guston church had begun to tilt heavily, eventually collapsing.

The Panic of 1893 and the related cratering of silver's value saw the abandonment of most of Guston's mines by 1898, though the Idarado Mine continued producing gold and zinc into the 1960s. The Silverton Railroad closed in its entirety in 1926.

In 2014, the Ridgway Railroad Museum in Ridgway, Colorado, sponsored the reconstruction of the Guston railroad depot.

== See also ==
- List of ghost towns in Colorado
