= Silverton Railway =

Silverton Railway may refer to:

- Silverton Railroad in Colorado, United States
- Silverton Tramway in New South Wales, Australia
