= John Henry Slattery =

American politician (died 1933)

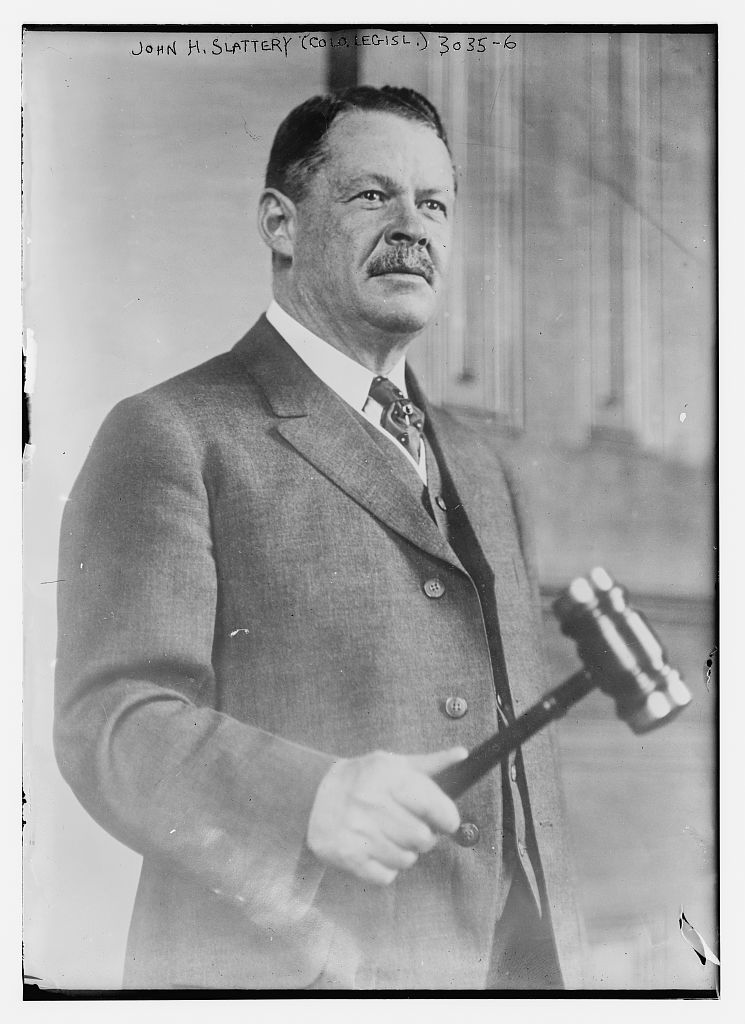
- Portrait of Slattery in 1914

Member of the Colorado Senate from the San Juan County district
- In office 1919–1921

Speaker of the Colorado State House of Representatives
- In office 1914–1915
- Preceded by: Onias C. Skinner
- Succeeded by: Philip B. Stewart

Member of the Colorado House of Representatives from the San Juan County district
- In office 1911–1914

Personal details
- Born: Malone, New York, U.S.
- Died: October 16, 1933 (aged 73) Los Angeles, California, U.S.
- Party: Democratic
- Children: 1
- Occupation: Politician; businessman; saloonkeeper

John Henry Slattery (died October 16, 1933) was an American politician from Colorado. He served in the Colorado State House of Representatives from 1911 to 1914, and he was speaker of the Colorado House in 1914. He later served in the Colorado Senate.

== Early life ==
John Henry Slattery was born in Malone, New York. He lived in Bingham Canyon, Utah, for a time. He settled in San Juan County, Colorado, around 1887.

== Career ==
Slattery served as mayor and councilman of Ironton. He later owned a saloon and gambling house in Silverton. He became manager of the Iowa-Tiger and Inter Section Leasing Company. He was one of the founders of the Silverton National Bank. In 1913, in association with the Silverton Railway Company and the American Smelting and Refining Company, he took out a five-year lease on the Silver Lake Mine in Silverton. He also operated the Gold King Mine in Silverton for four years with Otto Mears until 1918 when it was sold.

Slatter was a Democrat. He served in the Colorado State House of Representatives from 1911 to 1914. He was named speaker of the Colorado General Assembly in 1914. He served as a member of the Colorado Senate in 1919 and served two terms.

== Personal life ==
His daughter was Marguerite. In 1913, he lived in Ouray County. He also lived in Durango, Ironton and Silverton.

Slattery died following an operation following an intestinal ailment he received on a vacation in Oregon. He died on October 16, 1933, aged 73, at Cedars of Lebanon Hospital in Los Angeles. He was buried in Calvary Cemetery in Los Angeles.
