= Ironton, Colorado =

Ghost town in Ouray County, Colorado

Ironton
- Mining ghost town
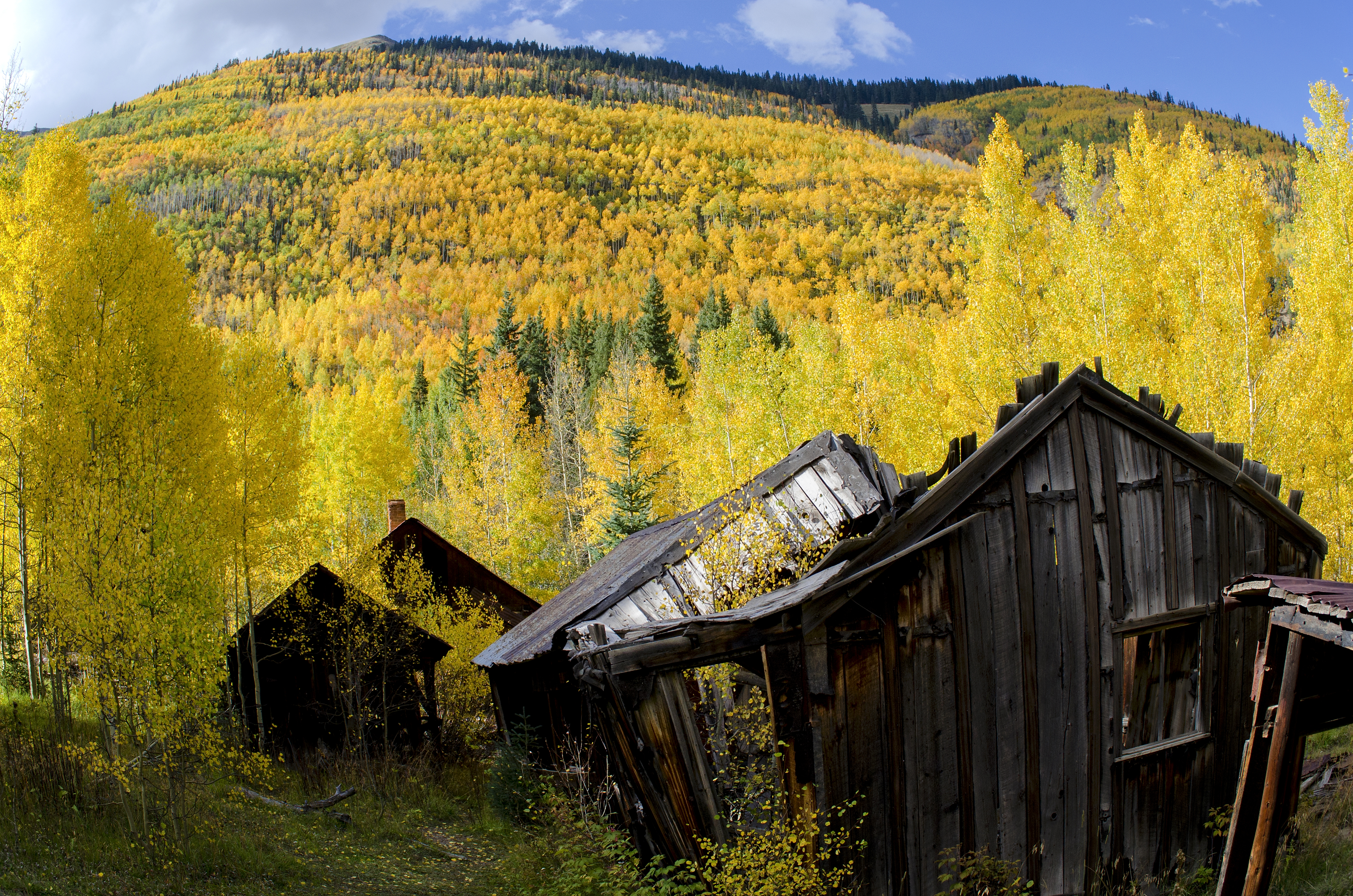
- Ironton Ghost Town in 2014

- Location within the state of Colorado
- Coordinates: 37°54′59″N 107°41′25″W
- Country: United States
- State: Colorado
- County: Ouray
- Elevation: 9,800 ft (3,000 m)

Population (2010)
  - Total: 0
- Time zone: UTC-7 (Mountain (MST))
  - Summer (DST): UTC-6 (MDT)
- ZIP codes: 81432
- GNIS feature ID: 187227

Ironton is an extinct town located in Ouray County, Colorado, United States. It lay south of the present town of Ouray, adjacent to the sites Guston and Red Mountain Town, fellow ghost towns. During the 1880s and 1890s, Ironton formed part of the Red Mountain Pass mining district, the second largest silver mining district in Colorado. The Ironton post office operated from May 2, 1883, until August 2, 1920.

== History ==
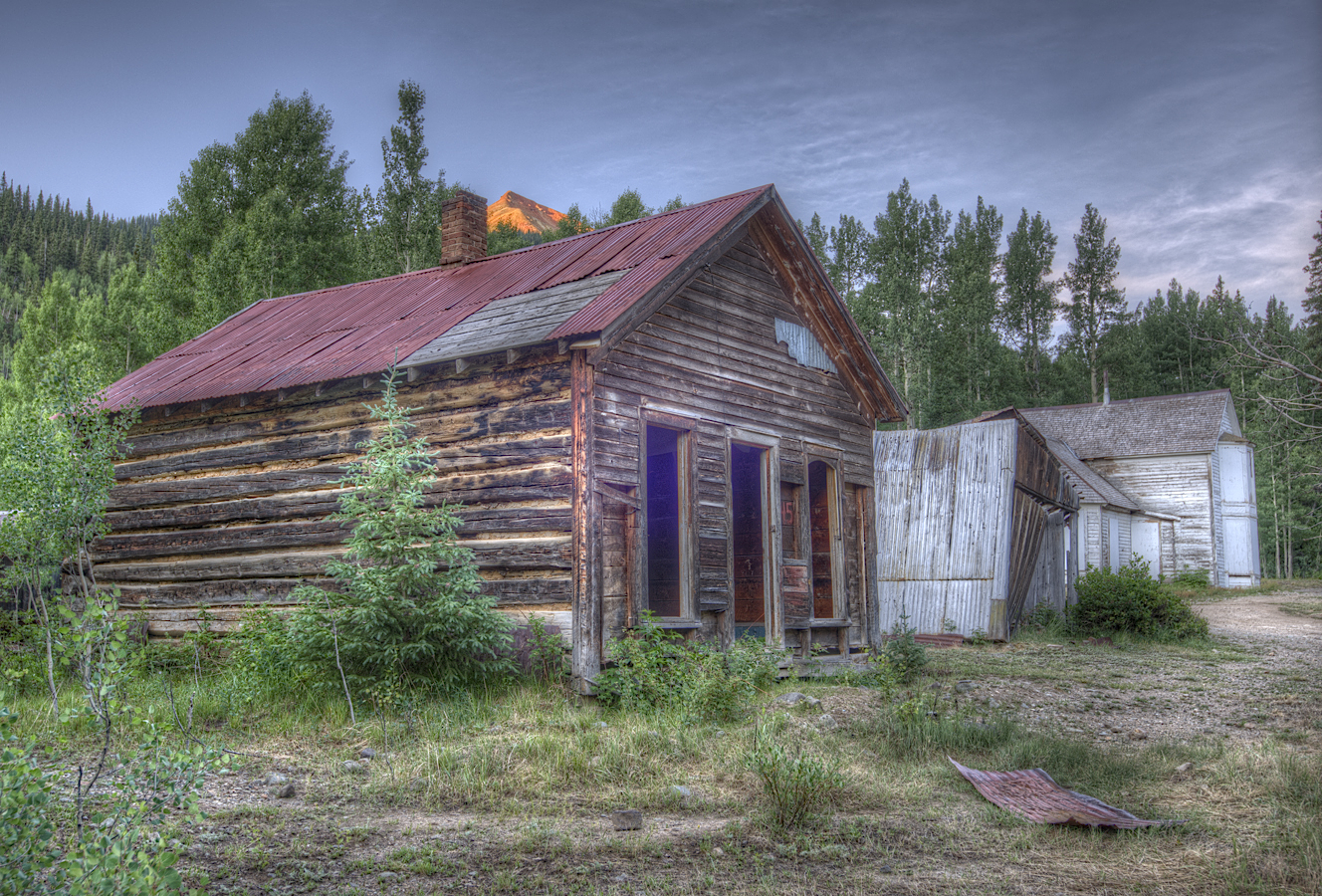
Ironton, Colorado, July 2012

Ironton (also formerly named "Copper Glen") was built on flatter ground than surrounding towns. Settled sporadically through the 1870s and 1880s, a major period of settlement that solidified Ironton as a community saw roughly 300 structures begin construction during a three-week span. It was a staging area for supplies coming from Ouray. Ironton was a major transportation junction between Red Mountain Town and Ouray in addition to having some of its own mines. Ironton had a peak population of over 1000 and had two trains arriving daily from Silverton. There were many chain stores from the nearby cities of Ouray and Silverton on the Silverton Railroad. This narrow gauge railroad backed by noted financier Otto Mears reached Ironton in 1889. Mears would later introduce toll roads to the area, resulting in the "Million Dollar Highway." The town lived into the first part of the 20th century but slowly faded as mining operations declined. The final resident of the town, Milton Larson, appeared as a contestant on the July 1, 1963, episode of I've Got A Secret, with this as his secret. He died in the mid-1960s. The town site is still occasionally visited by tourists.

== Notable people ==
- John Henry Slattery (died 1933), Colorado politician and mayor of Ironton

== See also ==
- List of ghost towns in Colorado
