= Silverton Northern Railroad =

Narrow gauge railroad in Colorado

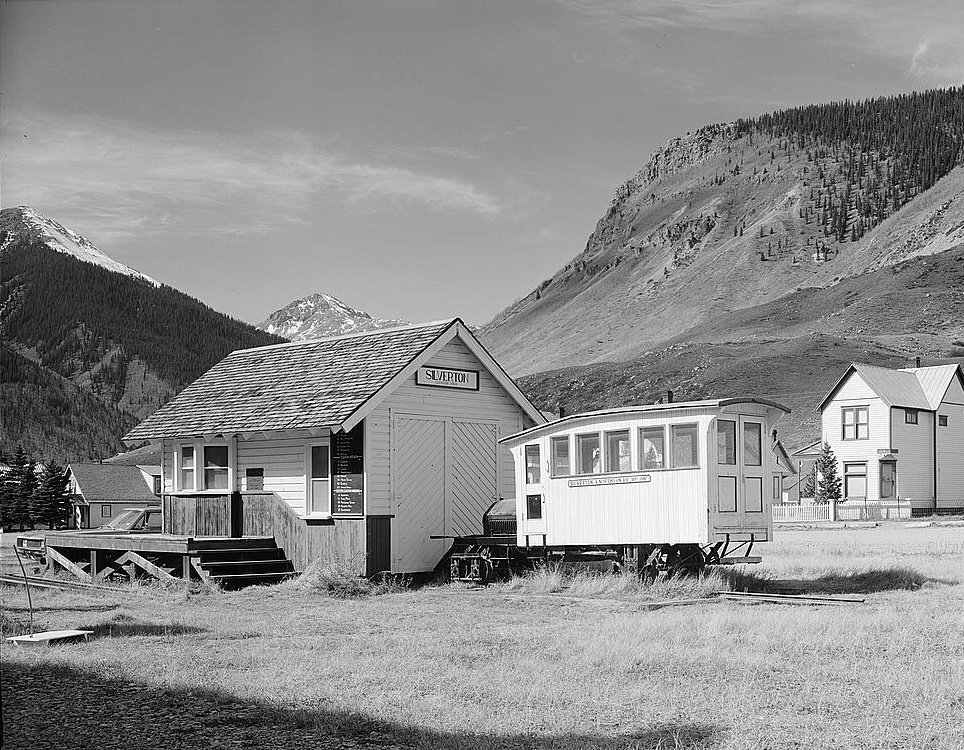
Silverton Northern railcar

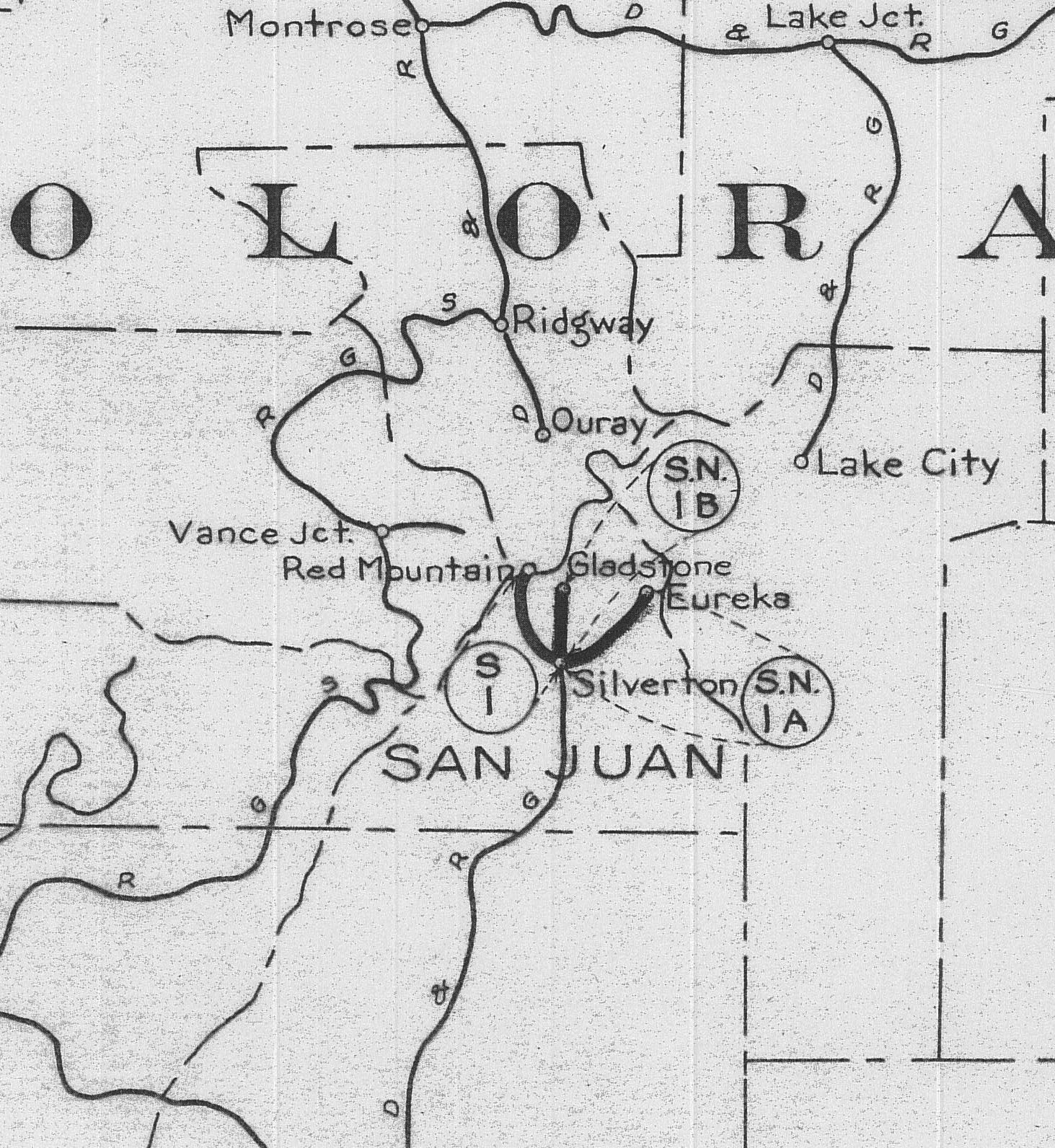
1916 map of the railroad

The Silverton Northern Railroad, now defunct, was an American 3 ft (914 mm) Narrow Gauge Railroad constructed to reach the mining area north of Silverton, Colorado along the upper Animas River. This line was the third railroad project built by known Colorado toll road builder and Russian Immigrant Otto Mears, beginning in 1889 as a branch of the Silverton Railroad to Eureka. Incorporated in 1895 as the Silverton Northern Railroad, the line was projected to run past Eureka to Animas Forks and on to Mineral Point and then on to Lake City via Henson Creek, including a proposed three-quarter-mile tunnel through the mountains. However, Animas Forks was the end of the line, which was reached in 1896.

Operations on the line were seasonal, due to the tremendous amount of snowfall that was typical in the San Juan region. The Silverton Railroad and the Silverton Northern while never officially merged, were operated as one entity, sharing rolling stock and motive power. In 1915, the Silverton, Gladstone and Northerly Railroad built by the Gold King Mine, was purchased by Mears, becoming the SN's Gladstone Branch.

The railroad managed to survive bad weather and fluctuating metals markets for years, the Silverton Railroad being dismantled in 1926 after several years of inactivity, and the main line was cut back from Animas Forks to Eureka in the late 1930s. Finally, in 1942, while the mines were idle and US involvement in World War II was increasing, the remaining SN equipment was requisitioned by the US Army for use on the White Pass and Yukon Route during the hurried construction of the Alaska Highway, and the rails were torn up for scrap.

The San Juan County Historical Society is planning on rebuilding the section between Silverton and Howardsville.

== Roster ==
Steam Locomotives
Number	Builder	Type	Serial number	Built	Acquired	Retired	Disposition/Notes
1	Baldwin Locomotive Works	2-8-0	5226	1887	1896	1920	Originally Denver and Rio Grande #79. Sold to the Rio Grande Southern Railroad in 1891 and became #24. Traded to the Silverton Railroad for Shay #269 and became SRR #101. Transferred to the Silverton Northern in 1896 and became #1. Scrapped in 1920.
3	Baldwin Locomotive Works	2-8-0	24109	1904	1904	8/1942	Sold to the White Pass and Yukon Route and became #22. It was returned to Auburn, Washington in 1944 and scrapped in 1945.
4	Baldwin Locomotive Works	2-8-0	27977	1906	1906	8/1942	Sold to the White Pass and Yukon Route and became #23. It was returned to Auburn, Washington in 1944 and scrapped in 1945.
34	Baldwin Locomotive Works	2-8-0	24130	1904	1915	8/1942	Originally Silverton, Gladstone and Northerly Railroad #34. Sold to the SN in 1915. Sold to the White Pass and Yukon Railroad in 1943 and became #24. Scrapped in 1951.

Motor Cars
Number/Name	Builder	Build Date	Notes
1	Strover	1908	Built by Stover. Dismantled around 1940.
Casey Jones	Home Built	1904	Built at the Sunnyside Shops at Eureka, Colorado. Original purpose was an ambulance. Preserved in Silverton. Not Silverton Northern.

Cabooses
Number	Builder	Build Date	Notes
#1005	Home Built by D&RG	1880	Originally Denver and Rio Grande caboose #17. Sold to the Silverton Railroad in 1895 and retained the same number. Transferred to the Silverton Northern at an unknown date and became #1005. Retired at an unknown date and put on display as Silverton, Gladstone, and Northerly #100, only to later be converted to a shed in Silverton. The caboose underwent an extensive restoration in 2014 and is now currently on display.
N/A	Unknown	Unknown	Originally Denver and Rio Grande Western Railroad #0556. It was sold to the Silverton Northern in 1937 and referred as the Silverton Northern Caboose on 1937. It was not numbered by the SN. It was sold to the White Pass and Yukon Route in 1943 and became #90853. It was wrecked the same year and later converted into a car inspector shack. It was burned in 1958.

Passenger Cars
Number/Name	Builder	Build Date	Notes
Combine #2	American Car and Foundry	1905	Originally Silverton, Gladstone, and Northerly #2. It was transferred to the Silverton Northern when the SN purchased the SG&N. Its current fate is unknown, though it more than likely that the car does not exist anymore.
Chair Car #4	Jackson and Sharp Company	1882	Originally Denver and Rio Grande #90. It was renumbered to #314 in July 1885. It was sold to the Silverton Northern in January 1909 and became #4. It was retired around 1938 and converted to a car body. The car body was moved to Durango, Colorado in the 1940s and became part of the Chief Pioneer Diner. When the diner closed in 1981, the car was moved to private property near Junction Creek, northwest of Durango. It was later moved to private property in Breen, Colorado where it supposedly remains today.
Buffet-Sleeper "Animas Forks"	Pullman Company	1883	Originally Denver and Rio Grande (number unknown). It was bought by the Silverton Northern around 1905 or 1906. The car was too big for the Silverton Northern's sharp curves and was wrecked in 1911. The car was boarded up and remained in storage near the D&RG roundhouse in Silverton. In 1920, Otto Mears ordered that it, along with a number of badly damaged cars, be burned south of Silverton. The metal remains were salvaged.
