= Idarado Mine =

Mining operation in Colorado, U.S.

Coordinates: 37°54′54.40″N 107°42′1.1″W

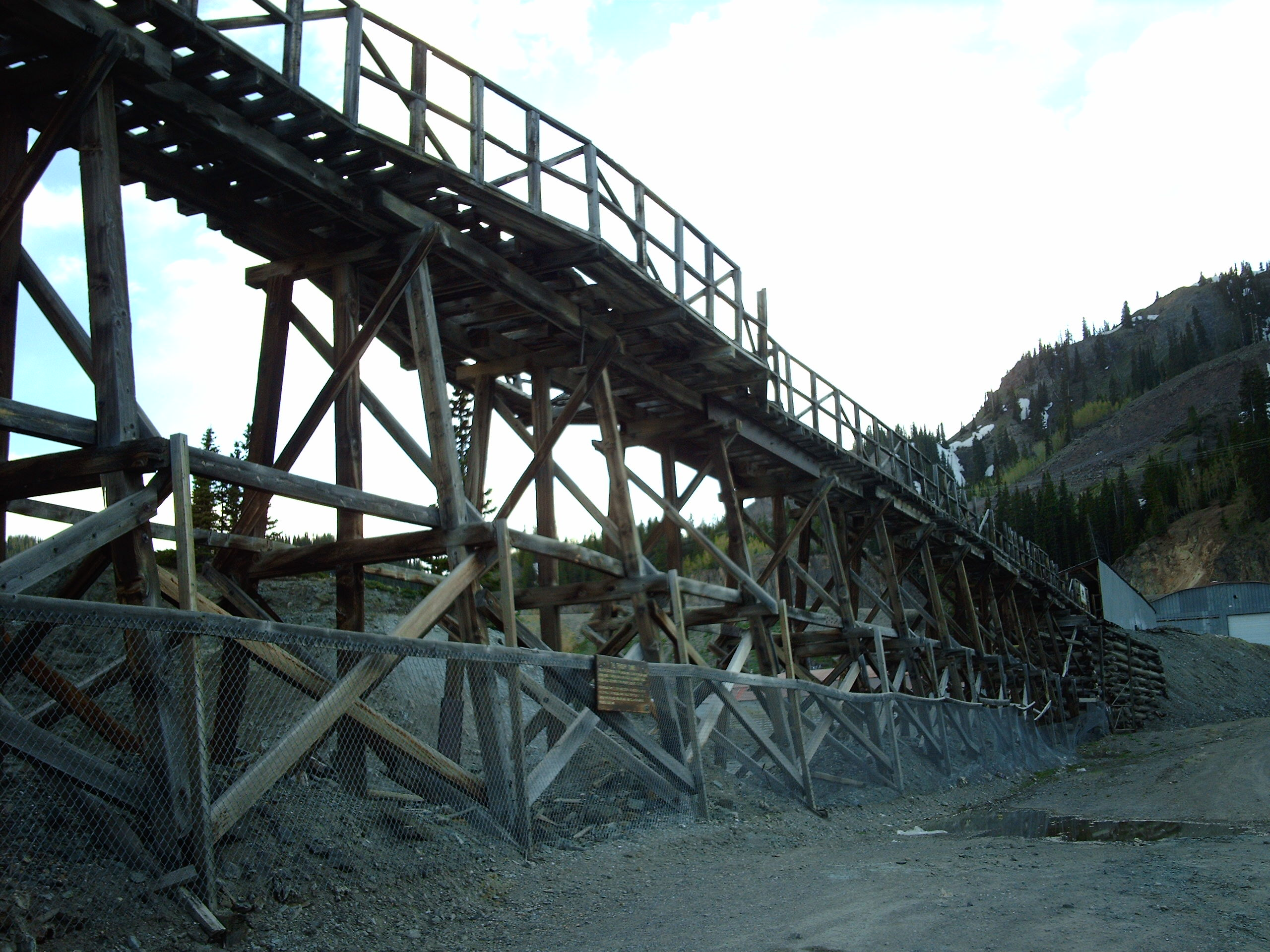
Idarado Mine trestle

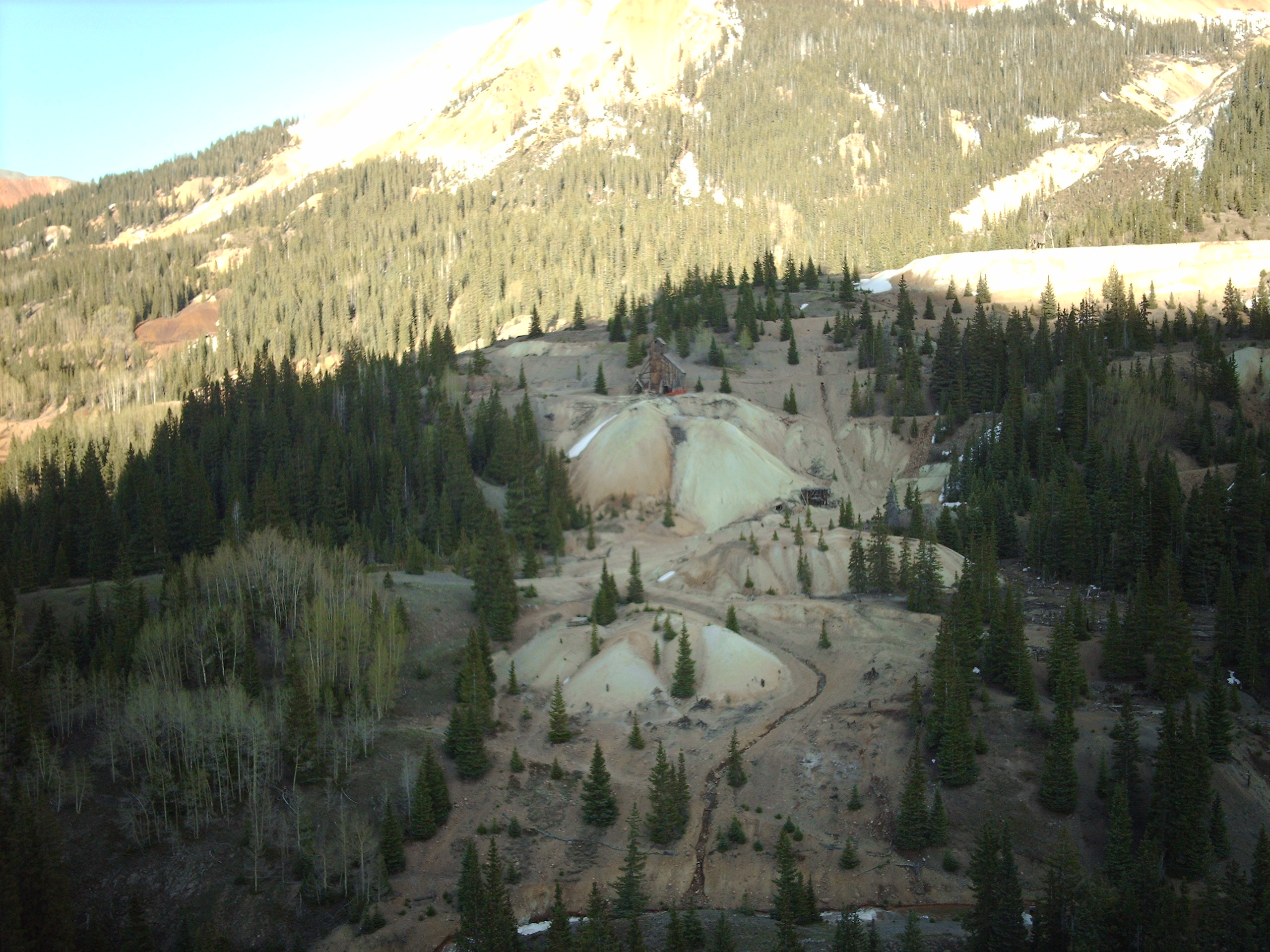
Mine waste, below the Yankee Girl mine on Red Mountain No. 2 near Guston.

The Idarado Mine was a mining operation in the San Juan Mountains of Ouray County, Colorado near the now-ghost town of Guston, producing primarily lead, zinc and silver along with small amounts of gold and copper. The mine is within the Sneffels-Red Mountain-Telluride mining district. The mine was a consolidation of several previously inactive mines interconnected via the Treasury Tunnel.

The remains of the operation are visible from the Million Dollar Highway, north of Red Mountain Pass, between Ouray and Silverton, Colorado. The tunnels of the Idarado extend some 5 miles (8 km) west under 13,000 foot (4,000 m) mountains to the Pandora Mill near Telluride, a trip of more than 60 miles (100 km) by highway.

== Hammond's early venture ==
The "Treasury Tunnel Mining and Reduction Company" was created in 1896 by mine developer William Hammond Jr., with the hope of exploiting ore deposits thought to exist between the mines of Red Mountain and Telluride. Hammond believed a parallel vein structure existed and he drove the Treasury Tunnel approximately 2000 feet into the mountain in the belief he'd intercept the vein. Hammond's venture did find some ore, but he never struck it rich.

The tunnel operated for about 10 years with limited success before being abandoned.

== Newport mining operations ==
=== World War II ===
In 1939, mining giant Newmont Mining began exploration in the San Juans, looking for sources of base metals to assist America's allies in Europe, already embroiled in the opening months of WW2. Newmont's lead exploration geologist/executive, Fred Searls, recommended utilizing the old Treasury Tunnel, extending it to intercept the Barstow and the Black Bear Mines. Searls recognized the Barstow and Black Bear still possessed large reserves of lead and zinc beneath their historic workings, which the previous mine owners had not exploited as it was uneconomical.

At Searls direction, Newmont began buying outright, or leasing, most of the old mining claims in the area. He convinced another mining company, the Sunshine Mining Company from Wallace, Idaho to form a joint venture. Development of their new mine was now up and running. They named it "Idarado Mining Company" to reflect the partnership of both companies.

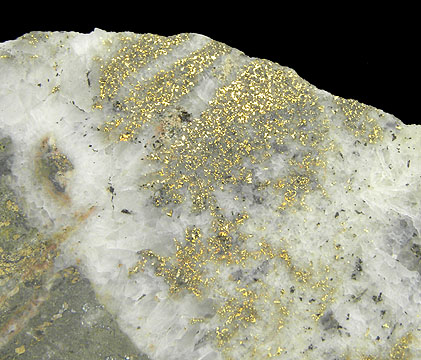
Gold in quartz and sphalerite, detail of historic slabbed ore specimen from the Idarado Mine, collected in 1927.

Big changes were soon in store for Idarado. After the start of America's involvement in WW2, the nation needed lead, zinc and copper - strategic metals needed for the war effort. In 1942, the War Production Board Order L-208, went into effect, shutting down gold mines to reallocate the resources and manpower that gold mining was consuming. Shortly thereafter, the War Production Board created the Domestic Metals Procurement Program in 1943 to financially assist mine owners with developing base metal mines as quickly as possible. The Idarado mine was a perfect candidate for federal assistance. In June 1943, the US Federal Government, leased the Idarado and paid to have the Treasury Tunnel extended the additional 7000 feet to come in beneath the old Black Bear workings.

Once the Treasury Tunnel was under the Black Bear, miners created a 600 feet vertical raise to intersect and drain the old workings. A great deal of infrastructure was needed before the mine could go into production though. Miners build ore shoots, laid rail, strung electrical and ventilation, drifted on the ore body in preparation for stopping the veins. By the time the mine was ready to produce, WW2 was in its final year.

=== War's end ===
In June 1944, Newmont bought back the lease on Idarado from the federal government, repaying the cost of the Treasury extension. The mine was ready to produce, but needed a concentration mill. A new, 250 ton-per-day selective flotation mill was built and by January 1945 the mine was in full swing. Mill tailings were slurried out, flowing across a tailings suspension bridge across the gulch and creek, depositing them farther down the valley near the townsite of Ironton. Concentrates from the mill were trucked north to Montrose, where they were shipped by rail to the smelter.

Newmont Mining, finally seeing profits from the mine coming in, bought out Sunshine Mining's stake in Idarado, becoming the sole owner.

=== Purchase of Telluride holdings ===
On the Telluride side of the mountain, another company, Telluride Mines Inc., had been developing its own properties. Telluride Mines owned the fabled Smuggler-Union mine and mill, which had been one of the top gold producers in the mining district in previous years. Telluride Mines had driven a tunnel at mill-level, into the mountain and created raises to connect with the Smuggler-Union workings, along with others. Telluride Mines controlled most of the other historic producers as well, including the Liberty Bell, Tomboy, Ajax, Argentine and Montana.

In 1953 metal prices took a dive. Telluride mines was financially weak and unable to remain open given the low metal prices. They announced their impending closing in April 1953, a move that would lay off all 230 workers. Just before Telluride Mines proposed closing date, Newmont Mining announced they had purchased all of Telluride Mine's holdings. The miners of Telluride were saved.

=== 1953 - 1975 ===
Once Newmont had control of all the other major mines working on the same vein structure, they were able to extend their workings from under the Black Bear and connect with the raises Telluride Mines had already created. Once completed, miners could pass all the way through the mountain from Red Mountain to Telluride.

Newmont's engineers recognized the old Smuggler-Union mill, also known as the Pandora Mill, which they acquired from Telluride Mines was in a better location than their Treasury Mill on Red Mountain pass. The Treasury mill was difficult and expensive to operate, given its remote location. They decided to rehab the old Pandora mill and close the Treasury mill. In 1956, the Pandora mill was refitted with new equipment and put into service. Their timing was fortunate as the Treasury Mill burned down shortly thereafter.

After further underground development of several ore passes, ore produced could be trammed towards Telluride and dumped down the nearest ore pass, dropping by gravity to the mill level tunnel where it was loaded and hauled the short distance to the Pandora Mill.

By 1959, Idarado was producing 400,000 tons of ore annually. In 1965, the mine produced 389,000 tons. Idarado operated profitably until 1971, when the combination of low metal prices, a strike at the smelters, and a labor shortage in Telluride caused it to be unable to turn a profit. Things rebounded, and by 1973, Idarado had struck a new ore body which helped make the mine profitable again. 1973-1974 was again a boom time for the mine. Idarado was hiring anyone willing to work. The mine was running around the clock, blasting through 80,000 pounds of dynamite per week.

1974 saw their best financials yet, with a reported $21,000,000 in sales. With over 500 employees, Idarado was now the second biggest mine in Colorado behind Climax Molybdenum, near Leadville. 1975 was Idarado's best year, and the last year it operated profitably.

== Decline ==
The two smelters that reduced their ores, one in Leadville, and the other in Corpus Cristi, both closed. Idarado had to send their ores out of the country to be smelted, at an exorbitant cost. The cost of smelting was just one problem. The rich ore body they had struck in 1973 was now exhausted, and miners were forced to produce low value ores from farthest edges of the ore body, far away from the mill.

Eventually, Idarado succumbed to the financial hemorrhage, and closed their doors for good in 1978 on September 30.

Beginning in the 1980s, reclamation efforts took place at the mill-tailings ponds near the mine and farther north down the valley, near the old Ironton town site. The old tailings ponds can still be seen just off the highway, appearing now as flat, grassy meadows. The same flat mill tailings piles seen near the Pandora mill stand as evidence of 100 years of mining and milling in Telluride.

In 1987, the owners of the defunct mine were fined a record $69,000 by the Environmental Protection Authority for toxic leaks. In 1998, the state was embarking on a $20 million dollar project to clean up the site.

== Bibliography ==
- "Mountains of Silver: Life in Colorado's Red Mountain Mining District" - P. David Smith
- "Miles of Tunnels. A Brief History of the Idarado Mine" - Samantha Tisdel Wright. Published in the Telluride Daily Planet
