= Silverton Railroad =

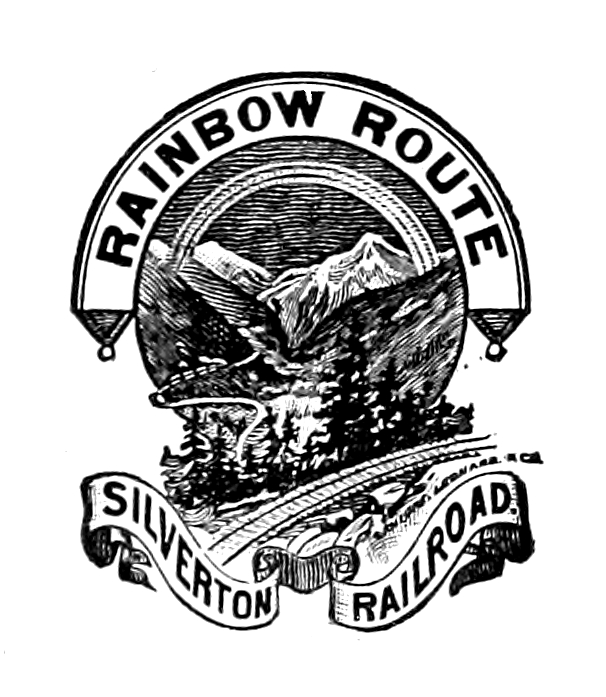

Overview
- Other name: The Rainbow Route
- Status: Defunct
- Owner: Otto Mears
- Locale: Colorado
- Termini: Silverton, Colorado; Albany, Colorado

History
- Opened: 28 January 1888
- Closed: 1926

Technical
- Line length: 21.5 mi (34.6 km)
- Character: 3-foot narrow-gauge mountain mining railroad
- Track gauge: 3 ft (914 mm)
- Minimum radius: 30-degree (194-foot radius)
- Highest elevation: 11,111 ft (3,387 m)
Route map
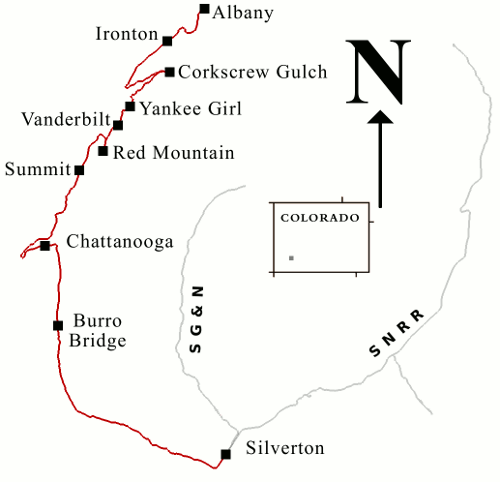

The Silverton Railroad, now defunct, was an American 3 ft (914 mm) narrow gauge railroad constructed between Silverton, Colorado and mining districts near Red Mountain Pass, Colorado.

The Silverton Railroad is remembered for the innovative solutions to difficult engineering problems presented by the steep, mountainous terrain which were devised by the railroad's chief locating engineer, Charles Wingate Gibbs – the Chattanooga Loop, the depot in a wye at Red Mountain, and a covered turntable on the main track at Corkscrew Gulch – and for the unusual and expensive annual passes presented by the owner, Otto Mears.

- Chattanooga Loop – Gibbs achieved a 550-foot rise in the line over a quarter-mile straight-line distance by a detour from Mineral Creek up Mill Creek gulch, with in a 30-degree (194-foot radius) curve looping 200 degrees at the end, and returning to Mineral Creek, all on a 5-percent grade.
- Red Mountain Wye – extremely limited level space and hard rock at Red Mountain Town towards Guston, precluding a balloon loop or turntable for turning trains, led Gibbs to plan a wye with short arms able to accommodate only a locomotive and two cars, and to place the station house on the only remaining flat area, in the center of the wye.
- Corkscrew Gulch Turntable – to solve the operational difficulties presented by the switchback at Corkscrew Gulch, Gibbs placed a turntable on the main track at the junction of the lower and upper arms of the switchback, allowing the locomotive to work downgrade of ore cars for safety and efficiency. The 50-foot turntable was big enough only for the locomotive, and the cars were fed through by gravity in both directions. The turntable was covered with a snowshed to allow operations as deep into winter as possible.
- Railroad Passes of Otto Mears – Railroads until 1906 commonly issued free printed paper or card travel passes to such people as employees, their families, shippers, clergymen, politicians, judges and others whose influence was sought in the railroads' favor. Mears wanted to make the passes issued by his railroads special. The passes for the Silverton Railroad in 1888 were printed on buckskin, in 1889 were of stamped silver, and the 1890 passes were watch fobs. None were issued in 1891, but the 1892 passes good on both Mear's Silverton and Rio Grande Southern Railroads were of silver filigree, and three were made of gold.

The Silverton Railroad was the first of several railroad projects by Otto Mears, the famed "Pathfinder of the San Juans". Construction of the line began in 1887 and reached Burro Bridge by early November, when work was halted for the winter. The route followed a survey made by the Denver & Rio Grande up Mineral Creek to climb Red Mountain Pass to reach the incredibly rich mining district around Red Mountain Town. Construction resumed and service began the following year, and the line reached Ironton in November. The line reached its greatest extent in September 1889 with the completion from Ironton of a spur to a mill at Albany.

In 1889, surveying and grading was begun on a branch up the upper Animas River to Eureka. This project became the beginning on the Silverton Northern Railroad.

A line was proposed to connect Ironton with Ouray in 1892 which would have been electric-powered and used a rack-and-pinion system to overcome the steep grades of 7%, but the Silver Crash of 1893 prevented further construction. The railroad struggled through market and weather difficulties, was ordered into receivership in 1898 and was sold under foreclosure in 1904. It was reorganized as the Silverton Railroad Company, but was never very successful, and was finally dismantled in 1926.

== Locomotives ==
Number	Builder	Type	Serial number	Built	Acquired	Retired	Disposition/Notes
100	Baldwin Locomotive Works	2-8-0		1887	1887	1896	Made from the running gear of Denver & Rio Grande #42 and #283's boiler. Transferred to Silverton Northern #1 in 1896. Scrapped 1924.
101	Baldwin Locomotive Works	2-8-0	5226	1880	12/1892	Unknown	Built as Denver & Rio Grande #79. Sold to Rio Grande Southern #34 in 1890. Acquired in trade of 269 and became Silverton #101 in 1892.
269	Lima Locomotive Works	Class B Two Truck Shay	269	4/1890	4/1890	12/1892	Built for Silverton #269. Traded for Rio Grande Southern #34 (2-8-0) in 1892 and became Rio Grande Southern #34. See for history: https://www.shaylocomotives.com/data/searchdataframe.htm

See Links:

- http://www.drgw.net/info/SilvertonRailroad
