= Otto Mears =

Colorado pioneer, road builder and entrepreneur (1840 – 1931)

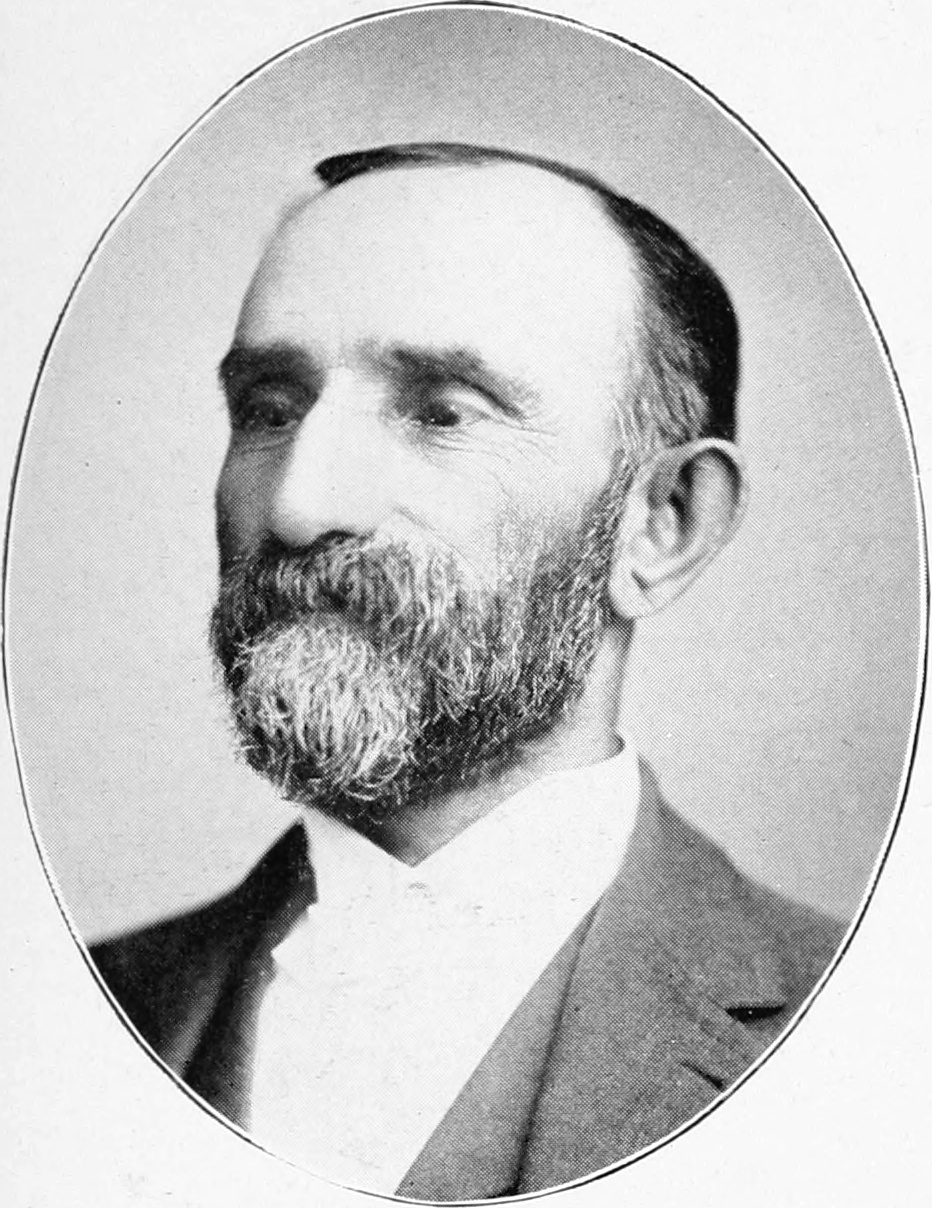
- Mears in 1902
- Born: May 3, 1840; Courland, Russian Empire
- Died: June 24, 1931 (aged 91); Pasadena, California, U.S.
- Resting place: Uncompahgre National Forest (scattered)
- Occupations: Railroad builder; entrepreneur; politician
- Years active: 1864–1931
- Political party: Republican
- Spouse: Mary Kampfshier
- Awards: Hall of Great Westerners (1964)

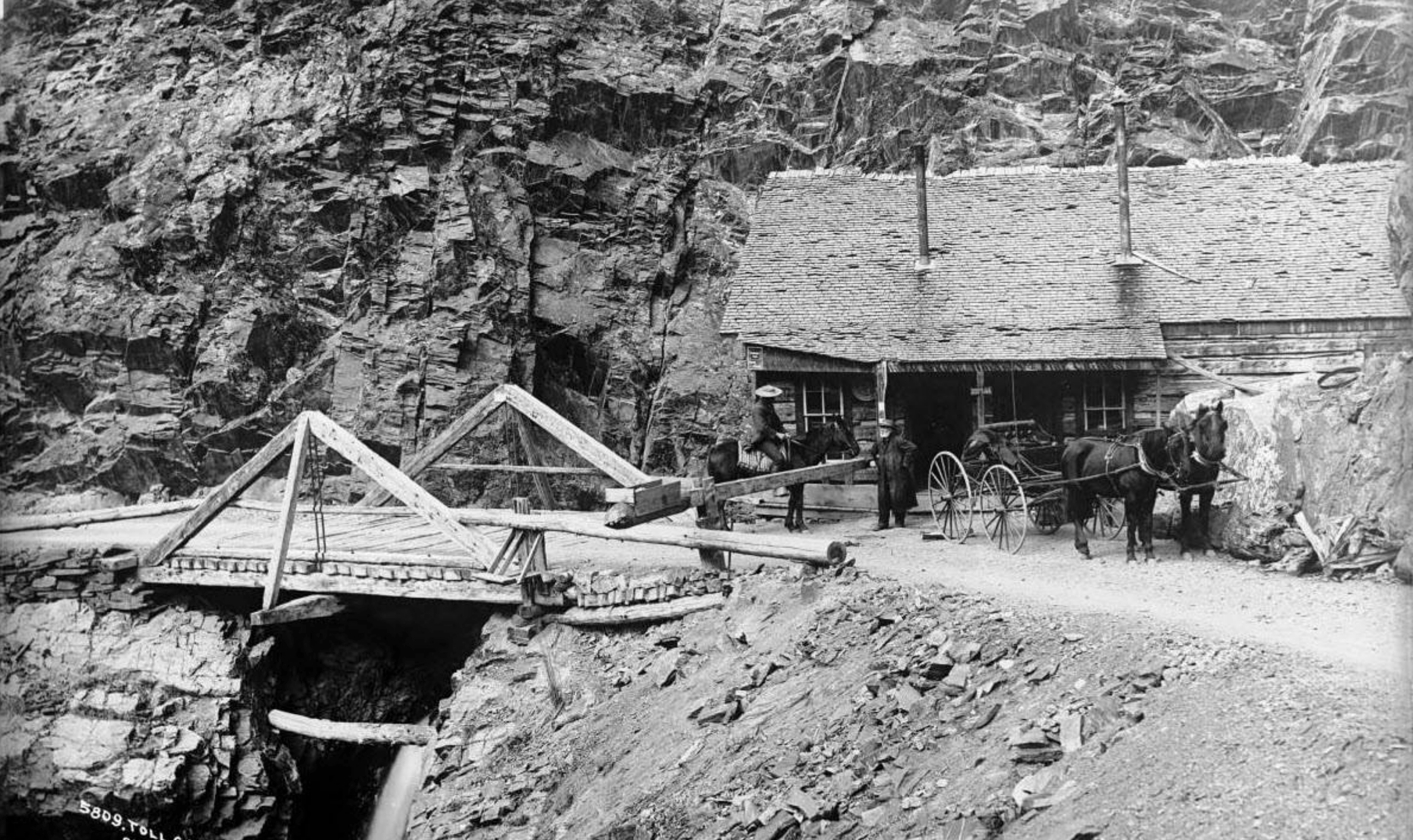
Toll road owned by Otto Mears between Ouray and Silverton, Colorado, 1880s

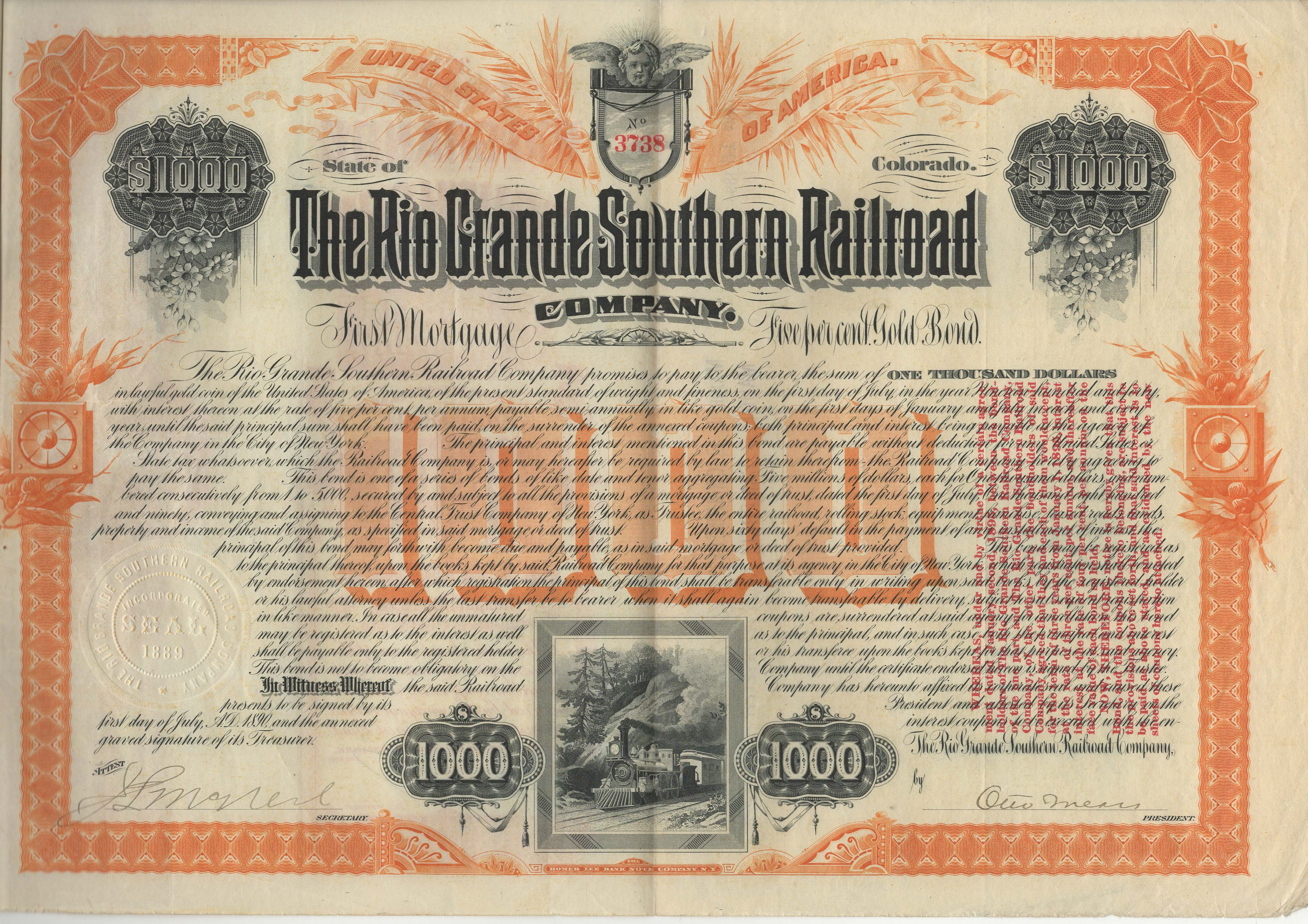
Gold Bond of the Rio Grande Southern Railroad, issued 1. July 1890, signed by President Otto Mears

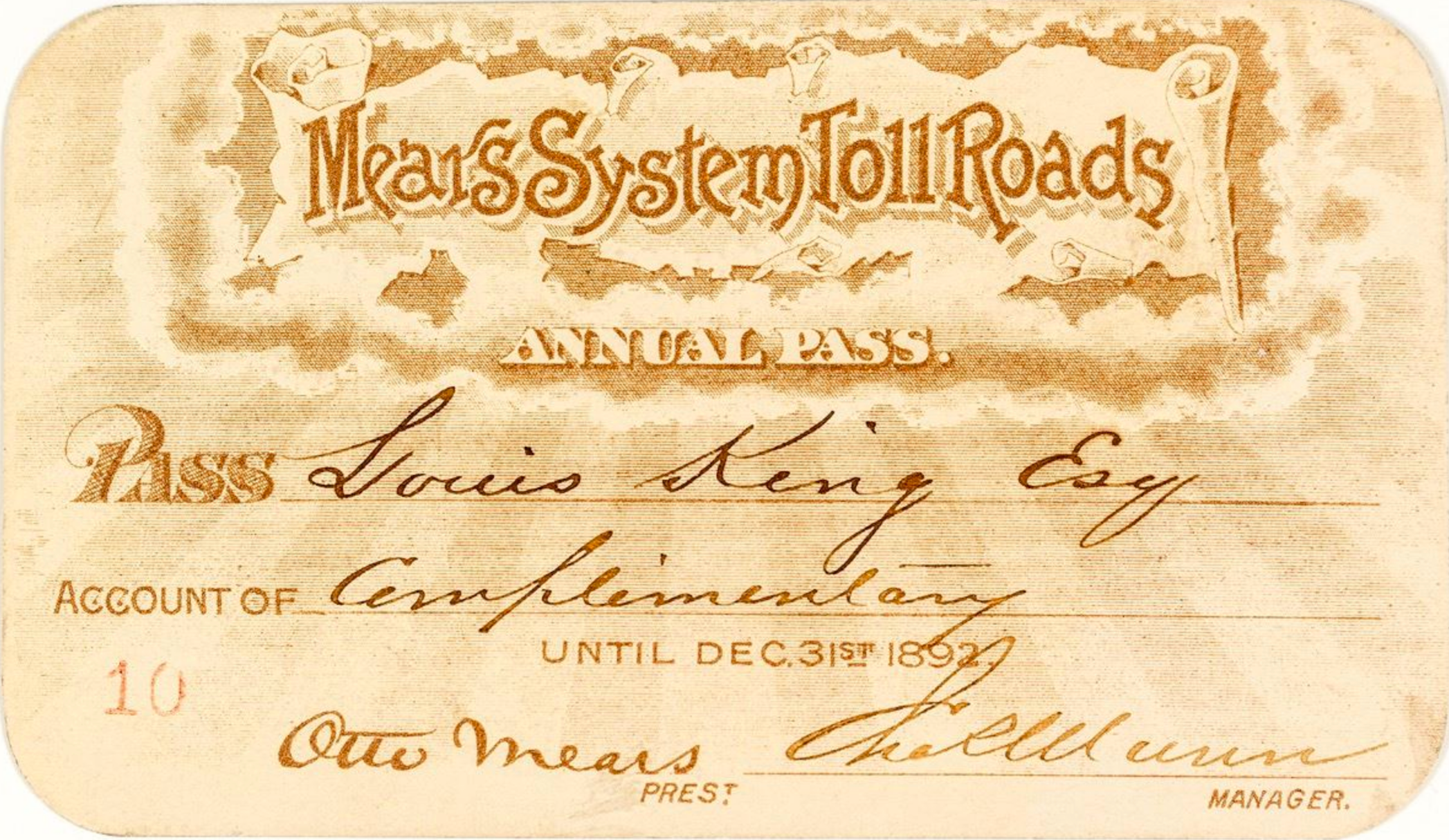
1892 pass to use the Mears system toll roads

Otto Mears (May 3, 1840 – June 24, 1931) was a Colorado railroad builder and entrepreneur who played a major role in the early development of southwestern Colorado.

Mears was known as the "Pathfinder of the San Juans" because of his road and railroad building projects through Colorado's San Juan Mountains in the late 19th century. He built hundreds of miles of toll roads in the rough terrain of the young state of Colorado, notably the Million Dollar Highway over Red Mountain Pass, connecting Silverton to Ouray.

== Early life ==
Mears was born on May 3, 1840, to an English-Jewish father and a Russian-Jewish mother from Courland, Latvia, then a possession of the Russian Empire. He was orphaned when he was less than four years old and was sent to live with an uncle, who soon sent him to live with another uncle in England, although Mears spoke no English. A year later, he was sent to live with a relative in New York City. Mears lived there until he was fifteen, when he was sent to live with an uncle in San Francisco; however, the man had recently decamped to Australia unbeknownst to Mears and his relatives. Mears arrived and found himself homeless, but he had befriended the owner of a local rooming house during the journey by ship from Panama, and she and her husband took him in. Mears continued trying to find his uncle, only to learn months later that the man had left the country before his arrival.

The San Francisco economy was booming due to the California Gold Rush, and Mears found work milking cows and serving as a clerk and a teamster. In 1859, Mears left the city to seek gold himself, working in Placerville, California, and the Comstock Lode in Virginia City, Nevada. Mears then served in the 1st California Infantry Regiment during the American Civil War, fighting a Navajo uprising under the leadership of Kit Carson. After mustering out in August 1864 in the Mesilla Valley in New Mexico, Mears moved to Santa Fe, where he first worked at the Elsberg & Amberg mercantile store as a clerk; impressed with the young man's work ethic, the owners of rival retailer Staab Brothers hired him as a manager.

== Career ==
Later Mears worked the gold fields of California before settling in Colorado, where he would make his name. He initially settled in Conejos County in Colorado Territory, but soon moved to Saguache, Colorado, then to the San Juans where, among other things, he served as interpreter, negotiator, and friend of the Ute Indians. In 1873, Mears was one of the negotiators that helped secure a deal with Chief Ouray, requiring his people to move away from the "Red Mountains" and resettle in a reservation in another part of the Colorado Territory.

A wheat farmer in Saguache, Mears first built a road over Poncha Pass to gain access to the flour mill at Nathrop, which served the Leadville market. Mears told a story many times in his life that his decision to become a road builder followed an encounter with William Gilpin, former Territorial Governor of Colorado, on Poncha Pass while struggling to bring his flour to market over the poorly built road. He applied to the Colorado legislature for toll road charters for his roads and built the roads in conformations and at grades suitable for railways. His routes over Poncha Pass and Marshall Pass were purchased for road beds by the Denver and Rio Grande railway.

Mears built several railroads during his 91 years, including the Rio Grande Southern Railroad from Durango to Ridgway, the Silverton Railroad, and the Silverton Northern Railroad. Several of his railroads were narrow gauge. From 1888 to 1892, Mears issued special railroad passes to dignitaries and friends to allow them to ride free on any of his lines. Some of these rare passes were made of silver or gold and are now highly prized collector's items. A Master List of all of the presently known Otto Mears unique passes for the Silverton Railroad and the Rio Grande Southern Railroad is on line at San Juan County Historical Society.org under "Mears Passes".

In 1876, the state legislature selected Mears as one of Colorado's three presidential electors supporting Republican Rutherford B. Hayes. In the 1880s, Mears was elected to the Colorado legislature. The panic of 1893 reduced the value of his investments. He had to sell much property and lost control of his railroad holdings.

Mears moved to the East Coast and became involved in railroad and manufacturing ventures there. One of his most successful railroads on the east coast was the Chesapeake Beach Railway, which ran between Washington DC and southern Maryland.

The dome of the Colorado State Capitol building was originally covered in copper. After the weather tarnished the copper sheathing, Mears suggested covering the dome with gold. He persuaded the Colorado Mining Association to donate 200 ounces of gold for the project, and by 1908, the dome's first gilding was complete.

Otto Mears died on June 24, 1931, in Pasadena, California.

In 1964, he was inducted into the Hall of Great Westerners of the National Cowboy & Western Heritage Museum.

Mears Peak in the San Juan Mountains is named after him, as is Mount Otto in the Sangre de Cristo Range.

== Works cited ==
- Baker, James H., ed. (1927). History of Colorado: Biographical. Vol. V. LeRoy R. Hafen, Assc. Ed.; State Historical and Natural History Society of Colorado. Denver, CO: Linderman Co.
- Ferrell, Mallory Hope (1973). Silver San Juan. Boulder, Colorado: Pruett Press, Inc. ISBN 0-87108-057-5.
- Hall, Frank (1895). History of the State of Colorado. Vol. IV. Chicago, IL: Blakely Printing Co.
- Hunt, Inez; Draper, Wanetta W. (1960). "Otto Mears, Little Man with the Giant Stride". To Colorado's Restless Ghosts. Denver, CO: Sage Books.
- Stone, Wilbur Fiske (1919). History of Colorado, Illustrated. Vol. IV. Chicago, IL: The S. J. Clarke publishing company.
- Strong, William K. (1988). The Remarkable Railroad Passes of Otto Mears. Silverton, CO: San Juan County Book Co. ISBN 0-9608000-6-9.
