= Gravel Mountain =

Mountain in the American state of Colorado

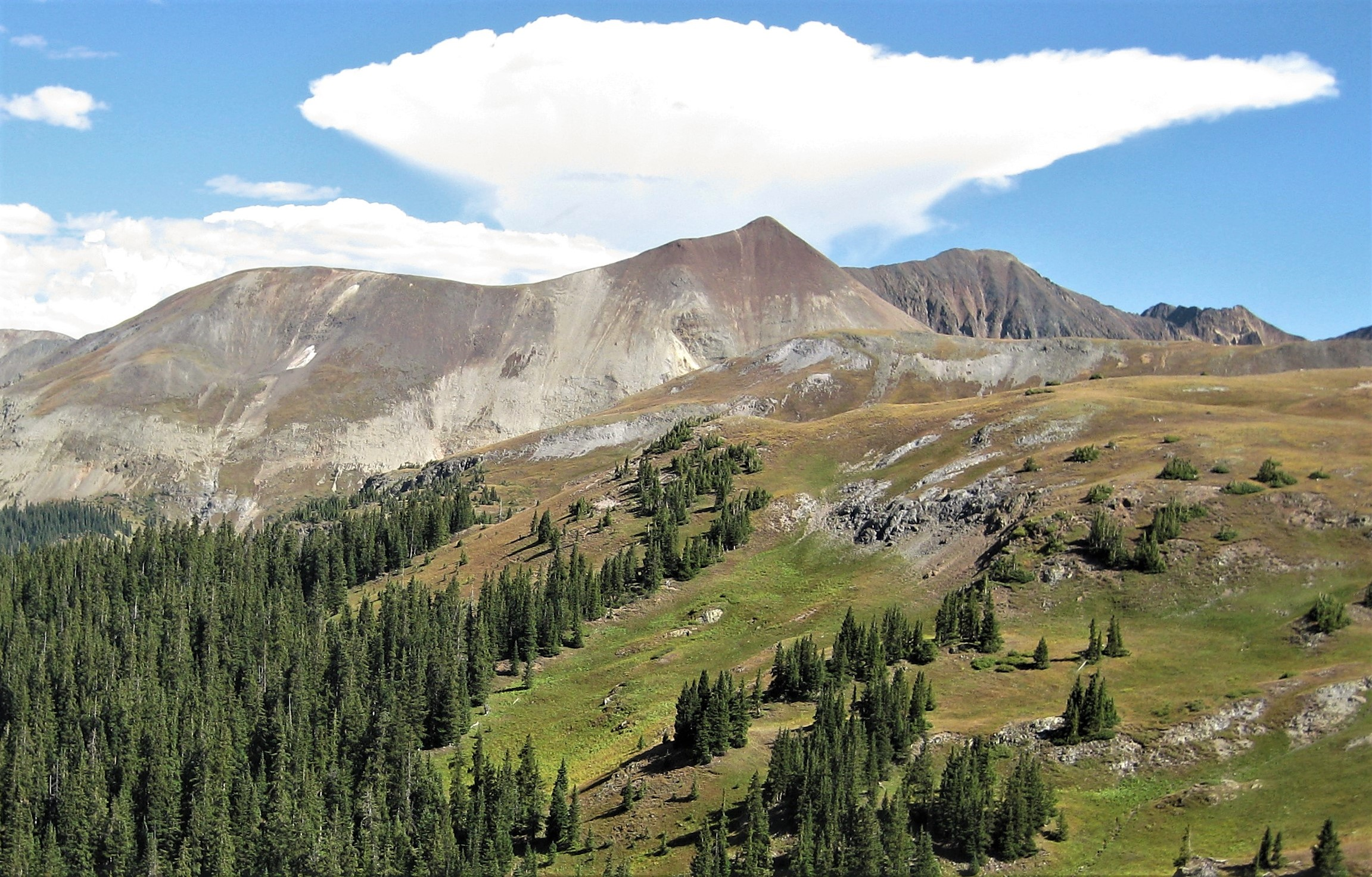
- Northwest aspect

Highest point
- Elevation: 13,596 ft (4,144 m)
- Prominence: 146 ft (45 m)
- Isolation: 0.39 mi (0.63 km)
- Coordinates: 37°57′35″N 107°32′28″W

Geography
- Location within Colorado Location within the United States
- Country: United States
- State: Colorado
- County: Hinsdale
- Parent range: Rocky Mountains; San Juan Mountains
- Topo map: USGS Handies Peak

Climbing
- Easiest route: class 2

Gravel Mountain is a 13,596-foot-elevation (4,144-meter) summit in Hinsdale County, Colorado, United States. It is located nine miles (14 km) southeast of the community of Ouray, on land administered by the Bureau of Land Management. It is situated eight miles (13 km) west of the Continental Divide in the San Juan Mountains which are a subrange of the Rocky Mountains. Precipitation runoff from the mountain drains into Henson Creek which is part of the Gunnison River watershed. Topographic relief is significant as the summit rises 2,800 feet (850 meters) above Henson Creek in approximately one mile (1.6 km). Access to the mountain is via the Alpine Loop Back Country Byway. The mountain's toponym has been officially adopted by the United States Board on Geographic Names, and has been recorded in publications since at least 1906.

== Climate ==
According to the Köppen climate classification system, Gravel Mountain is located in an alpine subarctic climate zone with cold, snowy winters, and cool to warm summers. Due to its altitude, it receives precipitation all year, as snow in winter, and as thunderstorms in summer, with a dry period in late spring.

== Gallery ==
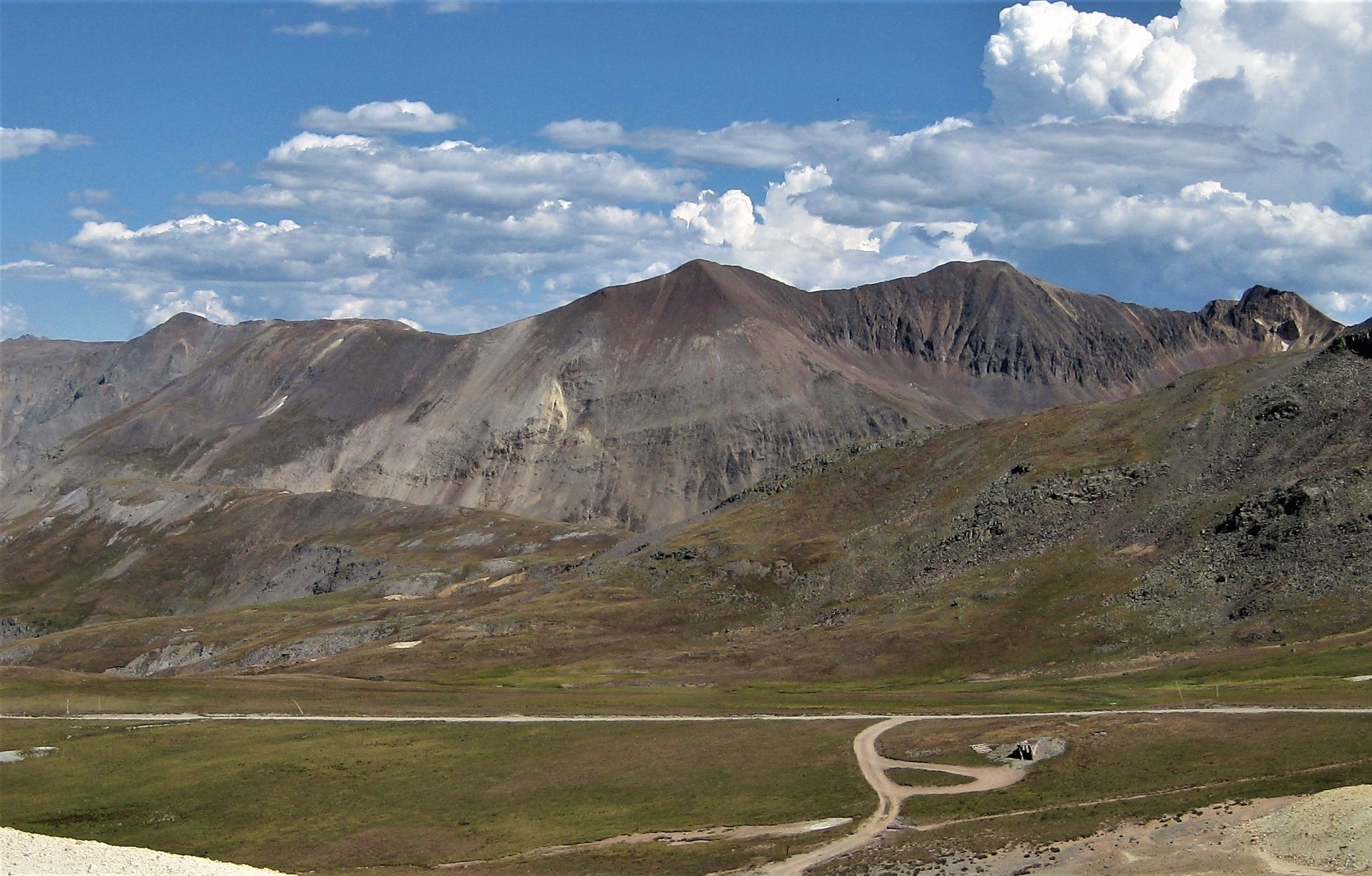
Gravel Mountain from Engineer Pass

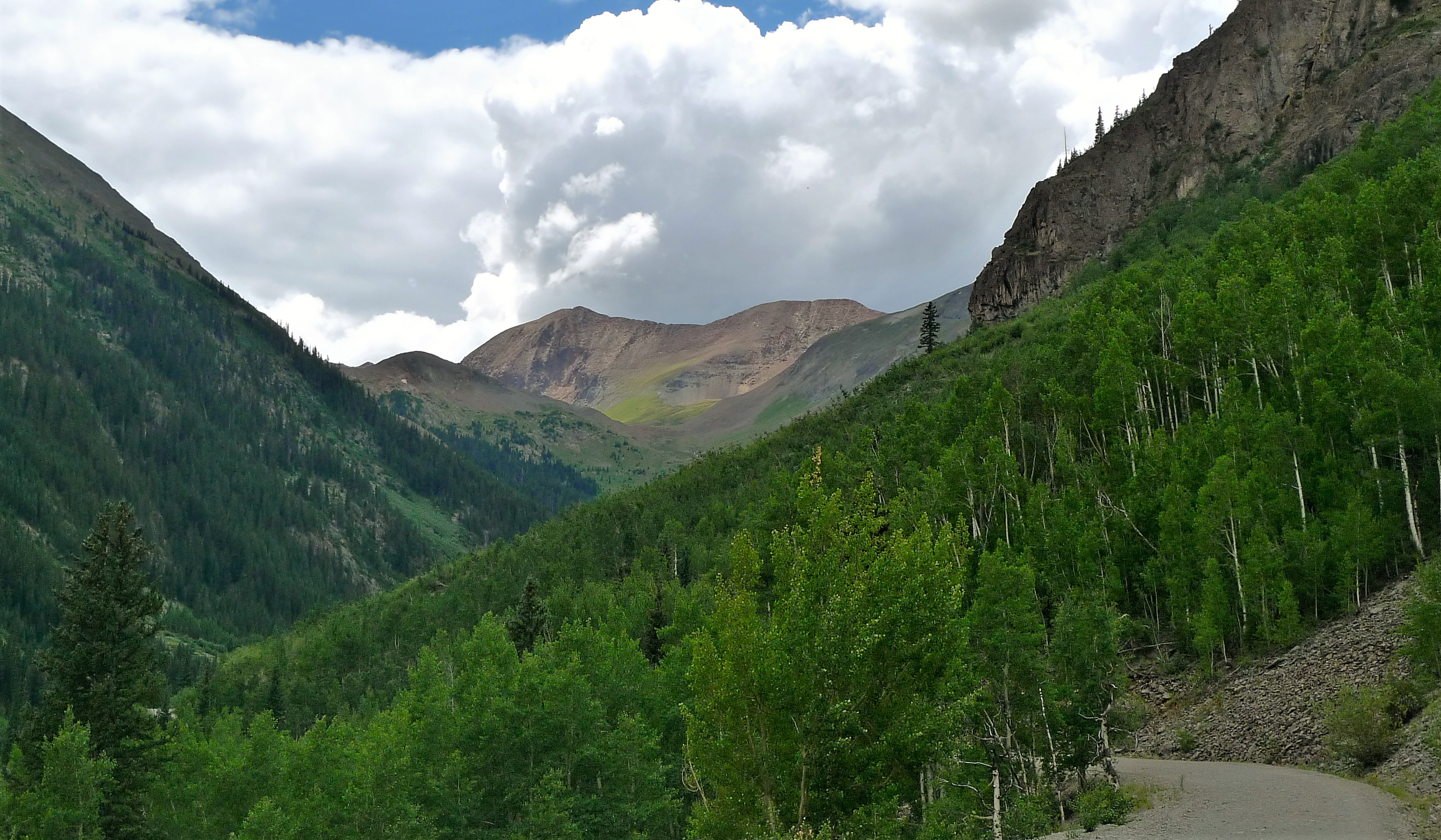
Northeast aspect of Gravel Mountain from Alpine Loop

== See also ==
- Mountains of Hinsdale County, Colorado
- Thirteener
- Wood Mountain
