= Wood Mountain (Colorado) =

Mountain in the state of Colorado

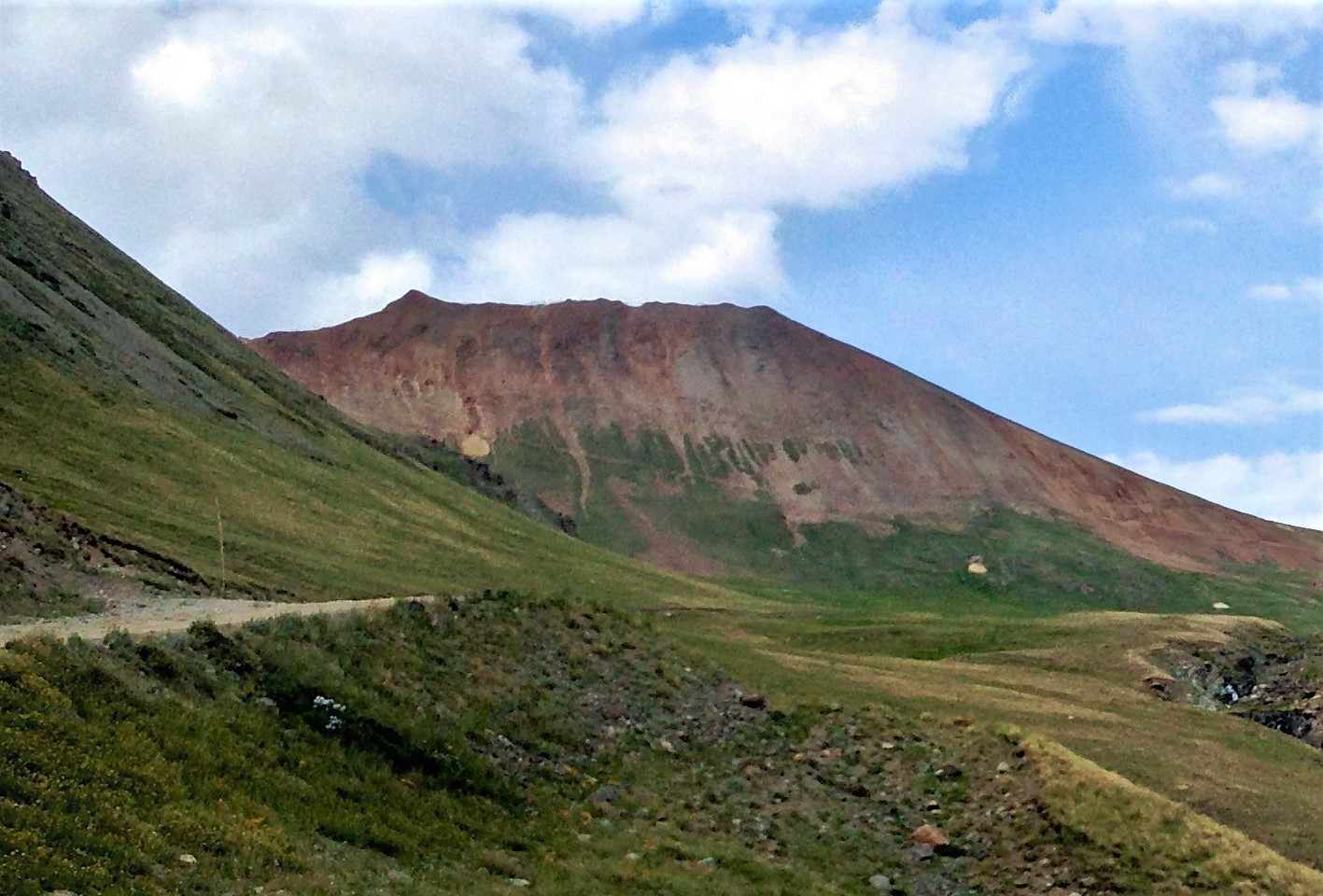
- Southwest aspect

Highest point
- Elevation: 13,682 ft (4,170 m)
- Prominence: 295 ft (90 m)
- Isolation: 0.47 mi (0.76 km)
- Coordinates: 37°56′51″N 107°32′17″W

Geography
- Location within Colorado Location within the United States
- Country: United States
- State: Colorado
- County: Hinsdale / San Juan
- Parent range: Rocky Mountains; San Juan Mountains
- Topo map: USGS Handies Peak

Climbing
- Easiest route: class 2 hiking

Wood Mountain is a 13,682-foot-elevation (4,170-meter) summit located on the boundary shared by Hinsdale County with San Juan County, in Colorado, United States.

== Description ==
Wood Mountain is situated nine miles southeast of the community of Ouray on land administered by the Bureau of Land Management. It is set west of the Continental Divide in the San Juan Mountains which are a subset of the Rocky Mountains. Precipitation runoff from the mountain's north slope drains to Henson Creek which is a tributary of the Gunnison River, the east aspect drains into the Lake Fork of the Gunnison River, and the southwest slope drains to the Animas River via Cinnamon Creek. Topographic relief is modest as the summit rises approximately 3,100 feet (940 meters) above Henson Creek in two miles (3.2 km). Access to the mountain is via the Alpine Loop Back Country Byway. The mountain's toponym has been officially adopted by the United States Board on Geographic Names, and has been recorded in publications since at least 1906.

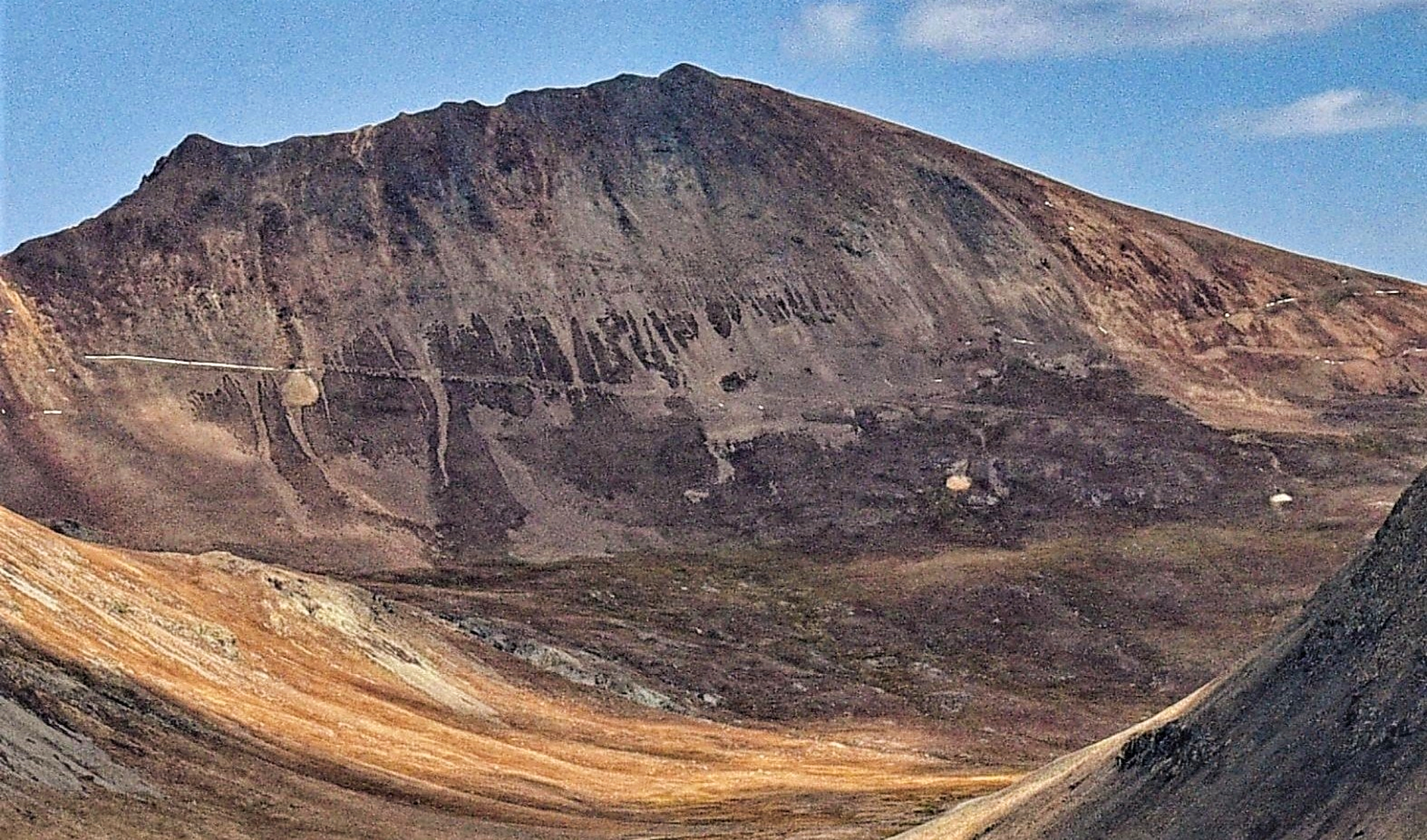
Wood Mountain

== Climate ==
According to the Köppen climate classification system, Wood Mountain is located in an alpine subarctic climate zone with cold, snowy winters, and cool to warm summers. Due to its altitude, it receives precipitation all year, as snow in winter and as thunderstorms in summer, with a dry period in late spring. Hikers can expect afternoon rain, hail, and lightning from the seasonal monsoon in late July and August.

== See also ==
- Mountains of Hinsdale County, Colorado
- Mountains of San Juan County, Colorado
- Thirteener
