= Cathedral, Colorado =

Census-designated place in Hinsdale County, CO, USA

- Census-designated place
- Location of the Cathedral CDP in Hinsdale County, Colorado
- Coordinates: 38°06′32″N 107°01′40″W
- Country: United States
- State: Colorado
- County: Hinsdale

Government
  - Type: Unincorporated community
  - Body: Hinsdale County

Area
  - Total: 21.279 sq mi (55.113 km^{2})
  - Land: 21.279 sq mi (55.113 km^{2})
  - Water: 0 sq mi (0.000 km^{2})
- Elevation: 8,914 ft (2,717 m)

Population (2020)
  - Total: 15
  - Density: 0.70/sq mi (0.27/km^{2})
- Time zone: UTC−07:00 (MST)
  - Summer (DST): UTC−06:00 (MDT)
- ZIP code: Powderhorn 81243
- Area codes: 970/748
- GNIS CDP ID: 2583219
- FIPS code: 12450

Cathedral is an unincorporated community and a census-designated place (CDP) located in Hinsdale County, Colorado, United States. The population of the Cathedral CDP was 15 at the United States Census 2020.

== History ==
The Cathedral, Colorado, post office operated from July 18, 1898, until September 30, 1921. The Powderhorn, Colorado, post office (Zip Code 81243) now serves the area.

== Geography ==
Cathedral is located in the northeast corner of Hinsdale County on the east side of Cebolla Creek, a north-flowing tributary of the Gunnison River. The community is at the junction of County Roads 50 and 45. County Road 50 leads southwest (upstream) 15 miles (24 km) to Colorado State Highway 149 at Slumgullion Pass, from which point Lake City, the Hinsdale County seat, is 9 miles (14 km) to the northwest. County Road 50 also leads north (downstream) from Cathedral into Gunnison and eventually via County Road 27 16 miles (26 km) to Highway 149 at Powderhorn.

The Cathedral CDP has an area of 13,619 acres (55.113 km^{2}), all land.

== Demographics ==
Cathedral CDP, Colorado
Year	Pop.	±%
2010	14	—
2020	15	+7.1%
Source: United States Census Bureau

The United States Census Bureau initially defined the Cathedral CDP for the United States Census 2010.

== See also ==
- List of census-designated places in Colorado
