= Alpine Loop =

Alpine Loop may refer to:

- The Alpine Loop National Back Country Byway in Colorado
- The Alpine Loop Scenic Byway in Utah
