= Henson Creek =

Creek in Hinsdale County, Colorado, United States

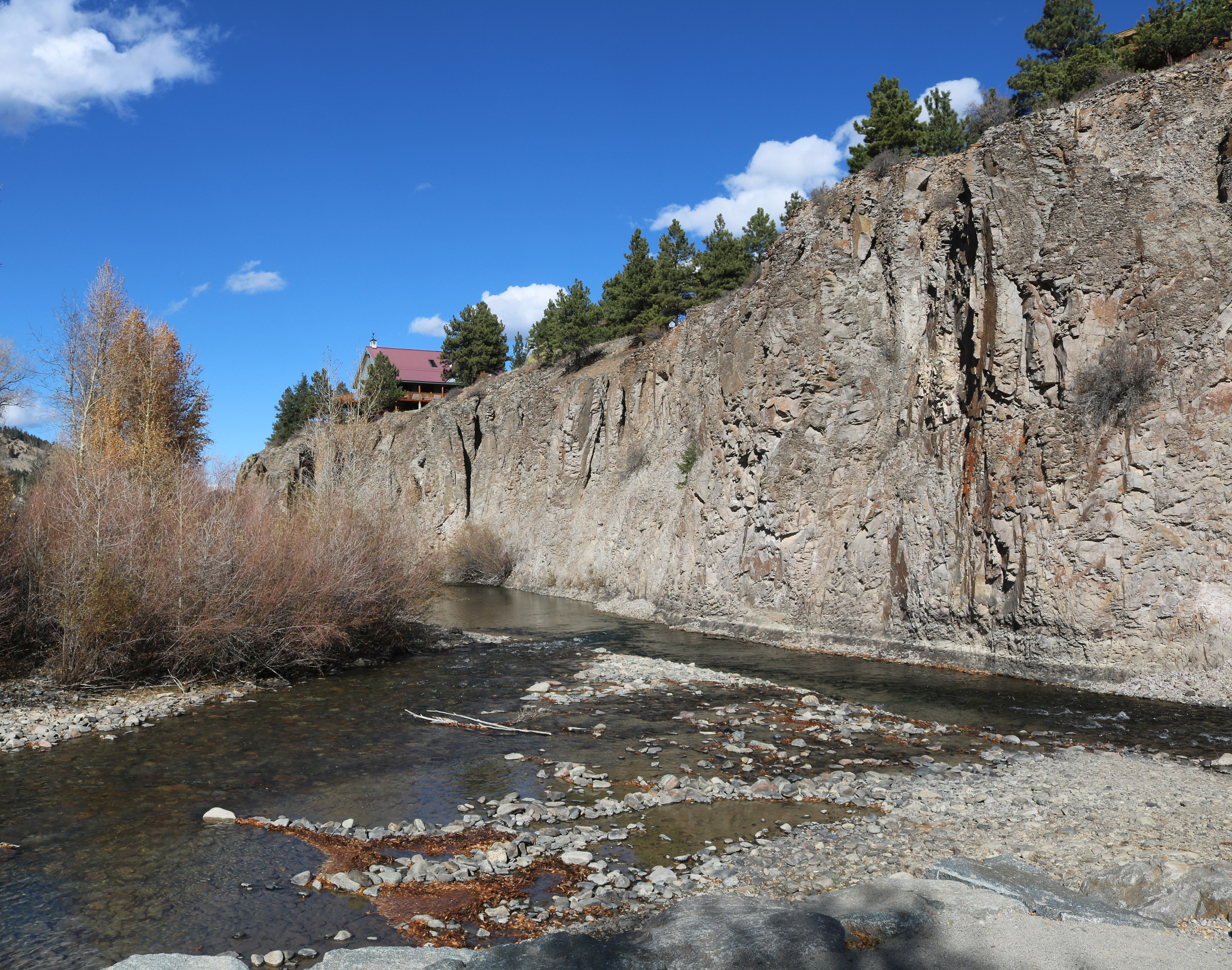
- The confluence of Henson Creek (left) and Lake Fork Gunnison River in Lake City, Colorado.

Physical characteristics
- Source
  - location: Sunshine Mountain in Hinsdale County, Colorado
  - coordinates: 38°00′06″N 107°34′25″W
- Mouth
  - location: Confluence with Lake Fork Gunnison River
  - coordinates: 38°01′32″N 107°18′52″W
  - elevation: 8,661 feet (2,640 meters)

Basin features
- Progression: Lake Fork Gunnison River—Gunnison—Colorado
- River system: Colorado River Basin

Henson Creek is a stream in Hinsdale County, Colorado, United States. It rises near Sunshine Mountain in the San Juan Mountains. It merges with Lake Fork Gunnison River in the town of Lake City.

== North Fork Henson Creek ==
North Fork Henson Creek joins Henson Creek near Capitol City, Colorado. From there, Henson Creek flows generally eastward and parallels Hinsdale County Road 20, here part of the Alpine Loop National Back Country Byway. It flows through Henson, Colorado, now a ghost town and the location of the abandoned Ute-Ulay Mine.

== Abandoned dam ==
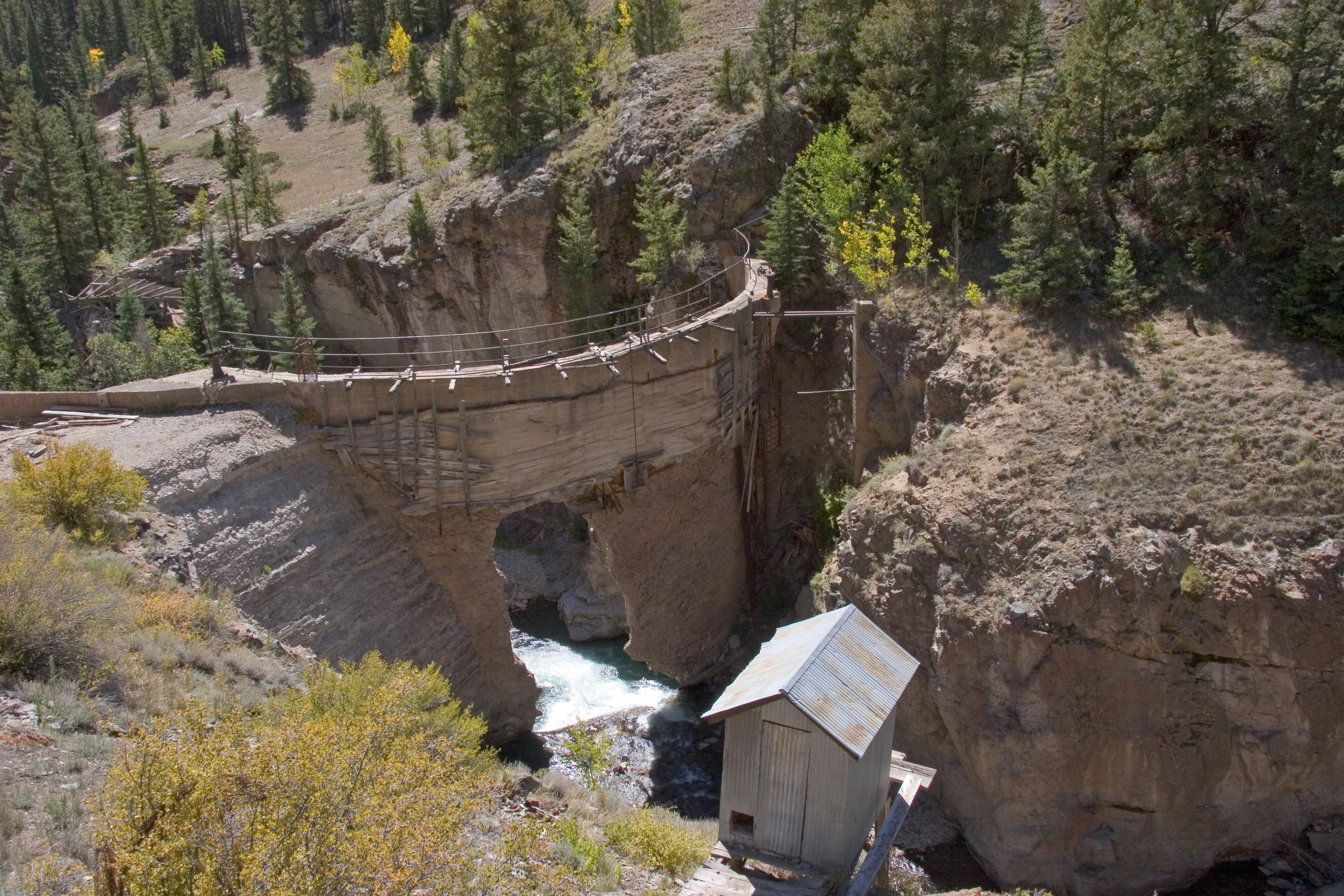
The dam on Henson creek that failed in 1973 (September 2006 image)

An old hydroelectric dam (38.020972 N, 107.378837 W) that supplied power for the mine lies on the creek at the Ute-Ulay mine site. Called the Hidden Treasure Dam, it burst in 1973 causing flooding and pollution downstream. The dam still stands and is visible from the road, but with a big hole in it.

== See also ==
- List of rivers of Colorado
- List of tributaries of the Colorado River
