= Powderhorn, Colorado =

Unincorporated community in Gunnison County, CO, USA

- Unincorporated community
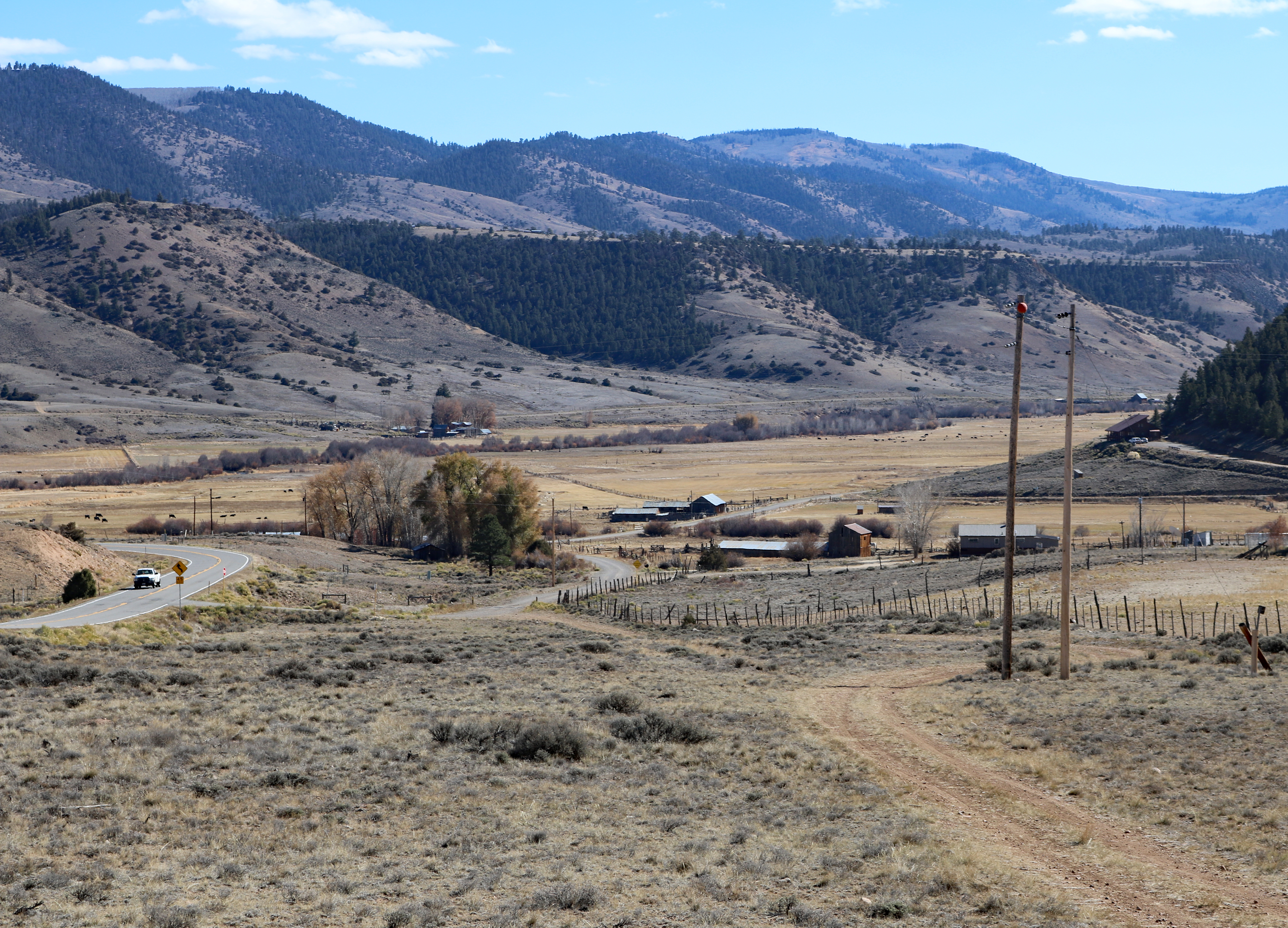
- View of Powderhorn, with State Highway 149 on the left, October 2018

- Location within Colorado Location within the United States
- Coordinates: 38°16′37″N 107°05′45″W
- Country: United States
- State: Colorado
- County: Gunnison
- Elevation: 8,098 ft (2,468 m)
- Time zone: UTC-7 (MST)
  - Summer (DST): UTC-6 (MDT)
- ZIP code: 81243
- Area code: 970
- GNIS feature ID: 204752

Powderhorn is an unincorporated community and a U.S. Post Office in Gunnison County, Colorado, United States. The Powderhorn Post Office has the ZIP Code 81243.

== History ==
In 1873, the Hayden Survey followed a well established Ute trail that passed through the future site of Powderhorn. They noted the well-watered valley and willow-lined creek, which the Utes called “The Stream with the White Banks.” Eventually the creek was to be named Cebolla Creek and the prominent tributary they noted emptying in from the south was named Powderhorn Creek. While the Utes used this region as summer hunting grounds and trappers and prospectors were in the area, the Survey made no note of settlement in the valley.

In 1874, road builder Otto Mears constructed the Saguache and San Juan Toll Road which ran from the town of Saguache west to the Los Pinos Indian Agency and then on through the Cebolla Valley to the Lake Fork of the Gunnison River and Lake City. The Cebolla and Powderhorn valleys then became accessible from Saguache to the east and Lake City to the southwest. One year later, in 1875, the Barlow and Sanderson stage line began its runs between Saguache and Lake City. A stage stop and toll gate on this road were located in the Cebolla Valley, and accommodating the travelers and freighters created business and brought proprietors and families. In 1876, a road was constructed between the Cebolla and Powderhorn valleys and Gunnison 26 miles (42 km) to the northeast, further promoting access, supply lines, and permanent settlement. A post office called White Earth was opened in 1876. It was located along Cebolla Creek 3 miles (4.8 km) upstream from the confluence with Powderhorn Creek. In 1880, the post office was moved nearer to the confluence of the two creeks and renamed Powderhorn. The first school was established in 1877.

While prospecting was common and several mines managed to produce marketable ore in the early days of Powderhorn, such efforts had largely ended by 1900. From the settlement’s beginning, ranching and hay production have driven the community’s economy.

Some say the community was named from a nearby landform in the shape of a powderhorn, while others believe an old powderhorn found near the town site caused the name to be selected.

== Climate ==
Climate type is dominated by the winter season, a long, bitterly cold period with short, clear days, relatively little precipitation mostly in the form of snow, and low humidity. The Köppen Climate Classification sub-type for this climate is "Dfc" (Continental Subarctic Climate).

Climate data for Powderhorn, Colorado
Month	Jan	Feb	Mar	Apr	May	Jun	Jul	Aug	Sep	Oct	Nov	Dec	Year
Mean daily maximum °C (°F)	−3 (27)	1 (33)	7 (44)	13 (55)	19 (67)	25 (77)	28 (83)	27 (81)	23 (73)	16 (61)	7 (45)	−1 (30)	13 (56)
Mean daily minimum °C (°F)	−18 (−1)	−16 (4)	−9 (16)	−4 (25)	1 (33)	4 (40)	8 (47)	8 (47)	3 (38)	−2 (28)	−8 (17)	−16 (4)	−4 (25)
Average precipitation mm (inches)	23 (0.9)	18 (0.7)	13 (0.5)	13 (0.5)	13 (0.5)	15 (0.6)	28 (1.1)	33 (1.3)	25 (1)	23 (0.9)	15 (0.6)	20 (0.8)	240 (9.5)
Source: Weatherbase

== Historical names ==
- White Earth - 1876
- Powderhorn – 1880

== See also ==
- List of municipalities in Colorado
