= Henson, Colorado =

Ghost town in Hindale County, Colorado, United States

- Unincorporated community
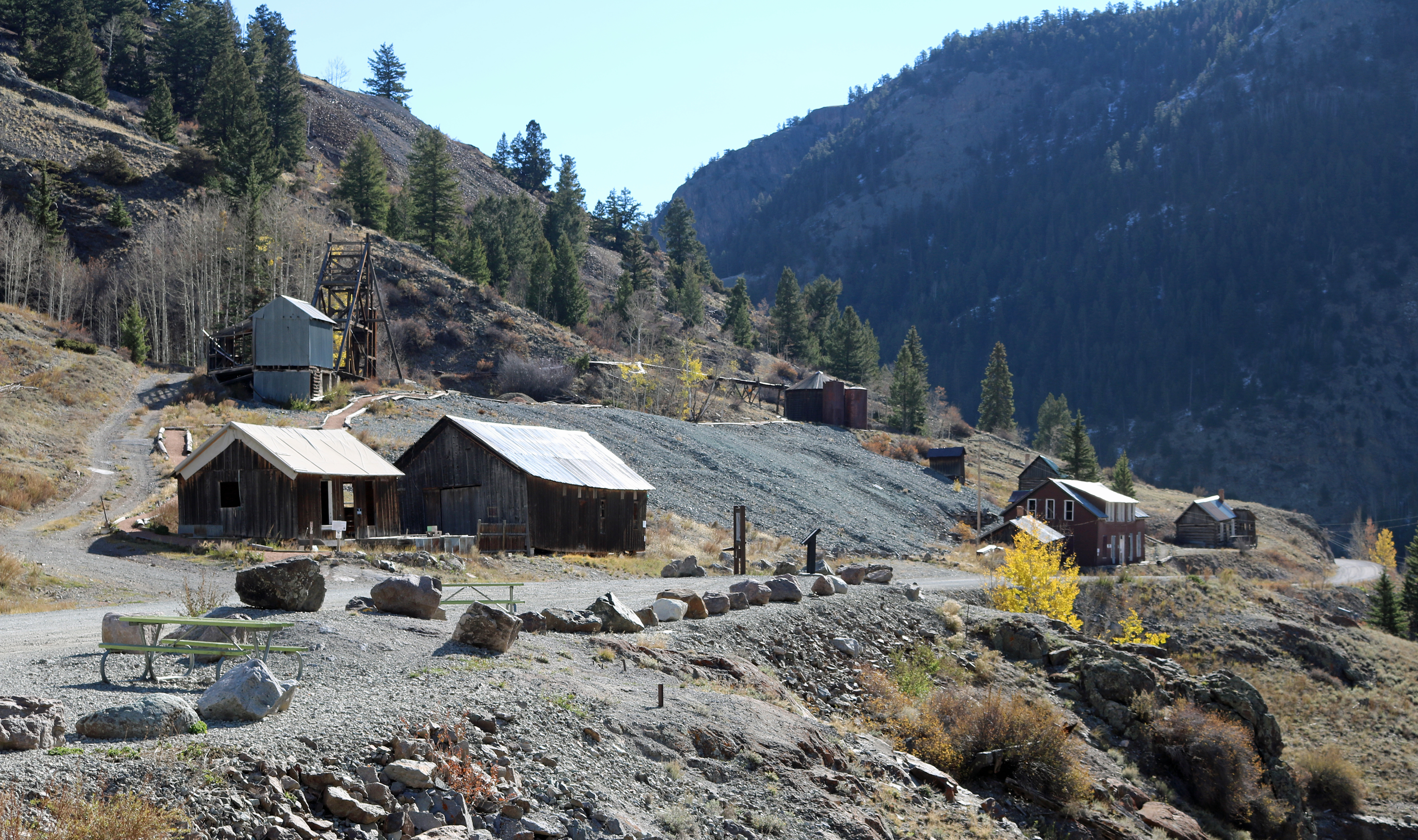
- The abandoned Ute-Ulay Mine in Henson.

- Location within the state of Colorado Henson (the United States)
- Coordinates: 38°01′15″N 107°22′37″W
- Country: United States
- State: Colorado
- County: Hinsdale
- Elevation: 9,236 ft (2,815 m)
- Time zone: UTC-7 (Mountain (MST))
  - Summer (DST): UTC-6 (MDT)
- GNIS feature ID: 188690

Henson is a ghost town in Hinsdale County, Colorado, United States. Its elevation is 9,236 feet (2,815 m). Henson's name has historically been spelled several different ways, including Hansen, Hanson, Hensen, and Honsen; the Board on Geographic Names officially supported the current spelling in 1896. Henson was named for Henson Creek, which was named for a pioneer settler. The Henson post office operated from May 17, 1883, until November 30, 1913.

Henson is the site of the Ute-Ulay Mine, now abandoned.

== Climate ==
The climate is dominated by the winter season: a long, bitterly cold period with short, clear days, relatively little precipitation mostly in the form of snow, and low humidity. The Köppen climate classification sub-type for this climate is "Dfc" (Continental Subarctic Climate).

Climate data for Henson, Colorado
Month	Jan	Feb	Mar	Apr	May	Jun	Jul	Aug	Sep	Oct	Nov	Dec	Year
Mean daily maximum °C (°F)	1.1 (33.9)	3.2 (37.8)	7.1 (44.7)	11.8 (53.3)	17.0 (62.6)	22.7 (72.9)	24.9 (76.8)	23.4 (74.2)	20.4 (68.8)	15.3 (59.5)	7.5 (45.5)	1.2 (34.2)	12.9 (55.3)
Mean daily minimum °C (°F)	−18.6 (−1.4)	−16.1 (3.1)	−10.4 (13.3)	−5.2 (22.7)	−0.4 (31.2)	3.6 (38.5)	7.1 (44.7)	6.3 (43.4)	2.1 (35.8)	−3.6 (25.6)	−10.3 (13.4)	−17.1 (1.3)	−5.2 (22.6)
Average precipitation mm (inches)	20 (0.8)	20 (0.8)	25 (1)	28 (1.1)	25 (1)	20 (0.8)	51 (2)	56 (2.2)	36 (1.4)	33 (1.3)	25 (1)	25 (1)	360 (14.2)
Source: Weatherbase

== See also ==
- List of ghost towns in Colorado
