= Cebolla Creek =

Stream in Gunnison and Hinsdale County, Colorado, U.S.

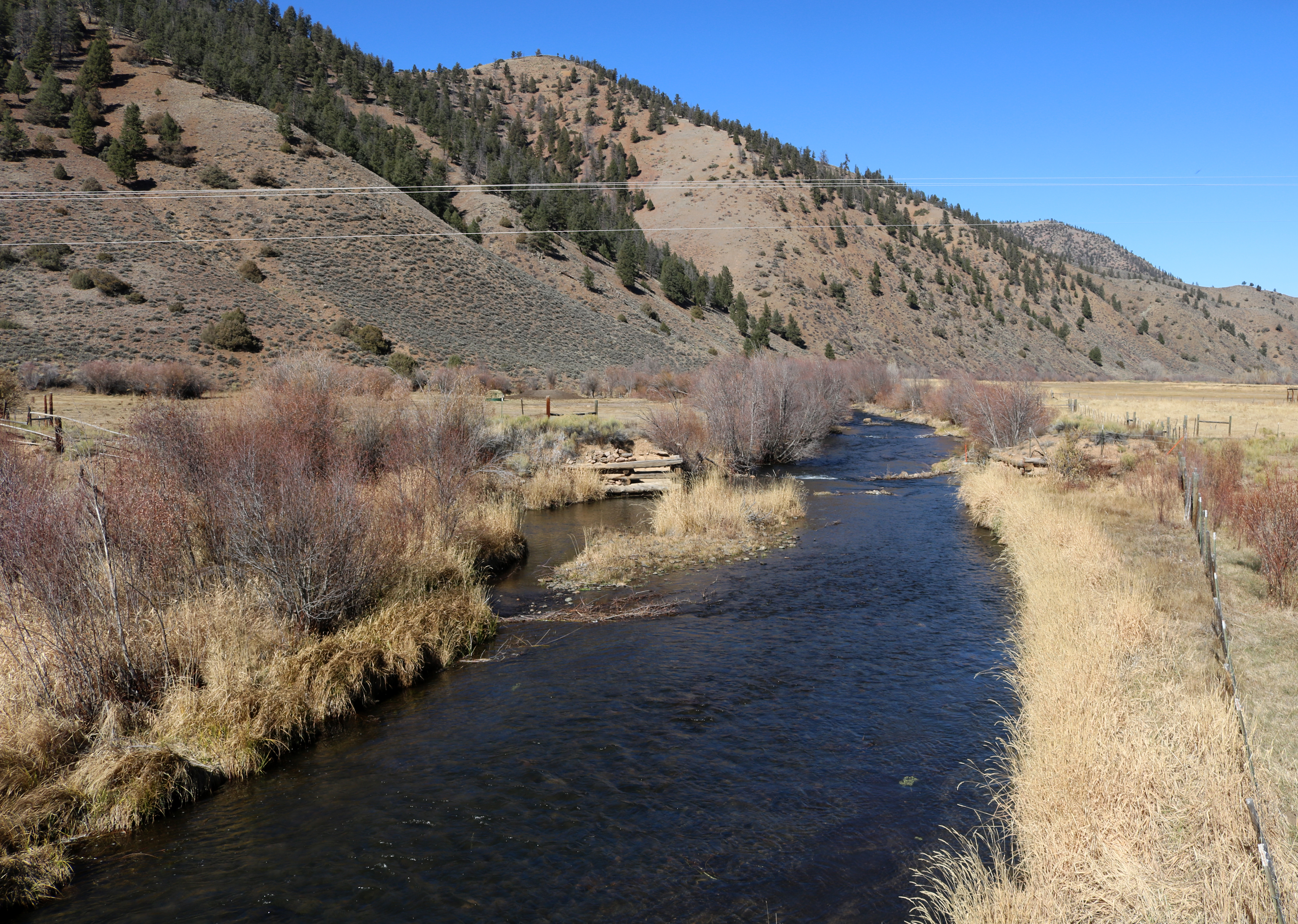
- The creek in Powderhorn, October 2018

- Location within Colorado

Location
- Country: United States
- State: Colorado
- Counties: Gunnison, Hinsdale

Physical characteristics
- Mouth: Gunnison River
  - coordinates: 38°28′26″N 107°13′00″W

Cebolla Creek is a stream in Gunnison and Hinsdale counties in Colorado, United States, that is a tributary of the Gunnison River.

The river's name comes from the Native Americans of the area, who relied on wild onions (Spanish: cebolla) as a food source.

== Historical names ==
- Stream with the White Banks (translated from Ute)
- Soda Creek - 1873
- White Earth River - 1874
- Cebolla Creek

== See also ==
- List of rivers of Colorado
