= Capitol City, Colorado =

Ghost town in Hinsdale County, Colorado, USA

- ghost town
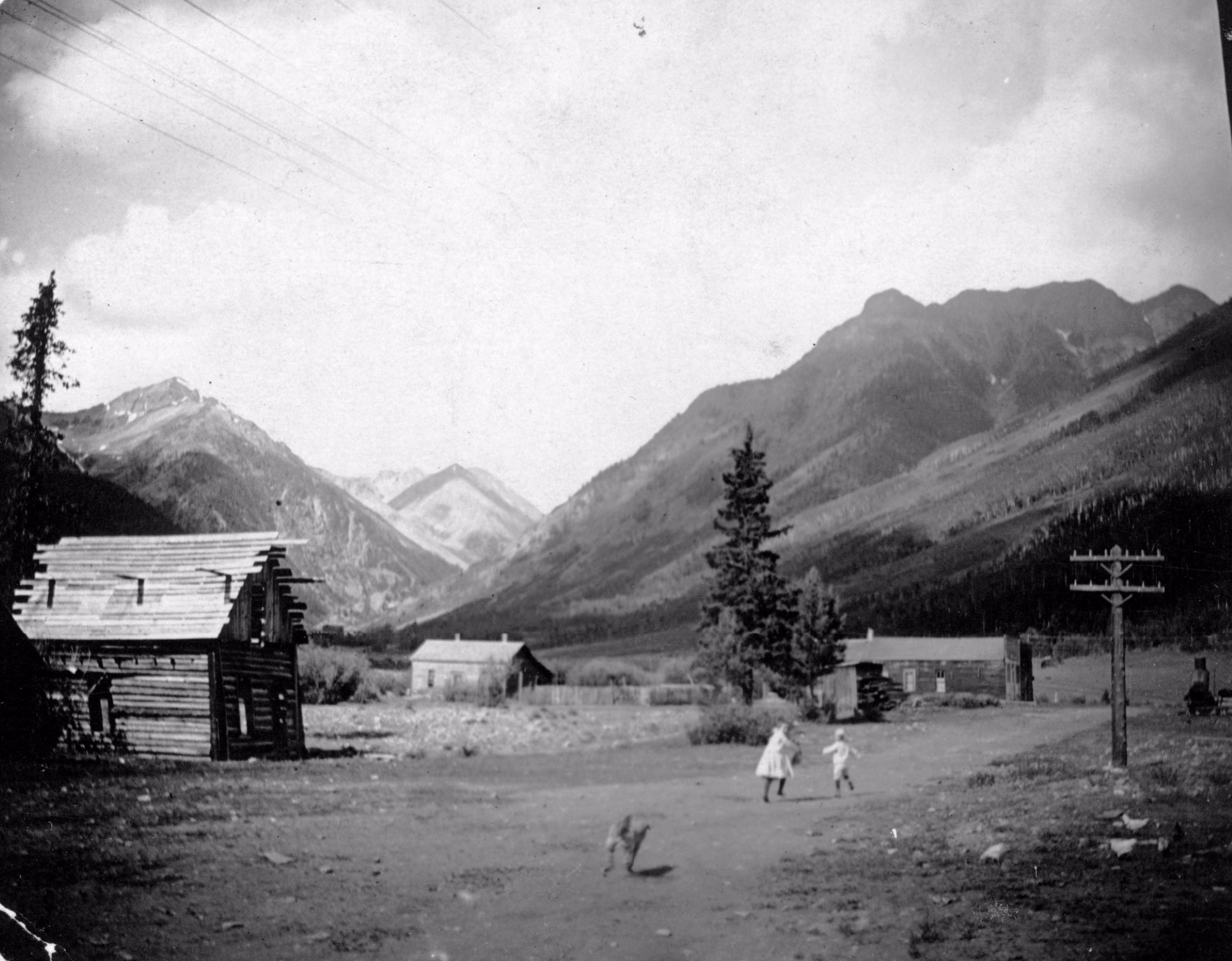
- Two children and a dog in Capitol City (Galena City), Colorado, circa 1880-1900.

- Location of Capitol City, Colorado. Capitol City (Colorado)
- Coordinates: 38°00′26″N 107°28′00″W
- Country: United States
- State: Colorado
- County: Hinsdale
- Elevation: 9,712 ft (2,960 m)
- Time zone: UTC−07:00 (MST)
  - Summer (DST): UTC−06:00 (MDT)
- GNIS pop ID: 203896

Capitol City is an extinct silver mining town located in Hinsdale County, Colorado, United States. Founded as Galena City in 1877, the townsite is located on the Alpine Loop National Scenic Back Country Byway.

== History ==
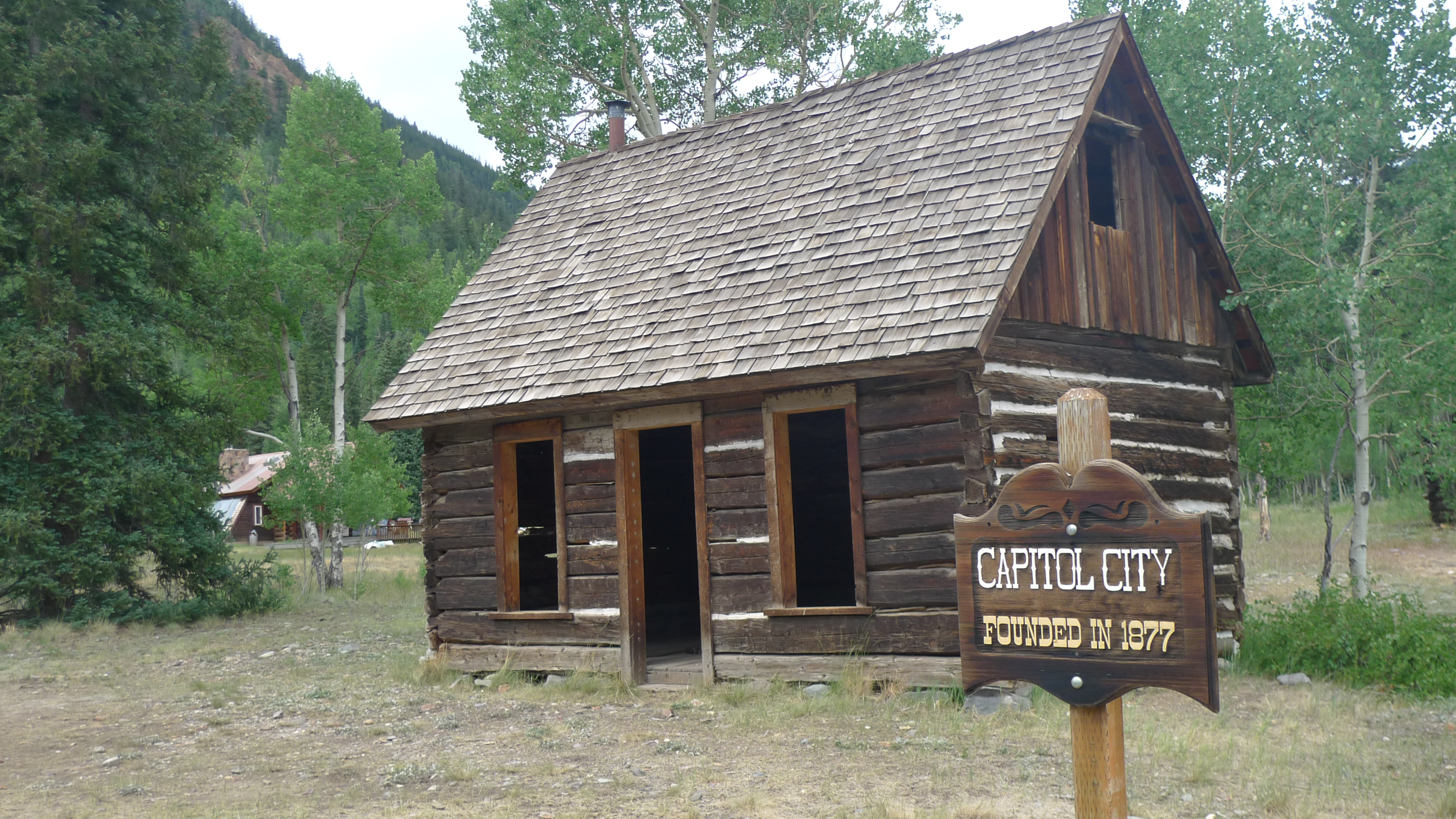
Remains of the City, July 2010

Capitol City was founded in 1877 by George Lee and was originally named Galena City. The Capitol City, Colorado, post office operated from May 18, 1877, until October 30, 1920. At its peak, the city boasted around 800 citizens and its founders wished it had become the capital of Colorado. In order to try and garner interest, Lee changed the name to Capitol City as he had also dreamed of becoming the state's governor. Today only the post office, a structure called "Lee's Smelter Stack", some rubble buildings, and a few brick kilns remain. There are private homes and private land surrounding the site.

Lee built a beautiful home here with brick hauled from Pueblo at $1 per brick. It reportedly had a generous living room, theater with an orchestral pit and a few guest ballrooms. In addition to his house, he built the Henson Creek smelter and sawmill. The original 200-acre town site had everything needed, including a few hotels, restaurants, bars, a post office, schoolhouse, cabins, a sawmill and mining smelters. The richest year was in 1877, when the town boasted a population of 800. When the cost of silver dropped, so did the residents. Lawsuits and difficult transportation also sped up the town's downfall.

== Geography ==
The city is located on Engineer Pass, a part of the Alpine 4×4 Loop, a national scenic byway. The town can be accessed via Lake City, which is situated 9 mi (14.5 km) to the East on CO-20. The site can be easily accessed by 2WD automobiles between June and November.

== See also ==
- List of ghost towns in Colorado
