= Alpine Loop Back Country Byway =

Road in Colorado, United States

Coordinates: 37.9756°N 107.5845°W

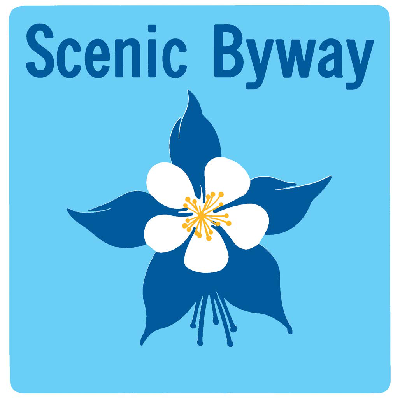
Alpine Loop Back Country Byway

Route information
- Maintained by CDOT
- Length: 63 mi (101 km)
- Existed: 1989–present

Major junctions
- West end: US 550 at Ouray or Silverton
- East end: SH 149 Lake City

Location
- Country: United States
- State: Colorado
- Counties: Hindale, Ouray, and San Juan

Highway system
- Scenic Byways; National; National Forest; BLM; NPS; Colorado State Highway System; Interstate; US; State; Scenic

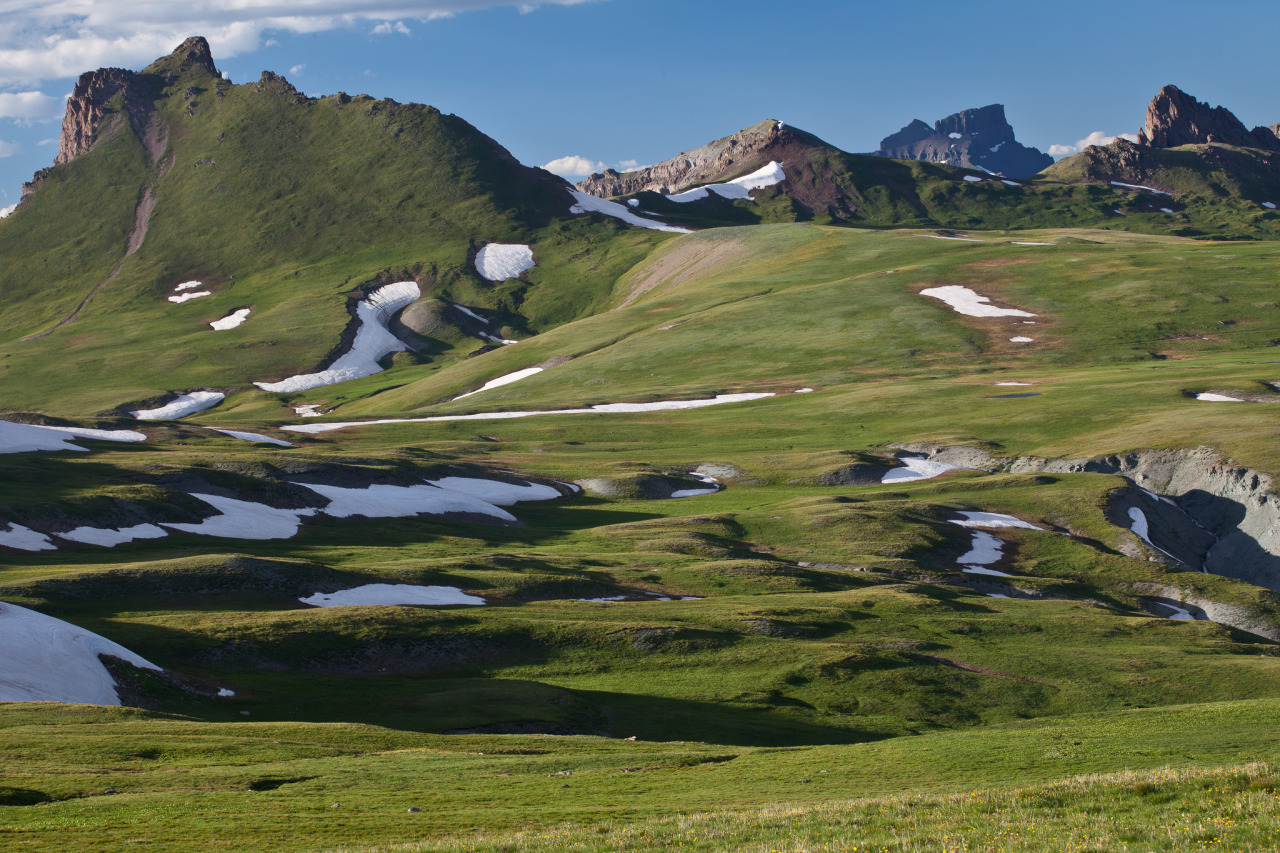
Wilderness near the Alpine Loop. (Wildhorse Peak on the left)

The Alpine Loop Back Country Byway is a rugged 63-mile (101 km) Back Country Byway and Colorado Scenic and Historic Byway located in the high San Juan Mountains of Hindale, Ouray, and San Juan counties, Colorado, USA. The byway connects the mountain towns of Lake City, Ouray, and Silverton. The route ranges in elevation from (a mere) 7,792 feet (2,375 m) in Ouray to 12,800 feet (3,901 m) at Engineer Pass. The byway features high mountain passes, alpine tundra, beautiful mountain meadows, ghost towns, and relics of the silver mining era. While the meadows and tundra are accessible to ordinary passenger vehicles, a high-clearance 4-wheel drive vehicle is required to travel the entire route.

The Silverton Historic District and the Shenandoah-Dives (Mayflower) Mill are National Historic Landmarks. The Alpine Loop connects with the San Juan Skyway Scenic and Historic Byway at Ouray and Silverton.

== Route ==
The Alpine Loop is generally considered to begin and end at Lake City. From there the route commonly followed is west over Cinnamon Pass or Engineer Pass to Animas Forks, and then returning east back to Lake City. The clockwise circuit starting with Cinnamon Pass generally puts the vehicle on the inside "lane" of the mountainous portions with the driver on the outside, providing a better view of the relative position of the vehicle and the outer edge of the road at the top of the drop-off. The counter-clockwise direction is preferable for less powerful 4-wheel drive vehicles that may have a difficult time ascending steep sections on the western portion of Engineer Pass.

== Major intersections ==
County	Location	mi	km	Destinations	Notes
Hinsdale	Lake City	0.00	0.00	SH 149 north	Zero milepost
Hinsdale				FH 14	
Hinsdale				SH 149 south	Becomes FH 30 west
Hinsdale				FH 33	
Hinsdale				FH 33	
Hinsdale				Camp Redcloud	
Hinsdale				Castle Lakes Campground	
Hinsdale				FH 36	
Hinsdale				FH 35	
Hinsdale				FH 12	
Hinsdale				FH 5 west	Becomes FH 5 west
San Juan				FH 2 south	Becomes FH 2 north
San Juan				FH 18	
San Juan				FH 17	
San Juan				FH 2 west	Becomes an unmarked road
Hinsdale				FH 21 south	Becomes FH 21 north
Hinsdale				FH 21 north	Becomes FH 20X east
Hinsdale				FH 20 west	Becomes FH 20 east
Hinsdale				FH 24	
Hinsdale				FH 23	
Hinsdale				SH 149	
1.000 mi = 1.609 km; 1.000 km = 0.621 mi

== Gallery ==
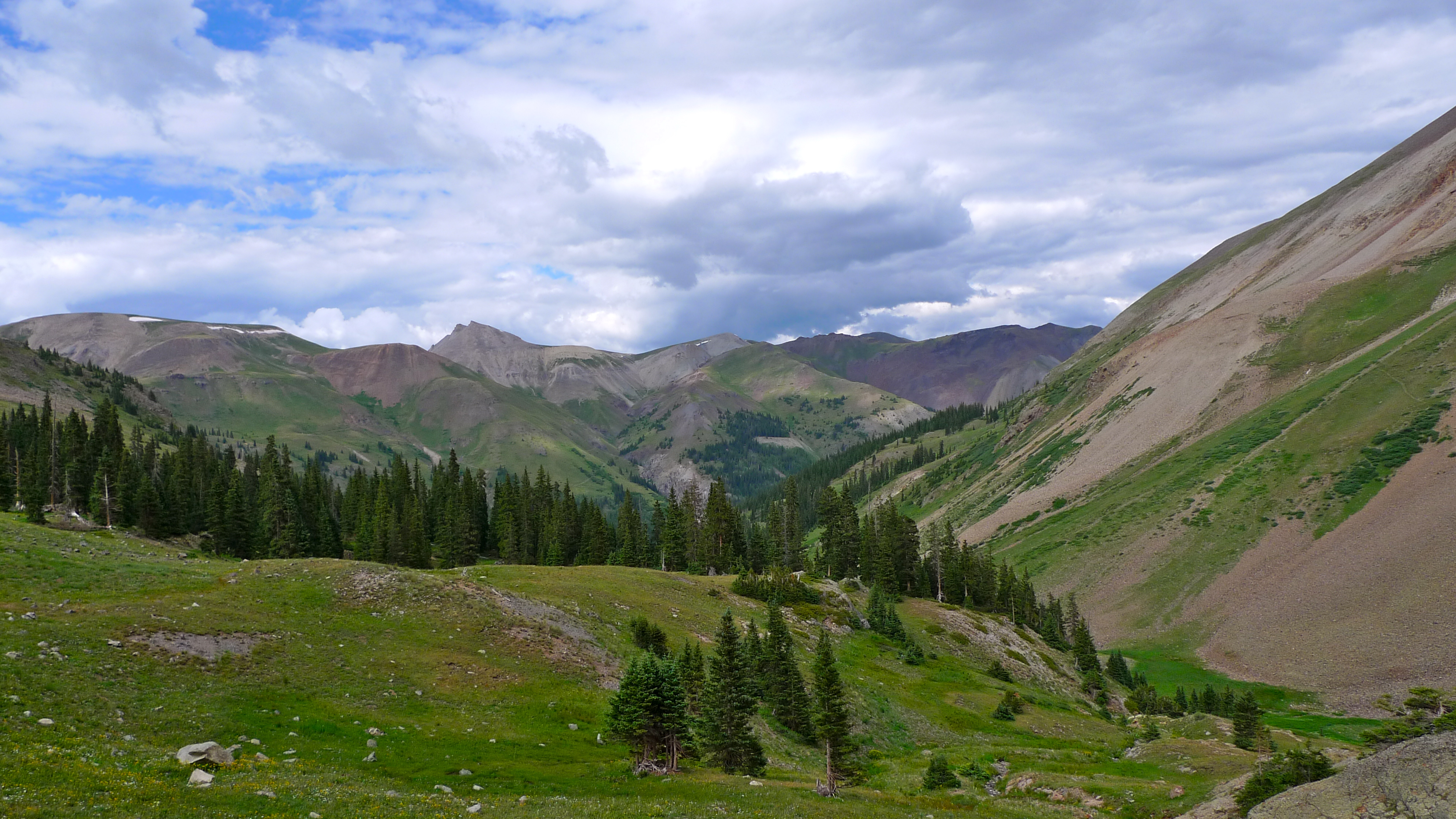
Along the road to Engineer pass

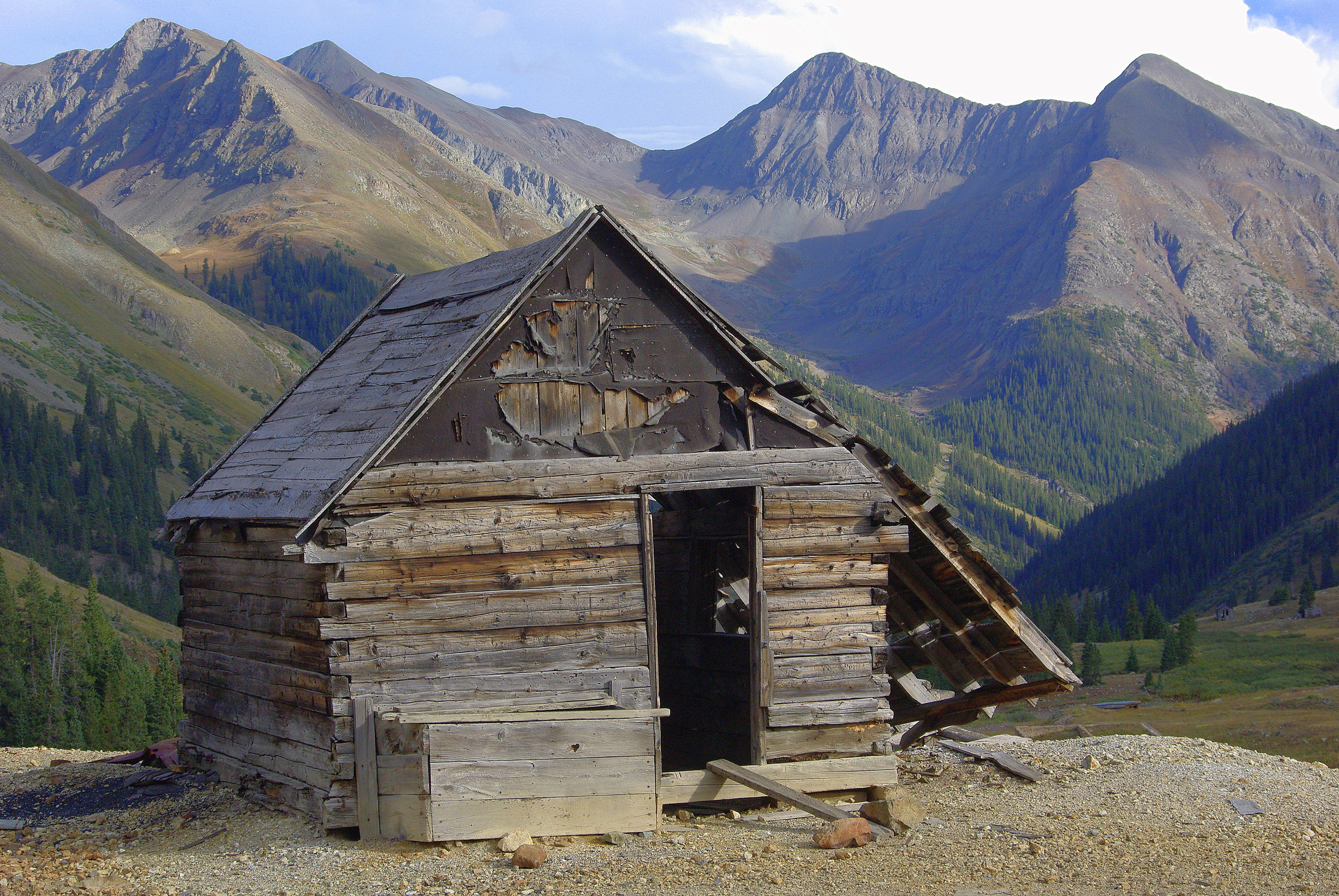
Abandoned building in Animas Forks, on the Alpine Loop

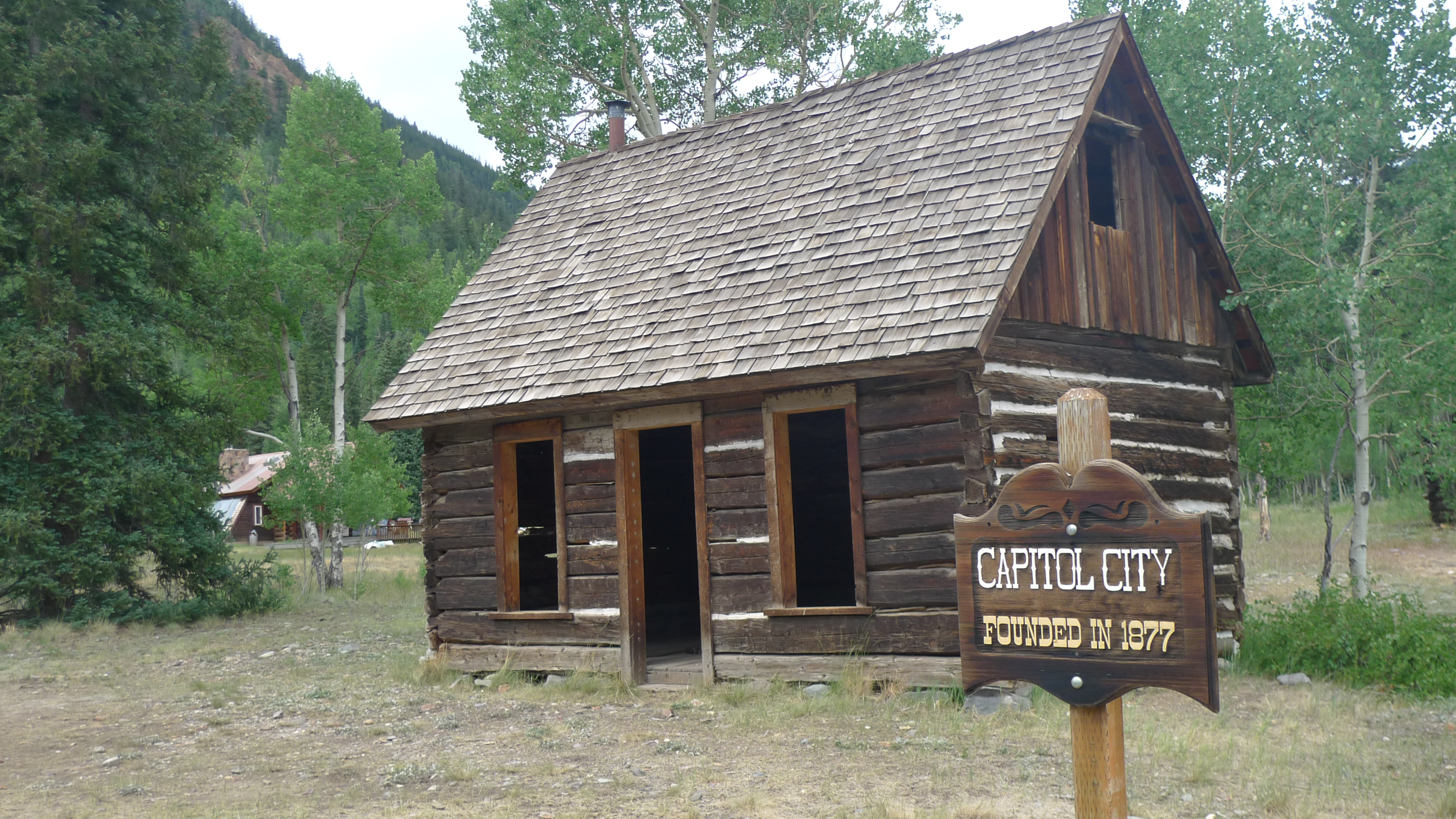
Capitol City ghost town

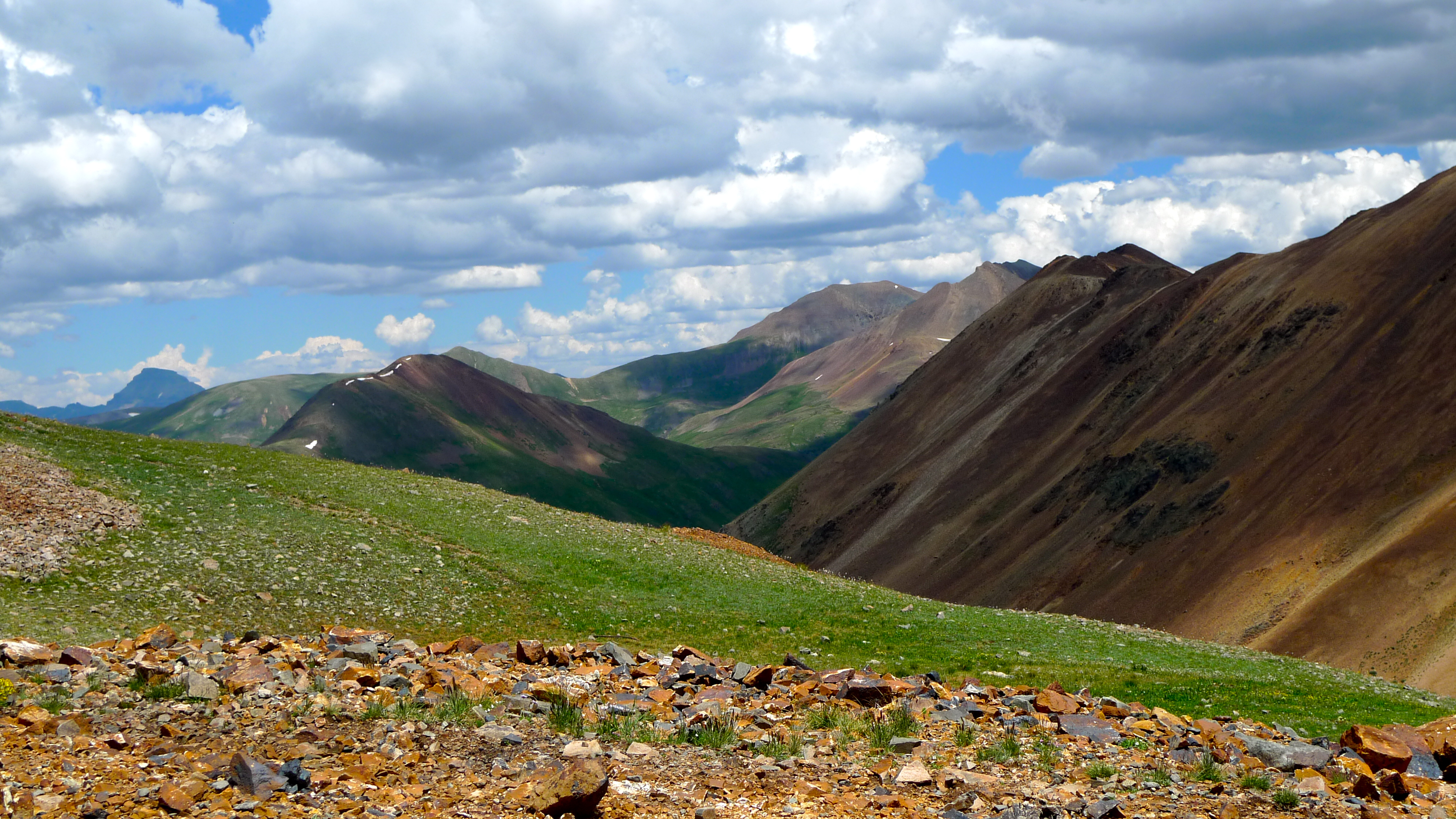
California Gulch Road, near Animas Forks

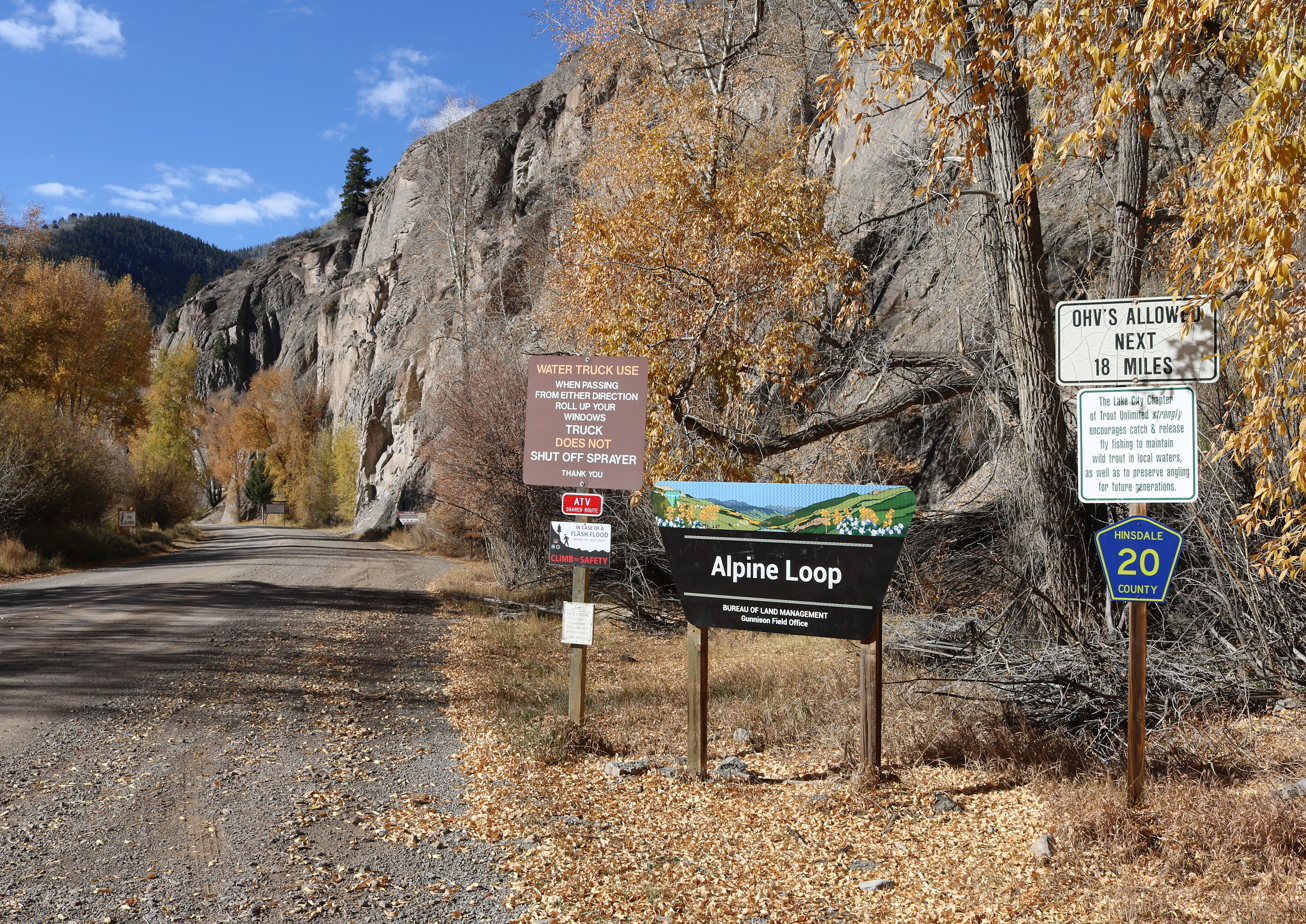
Signs at the start of the road in Lake City

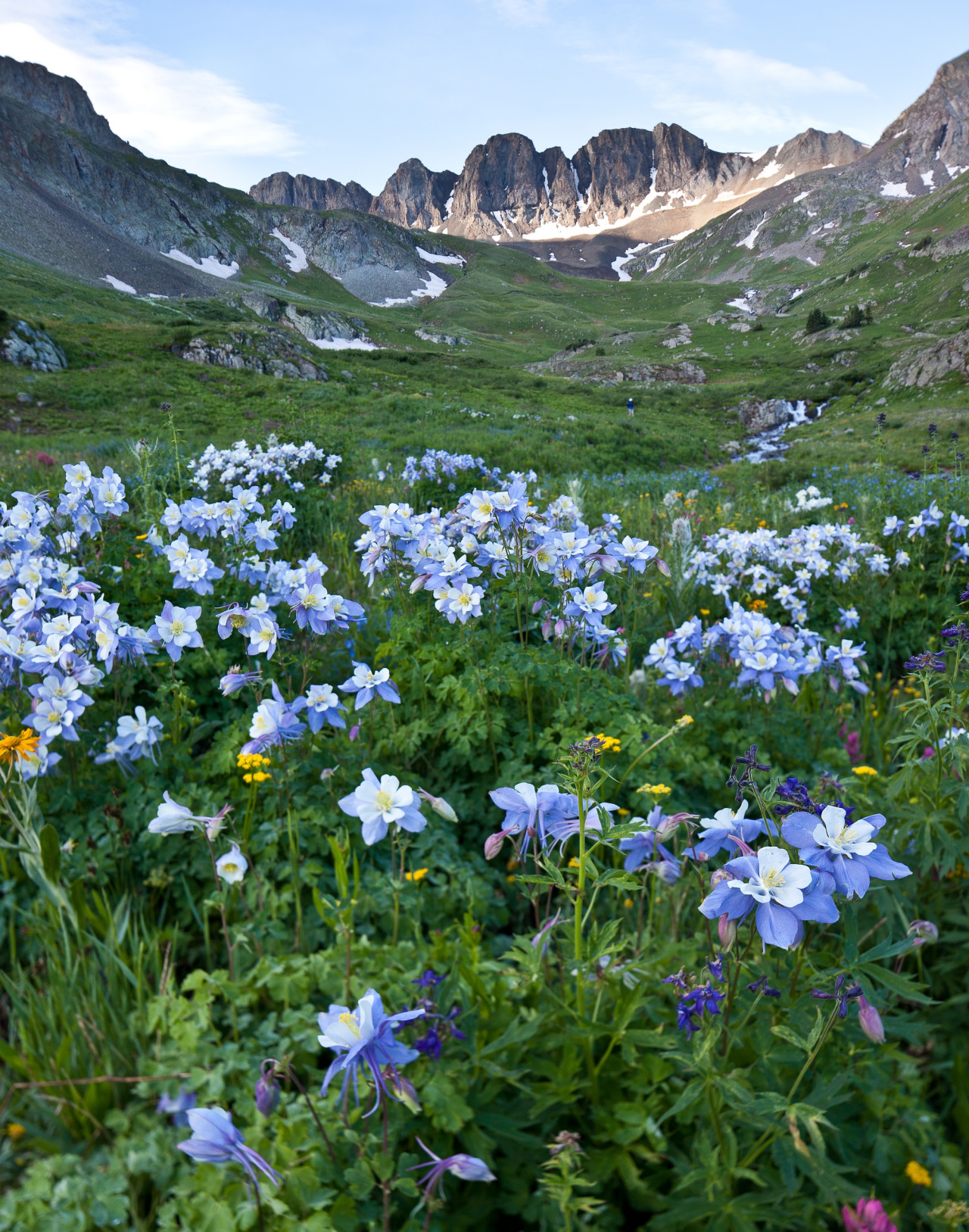
Colorado blue columbine along the Alpine Loop

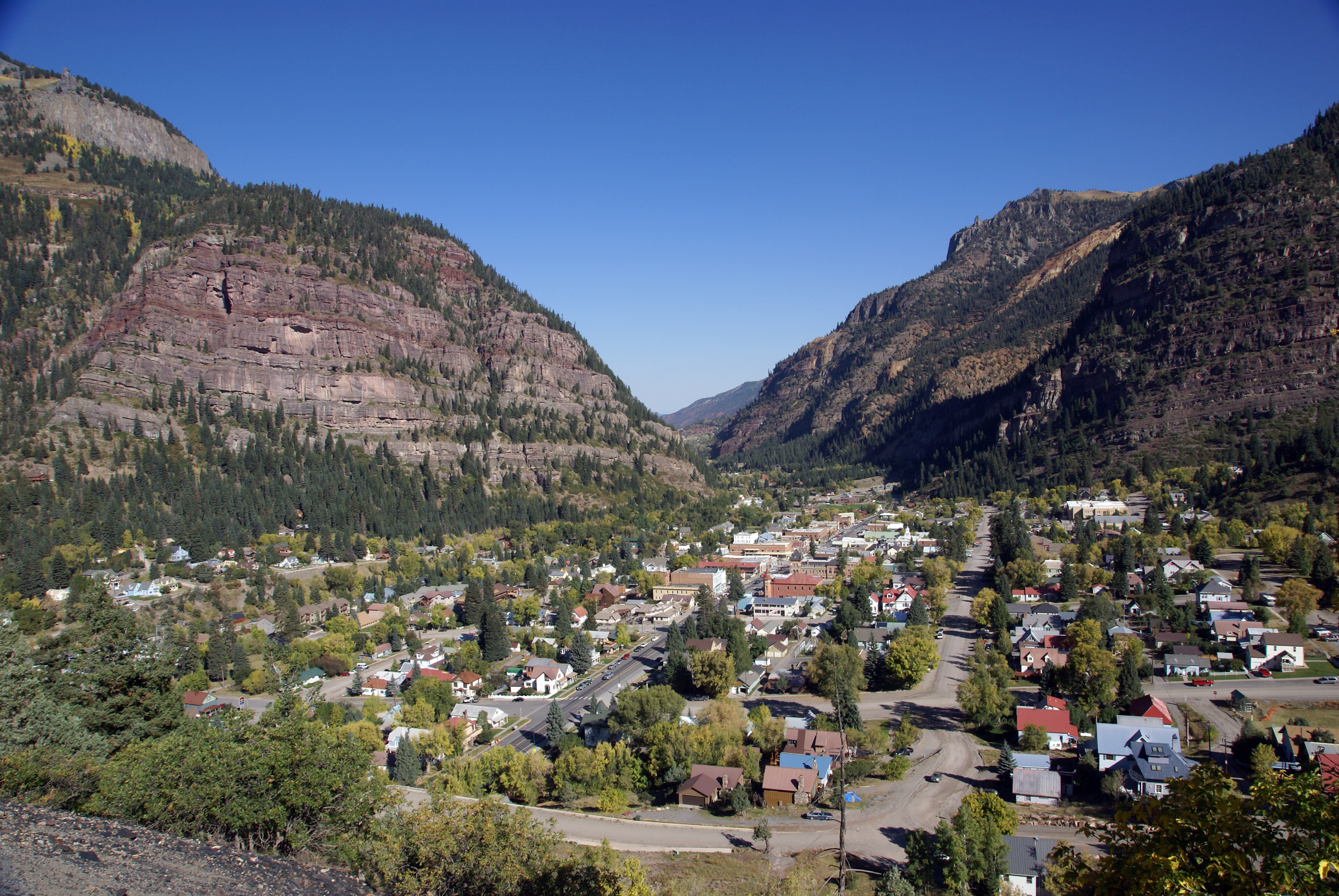
Ouray

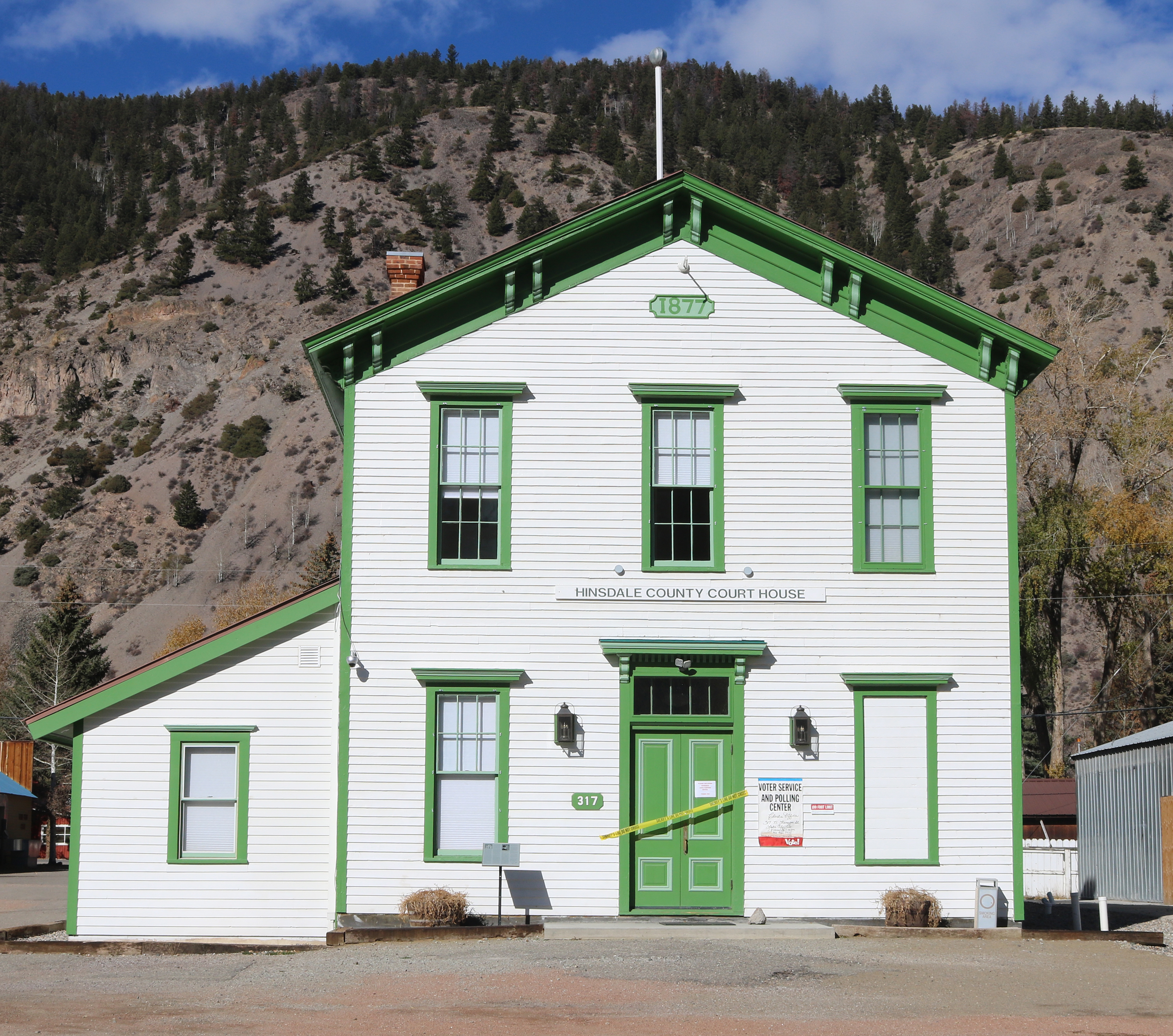
The Hinsdale County Court House in Lake City

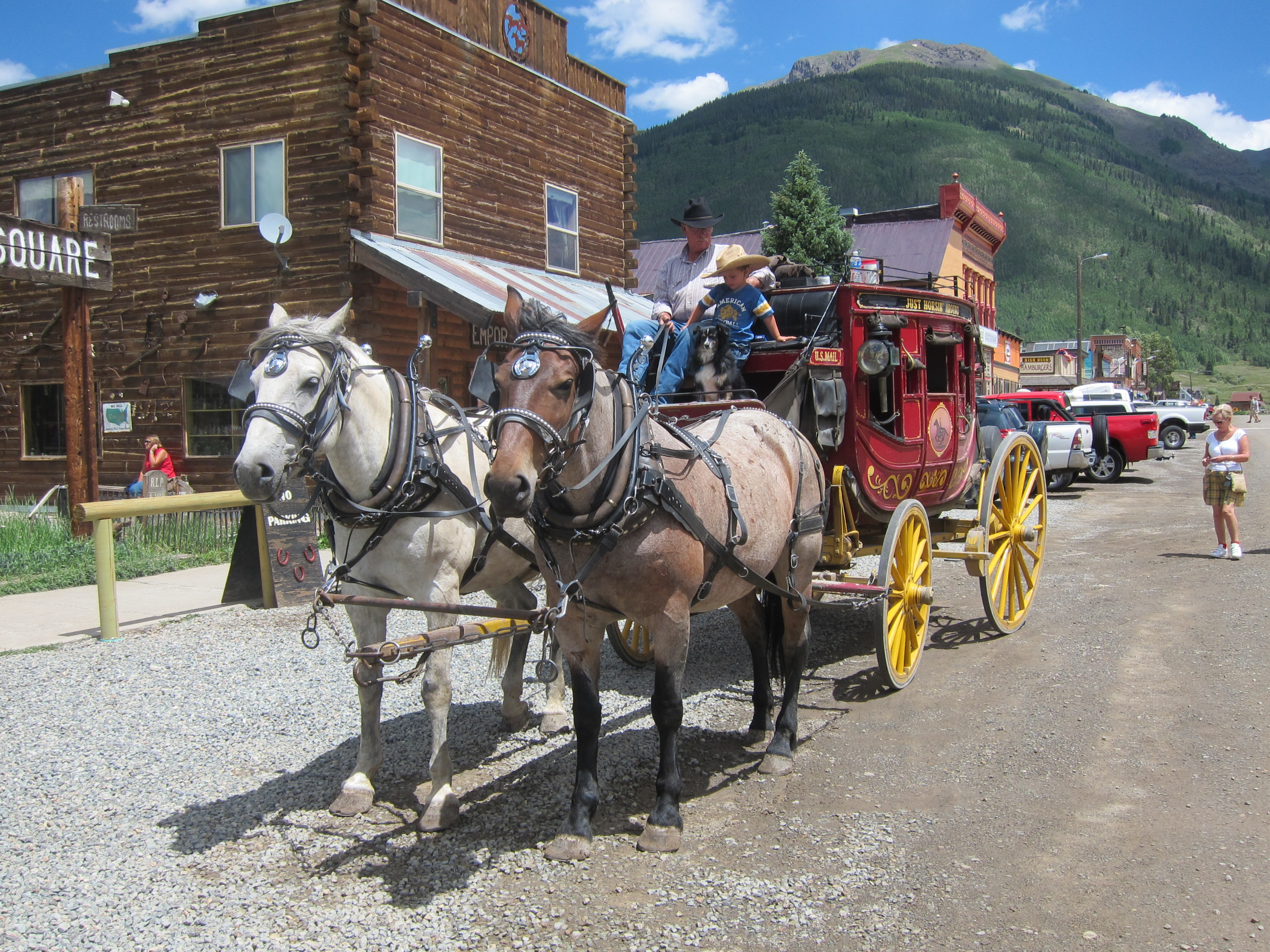
A stagecoach in Silverton

== See also ==
- History Colorado
