= Hinsdale County, Colorado =

County in Colorado, United States

- County
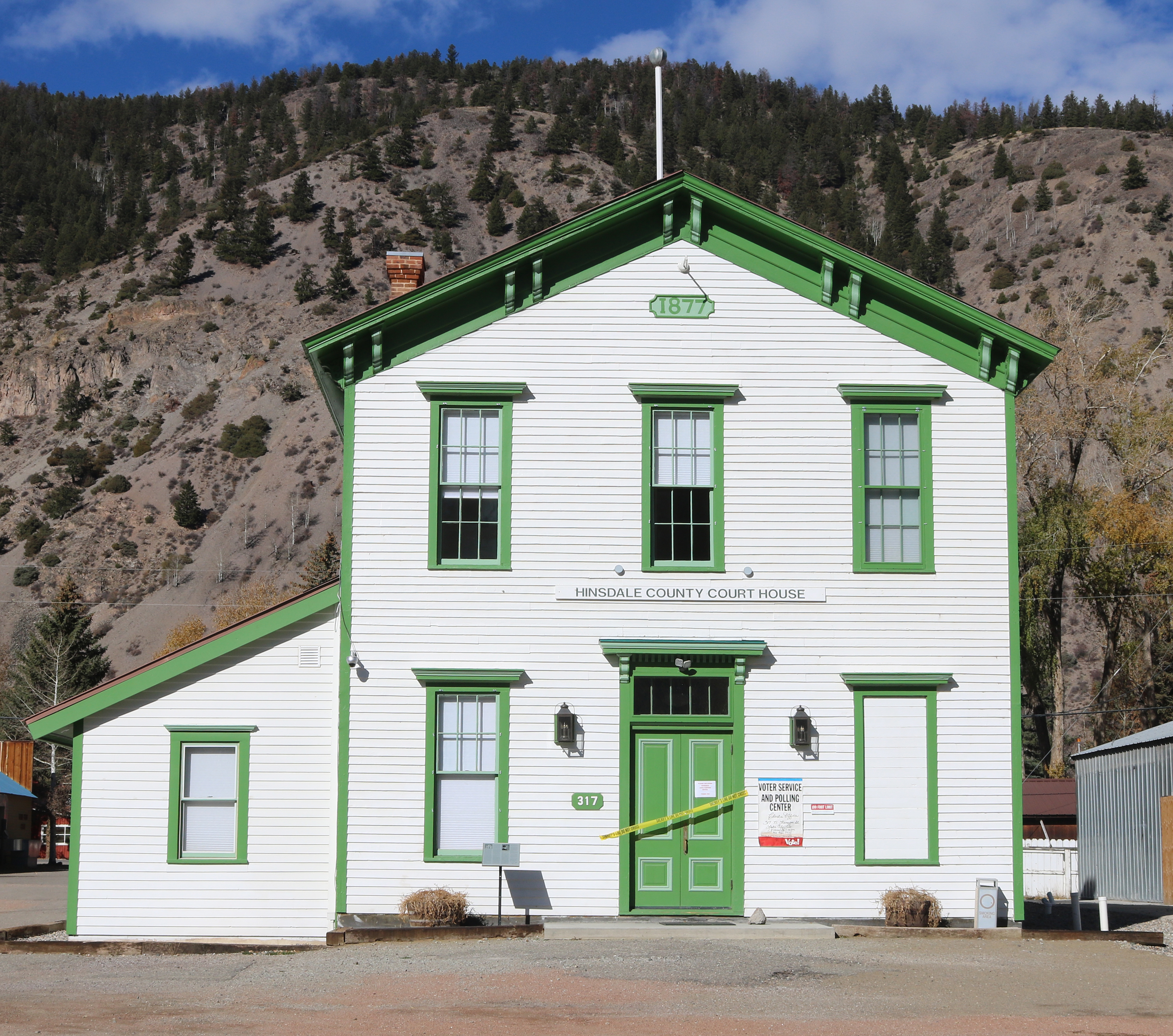
- The 1877 Hinsdale County Court House in Lake City, Colorado. (photo taken 2018)

- Location within the U.S. state of Colorado
- Coordinates: 37.82°N 107.28°W
- Country: United States
- State: Colorado
- Founded: February 10, 1874
- Named for: George A. Hinsdale
- Seat: Lake City
- Largest town: Lake City

Area
  - Total: 1,123 sq mi (2,910 km^{2})
  - Land: 1,117 sq mi (2,890 km^{2})
  - Water: 5.9 sq mi (15 km^{2}) 0.5%

Population (2020)
  - Total: 788
  - Estimate (2025): 753 ▼
  - Density: 0.705/sq mi (0.272/km^{2})
- Time zone: UTC−7 (Mountain)
  - Summer (DST): UTC−6 (MDT)
- Congressional district: 3rd
- Website: hinsdalecounty.colorado.gov

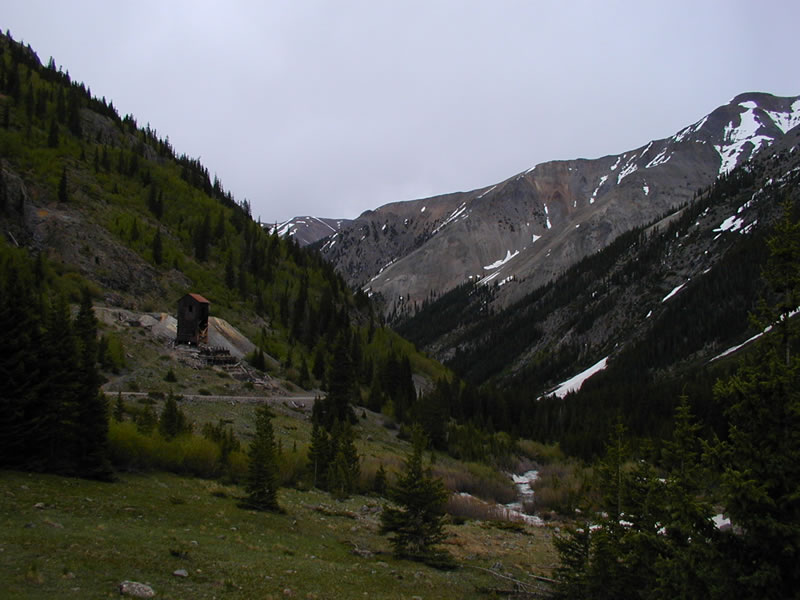
Bonanza-Empire Chief mine and mill, on the Alpine Loop. The mill ruins were stabilized in 2000 by the Bureau of Land Management and Hinsdale County Historical Society. In 2007–2008, the mill ruins were demolished by an avalanche.

Hinsdale County is a county located in the U.S. state of Colorado. As of the 2020 census, the population was 788, making it the second least-populous county in Colorado. With a population density of only 0.71 inhabitants per square mile (0.27/km^{2}), it is also the least-densely populated county in Colorado. The county seat and only incorporated municipality in the county is Lake City. The county is named for George A. Hinsdale, a prominent pioneer and former Lieut. Governor of Colorado Territory.

== Geography ==
According to the U.S. Census Bureau, the county has a total area of 1,123 square miles (2,910 km^{2}), of which 1,117 square miles (2,890 km^{2}) is land and 5.9 square miles (15 km^{2}) (0.5%) is water.

Hinsdale County is one of the most remote counties in Colorado and the United States. The county is covered by mountains, including multiple fourteeners, and contains one of the largest roadless areas in the country. The continental divide crosses the county twice. Most of the county is divided among several different national forests and the Weminuche Wilderness area. The county is 96.5% public lands.

=== Adjacent counties ===
- Gunnison – north
- Saguache – northeast
- Mineral – east
- Archuleta – south
- La Plata – southwest
- San Juan – west
- Ouray – northwest

=== Major highways ===
- SH 149

== Demographics ==
Historical population
Census	Pop.	Note	%±
1880	1,487		—
1890	862		−42.0%
1900	1,609		86.7%
1910	646		−59.9%
1920	538		−16.7%
1930	449		−16.5%
1940	349		−22.3%
1950	263		−24.6%
1960	208		−20.9%
1970	202		−2.9%
1980	408		102.0%
1990	467		14.5%
2000	790		69.2%
2010	843		6.7%
2020	788		−6.5%
2025 (est.)	753	▼	−4.4%
U.S. Decennial Census; 1790-1960 1900-1990; 1990-2000 2010-2020

=== 2020 census ===
As of the 2020 census, the county had a population of 788. Of the residents, 16.6% were under the age of 18 and 32.0% were 65 years of age or older; the median age was 56.3 years. For every 100 females there were 106.8 males, and for every 100 females age 18 and over there were 106.0 males. 0.0% of residents lived in urban areas and 100.0% lived in rural areas.

Hinsdale County, Colorado – Racial and ethnic composition Note: the US Census treats Hispanic/Latino as an ethnic category. This table excludes Latinos from the racial categories and assigns them to a separate category. Hispanics/Latinos may be of any race.
Race / Ethnicity (NH = Non-Hispanic)	Pop 2000	Pop 2010	Pop 2020	% 2000	% 2010	% 2020
White alone (NH)	763	786	693	96.58%	93.24%	87.94%
Black or African American alone (NH)	0	3	8	0.00%	0.36%	1.02%
Native American or Alaska Native alone (NH)	9	7	6	1.14%	0.83%	0.76%
Asian alone (NH)	2	3	2	0.25%	0.36%	0.25%
Pacific Islander alone (NH)	0	0	1	0.00%	0.00%	0.13%
Other race alone (NH)	1	6	6	0.13%	0.71%	0.76%
Mixed race or Multiracial (NH)	3	14	42	0.38%	1.66%	5.33%
Hispanic or Latino (any race)	12	24	30	1.52%	2.85%	3.81%
Total	790	843	788	100.00%	100.00%	100.00%

The racial makeup of the county was 89.6% White, 1.0% Black or African American, 0.8% American Indian and Alaska Native, 0.4% Asian, 0.1% Native Hawaiian and Pacific Islander, 0.8% from some other race, and 7.4% from two or more races. Hispanic or Latino residents of any race comprised 3.8% of the population.

There were 375 households in the county, of which 24.5% had children under the age of 18 living with them and 17.3% had a female householder with no spouse or partner present. About 26.7% of all households were made up of individuals and 10.4% had someone living alone who was 65 years of age or older.

There were 1,329 housing units, of which 71.8% were vacant. Among occupied housing units, 76.0% were owner-occupied and 24.0% were renter-occupied. The homeowner vacancy rate was 2.3% and the rental vacancy rate was 10.3%.

=== 2000 census ===
As of the census of 2000, there were 790 people, 359 households, and 246 families living in the county. The population density was 0.7 people per square mile (0.27 people/km^{2}). There were 1,304 housing units at an average density of 1.2 units per square mile (0.46 units/km^{2}). The racial makeup of the county was 97.34% White, 1.52% Native American, 0.25% Asian, 0.38% from other races, and 0.51% from two or more races. 1.52% of the population were Hispanic or Latino of any race.

There were 359 households, out of which 23.4% had children under the age of 18 living with them, 61.0% were married couples living together, 4.7% had a female householder with no husband present, and 31.20% were non-families. 24.8% of all households were made up of individuals, and 3.1% had someone living alone who was 65 years of age or older. The average household size was 2.2 and the average family size was 2.6.

In the county, the population was spread out, with 19.5% under the age of 18, 4.7% from 18 to 24, 29.5% from 25 to 44, 34.7% from 45 to 64, and 11.6% who were 65 years of age or older. The median age was 44 years. For every 100 females there were 105.7 males. For every 100 females age 18 and over, there were 109.9 males.

The median income for a household in the county was $37,279, and the median income for a family was $42,159. Males had a median income of $26,210 versus $23,750 for females. The per capita income for the county was $22,360. About 4.5% of families and 7.2% of the population were below the poverty line, including none of those under age 18 and 2.2% of those age 65 or over.

== Politics ==
Republican presidential nominees have carried Hinsdale County since Franklin Delano Roosevelt defeated Alf Landon by eight votes in 1936. Along with Elbert County and Washington County it was one of three Colorado counties to vote for Barry Goldwater over Lyndon Johnson in 1964. In 2020, Joe Biden received the highest vote share for a Democrat since Johnson, and became the third Democrat since 1940 to breach 40% of the vote.

The last Democrat to carry Hinsdale County in a statewide election was John Hickenlooper in the 2010 gubernatorial contest, and the only other case since at least 1980 have been Democratic senator Ben “Nighthorse” Campbell, who was later to shift to the Republican Party, in 1992, alongside popular Governor Roy Romer, who carried all but three counties statewide, in 1990.

United States presidential election results for Hinsdale County, Colorado
Year	Republican		Democratic		Third party(ies)	
Year	No.	%	No.	%	No.	%
1880	421	53.84%	361	46.16%	0	0.00%
1884	245	57.11%	180	41.96%	4	0.93%
1888	158	57.66%	116	42.34%	0	0.00%
1892	412	25.81%	0	0.00%	1,184	74.19%
1896	19	2.63%	697	96.40%	7	0.97%
1900	230	27.68%	595	71.60%	6	0.72%
1904	243	47.55%	239	46.77%	29	5.68%
1908	156	38.71%	215	53.35%	32	7.94%
1912	136	38.64%	157	44.60%	59	16.76%
1916	94	31.13%	178	58.94%	30	9.93%
1920	149	59.13%	67	26.59%	36	14.29%
1924	138	50.00%	79	28.62%	59	21.38%
1928	128	53.78%	106	44.54%	4	1.68%
1932	94	38.21%	138	56.10%	14	5.69%
1936	129	47.78%	137	50.74%	4	1.48%
1940	150	58.82%	103	40.39%	2	0.78%
1944	124	67.03%	61	32.97%	0	0.00%
1948	133	63.94%	75	36.06%	0	0.00%
1952	154	74.04%	54	25.96%	0	0.00%
1956	155	76.73%	47	23.27%	0	0.00%
1960	138	62.73%	82	37.27%	0	0.00%
1964	107	53.23%	94	46.77%	0	0.00%
1968	127	66.15%	43	22.40%	22	11.46%
1972	172	77.48%	44	19.82%	6	2.70%
1976	189	66.55%	83	29.23%	12	4.23%
1980	232	69.05%	76	22.62%	28	8.33%
1984	310	74.88%	98	23.67%	6	1.45%
1988	295	72.48%	111	27.27%	1	0.25%
1992	188	39.50%	151	31.72%	137	28.78%
1996	289	52.83%	185	33.82%	73	13.35%
2000	316	55.83%	188	33.22%	62	10.95%
2004	355	58.97%	236	39.20%	11	1.83%
2008	344	57.43%	240	40.07%	15	2.50%
2012	353	58.83%	229	38.17%	18	3.00%
2016	339	57.56%	197	33.45%	53	9.00%
2020	353	55.85%	255	40.35%	24	3.80%
2024	332	54.70%	257	42.34%	18	2.97%

United States Senate election results for Hinsdale County, Colorado2
Year	Republican		Democratic		Third party(ies)	
Year	No.	%	No.	%	No.	%
2020	365	58.87%	244	39.35%	11	1.77%

United States Senate election results for Hinsdale County, Colorado3
Year	Republican		Democratic		Third party(ies)	
Year	No.	%	No.	%	No.	%
2022	272	52.61%	223	43.13%	22	4.26%

Colorado Gubernatorial election results for Hinsdale County
Year	Republican		Democratic		Third party(ies)	
Year	No.	%	No.	%	No.	%
2022	251	49.12%	246	48.14%	14	2.74%

== Recreation ==
=== National forests ===
- Gunnison National Forest
- Rio Grande National Forest
- San Juan National Forest
- Uncompahgre National Forest

=== National wilderness areas ===
- La Garita Wilderness
- Powderhorn Wilderness
- Uncompahgre Wilderness
- Weminuche Wilderness

=== Trails ===
- Colorado Trail
- Continental Divide National Scenic Trail
- West Lost Trail Creek National Recreation Trail

=== Scenic byways ===
- Alpine Loop National Scenic Back Country Byway
- Silver Thread Scenic Byway

== Communities ==
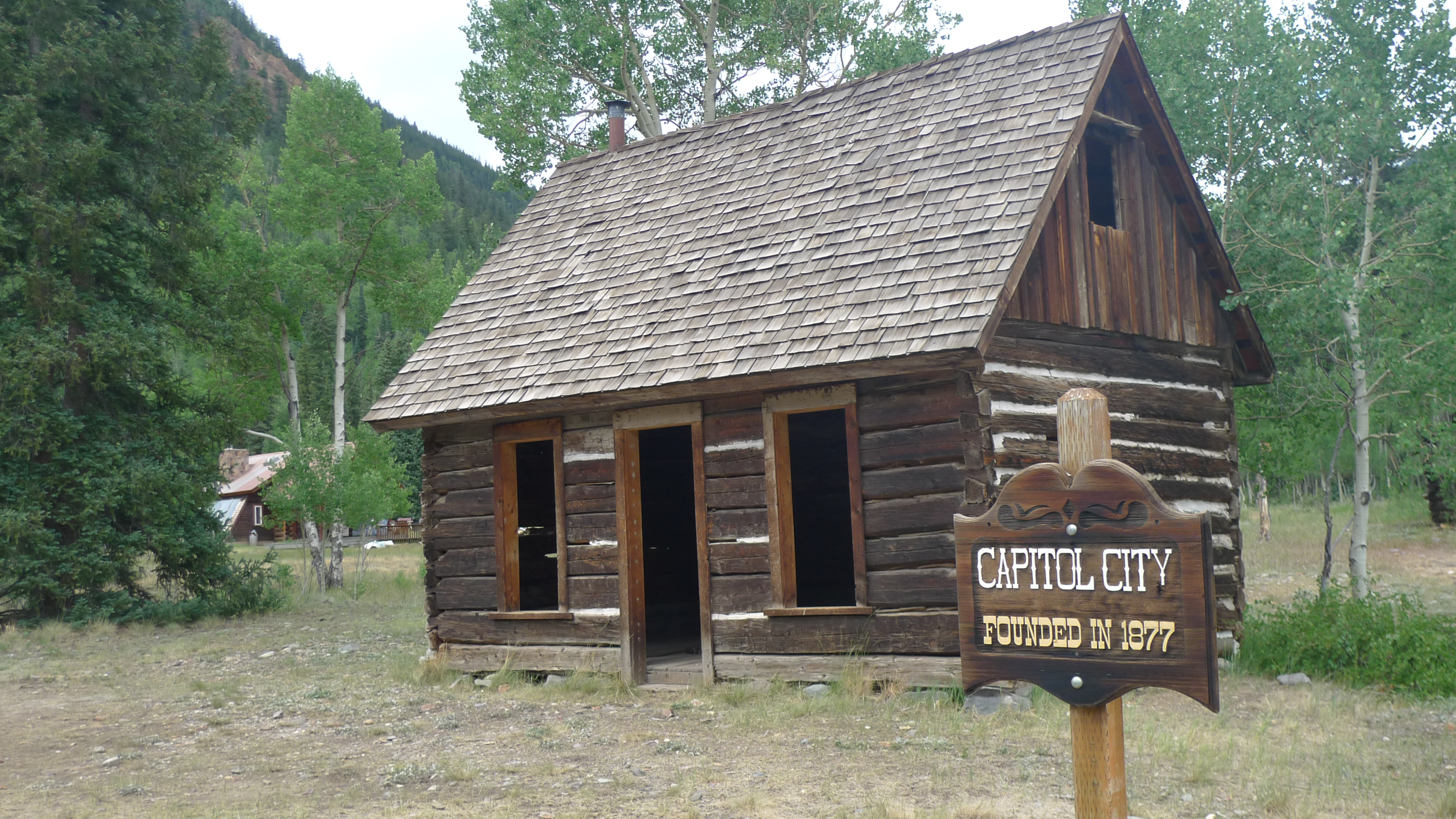
Capitol City, Colorado, a ghost town on the Alpine Loop National Scenic Back Country Byway. Capitol City once had a population of 400; its founders wanted it to become the capital of Colorado. The post office, some outbuildings, and brick kilns remain.

=== Town ===
- Lake City

=== Census-designated places ===
- Cathedral
- Piedra

=== Ghost towns ===
- Beartown
- Burrows Park
- Capitol City
- Carson
- Henson
- Old Carson

== Education ==
School districts include:

- Hinsdale County School District RE-1
- Archuleta County School District 50-JT

== See also ==
- Bibliography of Colorado
- Geography of Colorado
- History of Colorado
  - National Register of Historic Places listings in Hinsdale County, Colorado
- Index of Colorado-related articles
- List of Colorado-related lists
  - List of counties in Colorado
- Outline of Colorado
