= Atlantic Creek =

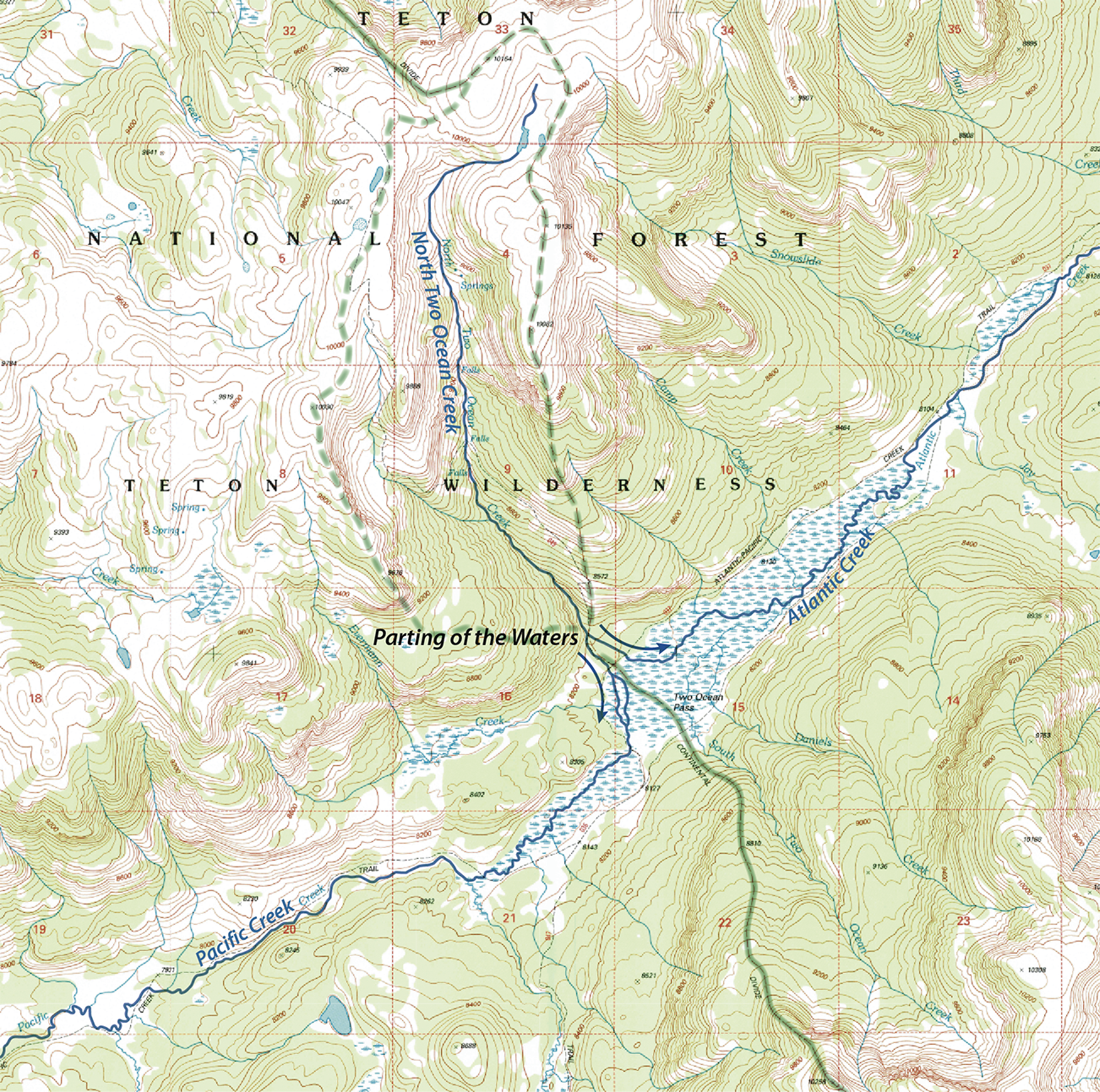
- Modified portion of the USGS Two Ocean Pass showing Atlantic Creek flowing northeast

Physical characteristics
- Source
  - location: Two Ocean Pass
  - coordinates: 44°00′58″N 110°09′23″W
  - elevation: 8,130 ft (2,480 m)
- Mouth
  - location: Confluence with Yellowstone River
  - coordinates: 44°05′56.043″N 110°06′0.6″W
  - elevation: 7,860 ft (2,400 m)

National Wild and Scenic Rivers System

Atlantic Creek is one of two rivers formed at the hydrologically unique site of the Parting of the Waters. The creek begins in the Teton Wilderness of Bridger-Teton National Forest in the U.S. state of Wyoming near the southern border of Yellowstone National Park. It originates directly on the continental divide from North Two Ocean Creek, which splits roughly in half at the Parting of the Waters. One half of the flow becomes the headwater of Atlantic Creek, while the other half becomes the source of Pacific Creek.

== Course to Atlantic Ocean ==
Atlantic Creek, as its name suggests, ultimately flows into the Atlantic Ocean 3,488 mi (5,613 km) away. From the Parting of the Waters, it flows northeast over five miles of wilderness through the alpine valley of Two Ocean Pass and ends it short run into the Yellowstone River approximately 15 mi (24 km) southeast of Yellowstone Lake.

Following the flow of water to the Atlantic Ocean, the Yellowstone River meanders north in its river plain feeding Yellowstone Lake from the south and leaving the lake's northern edge. The river continues north going over both Yellowstone Falls, through the Grand Canyon of the Yellowstone, and eventually flows into the Missouri River in far western North Dakota. From the confluence of the Yellowstone and Missouri, the Missouri flows mostly south across the Dakotas. It then forms the borders of Nebraska, Iowa, Kansas, and Missouri before finally flowing east into the Mississippi River which empties into the Gulf of Mexico in Louisiana.

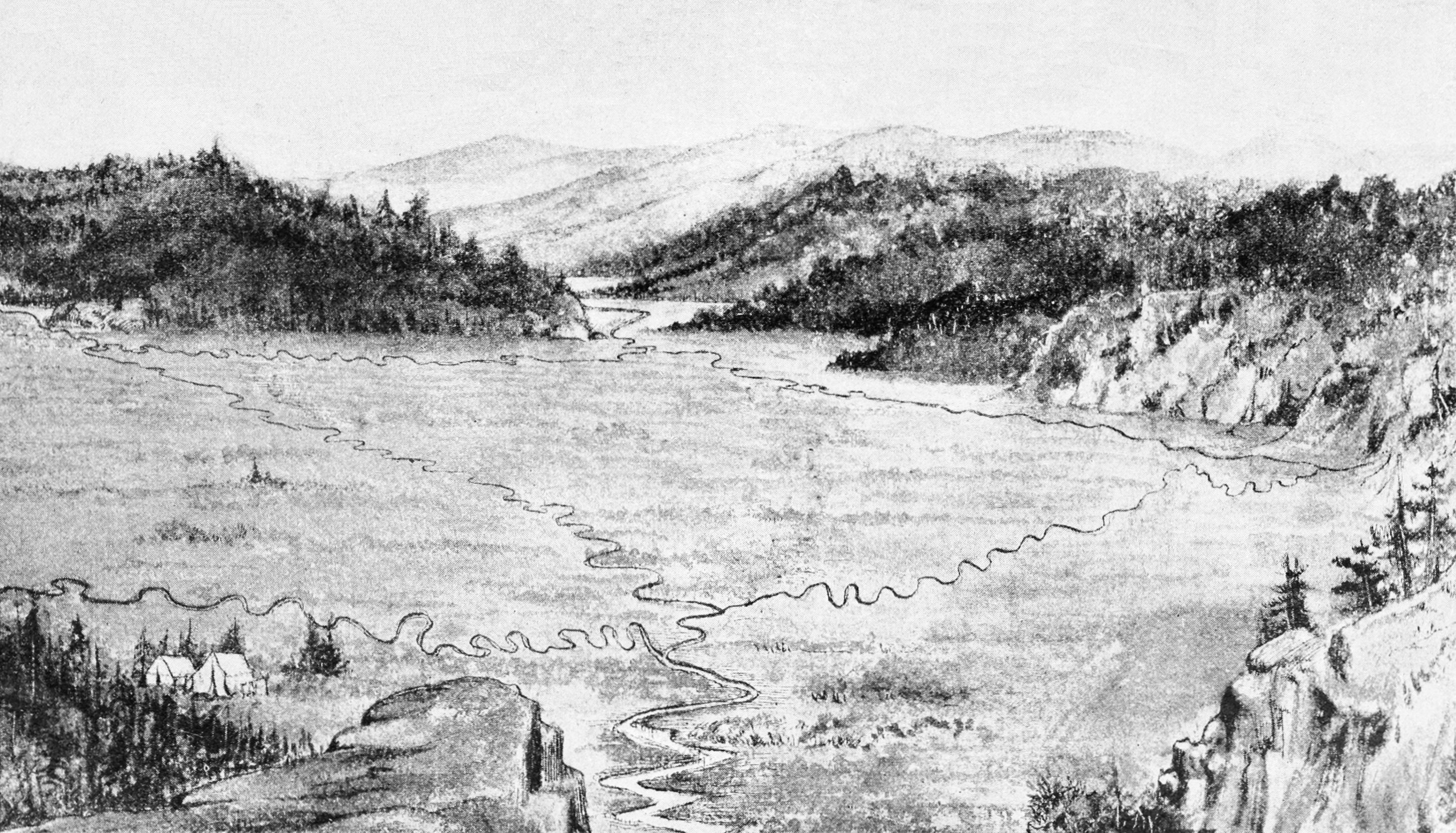
An 1894 drawing of Two Ocean Pass with a view to the northeast. Atlantic Creek exits the pass between the hills in the upper center part of the image. Pacific Creek exits to the southwest in the bottom center of the image. North Two Oceans Creek enters from the left top center of the image and divides into its two distributaries and South Two Ocean Creek enters from the right center of the image and is also shown dividing into two streams. Evermann Creek also enters the area from the west (left center, just above the tents).

Atlantic Creek's twin, Pacific Creek, takes the other half of flow from North Two Ocean Creek. It flows further than the relatively short run of Atlantic Creek, emptying at Moran, Wyoming over 20 miles to the southwest into the Snake River below Jackson Lake Dam and ultimately the Pacific Ocean 1,353 mi (2,177 km) away via the Columbia River.

== See also ==
- Divide Creek, a similarly hydrologically interesting creek in the Canadian Rocky Mountains
- Teton–Yellowstone tornado, an unusual high-altitude F4 tornado that passed to the west over Pacific Creek in 1987. Its track went northeast and ended in the Yellowstone River Valley where Atlantic Creek also empties
