= River bifurcation =

Forking of a river into its distributaries

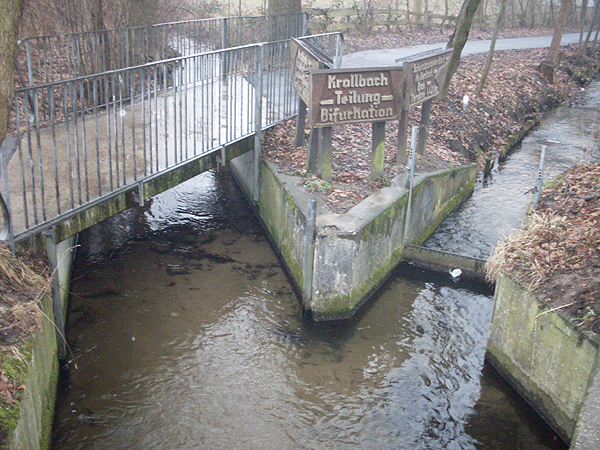
Bifurcation in Hövelhof, Germany

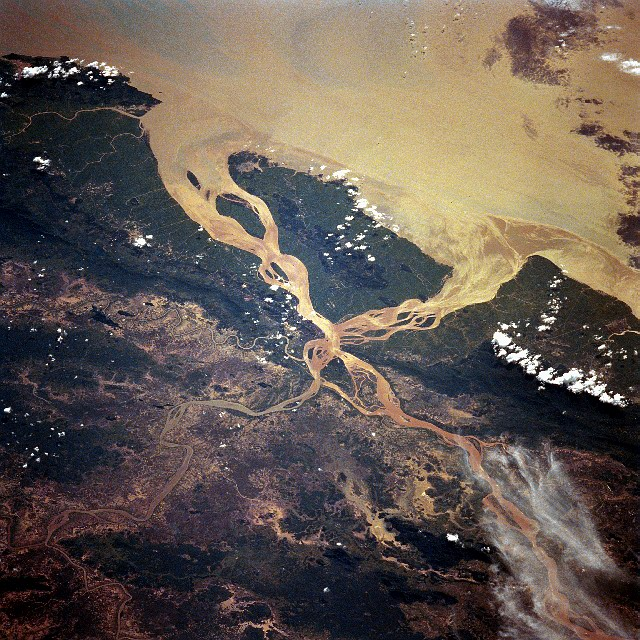
River deltas, such as the pictured delta of the Salween River in Myanmar, often show bifurcations. The water flows in from the lower section of the image and passes on both sides of the large island in the center.

River bifurcation (from Latin: furca, fork) occurs when a river (a bifurcating river) flowing in a single channel separates into two or more separate streams (called distributaries) which then continue downstream. Some rivers form complex networks of distributaries, typically in their deltas. If the streams eventually merge again or empty into the same body of water, then the bifurcation forms a river island.

River bifurcation may be temporary or semi-permanent, depending on the strength of the material that is dividing the two distributaries. For example, a mid-stream island of soil or silt in a delta is most likely temporary, due to low material strength. A location where a river divides around a rock fin, e.g. a volcanically formed dike, or a mountain, may be longer lasting as a result of higher material strength and resistance to weathering and erosion. A bifurcation may also be man-made, for example when two streams are separated by a long bridge pier.

== Occurrence ==
River bifurcation occurs in many types of rivers. It is common in meandering and braided rivers. In meandering rivers, bifurcations are often unstable in their configuration, and usually result in channel avulsion. The stability of bifurcation is dependent on the rate of flow of the river upstream as well as the sediment transport of the upper reaches of the branches just after bifurcation occurs. The evolution of bifurcation is highly dependent on the discharge of the river upstream of the bifurcation. Unstable bifurcations are bifurcations in which only one channel receives water. Within deltas, these typically create channels with relatively large widths, and are also known as channel avulsions. Stable bifurcations are bifurcations in which both channels receive water.

In deltas, the directions of distributaries resulting from bifurcation are easily changeable by processes like aggradation, or differential subsidence and compaction. The number of distributaries that are present is in part determined by the rate of sediment discharge, and increased sediment discharge leads to more river bifurcation. This then leads to increased numbers of distributaries in deltas.

Delta bifurcation has a typical angle at which it is observed, with a critical angle of approximately 72º. However, observations and experiments show that many distributary channel bifurcations do not actually exhibit a bifurcation angle of 72º, but rather grow towards this angle over time after initiation of bifurcation. This implies that bifurcations that occur in deltas are semi-permanent, as many observed channels do not exhibit this angle due to their relatively recent initiation, or because some of the channels that do reach this bifurcation angle did not last to be observed.

== Importance ==
As is the case with river confluence, bifurcation is important in dividing land and morphological areas. Rivers are abundantly used as political boundaries, marking borders between regions of opposing countries, states and peoples, among other things. Sudden river bifurcation, even temporary, can disturb terranes that would otherwise be considered the same region. Bifurcations are different from confluences in that many confluences are considered important sites for cities and trade. But due to the semi-permanence of most bifurcated rivers, and their uncommon occurrences, construction is not largely exhibited at sites of river bifurcation.

Distributaries are common components of deltas, and are the opposite of tributaries. These distributaries, that are a result of river bifurcation, are important for the deposition and movement of water, sediment and nutrients from farther inland to the larger body of water that it empties into. Deltas are very important to humans, as delta distributary regions provide homes to roughly half a billion people and are exceptionally biologically rich.

== Evolution ==
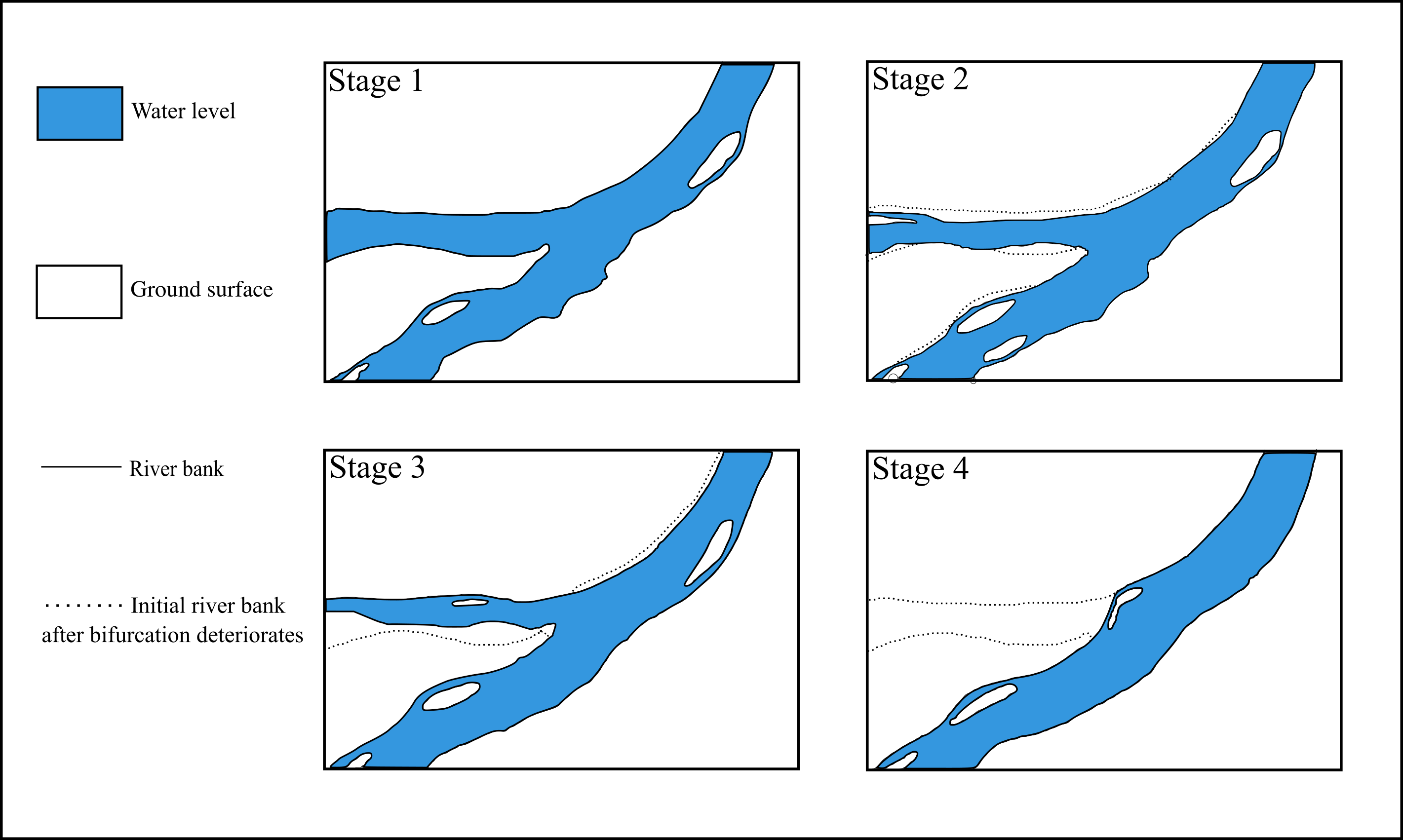
Progression of bifurcated river systems can be modeled in stages. The figure above gives a rough picture of what it would actually look like. It depicts that, gradually, a stable bifurcation will deteriorate until one of the channels no longer receives flow from upstream, thus becoming an unstable bifurcation.

Bifurcated rivers are largely semi-permanent, and are subject to constant change in their configuration from evolving terranes and flow rates. As a result of this, observation of the process by which rivers bifurcate and then gradually deteriorate has been poorly documented. The evolution of river bifurcations from single channel to multi-channeled and back again is largely dependent on discharge rate from the backwater regions of the channel. The bifurcation of channel systems begins when a single channel is forced to split when a bar of sediment causes initiation of the two channel system, however, this does not always result in a system in which both channels receive flow. In braided systems, evolution of bifurcate systems is largely determined by the water level of adjacent branches of the system. The water level differences in braided systems are themselves caused by closure of branch entrances as a result of bar growth. In addition to bar growth, differences in direction of bifurcated river flows from compound bar shapes and backwater effects also influence the evolution of the braided system.

Bifurcations move largely as a result of migration of the upstream channel. The configuration of the bifurcated system is also modified by the migration of bars within the system. This can cause sudden variations in channel widths, as well as width asymmetry in the system. Over time, the stable channel system will eventually deteriorate until only one channel receives flow from upstream, this then creates an unstable channel, one in which no flow passes through.

== Impacts ==
River bifurcations impact the surrounding area in a plethora of ways, namely, redistributing flow of water, sediment and nutrients throughout a watershed and delta. In addition to this, migrating bifurcations and landforms can alter the terranes in a given region affected by this process. Sudden bifurcation initiation can cause small scale flooding of the surrounding area. The opposite, deterioration of a stable bifurcation to an unstable one, can have similar effects, as flow that was split through two channels now being directed through one can cause the stable channel to surpass bank-full stage, or the point at which the water level is above the river bank. This can also cause flooding, and is a prominent issue in regions where levees are in use. Bifurcations are a major distributor of nutrients and mineral particulates to biologically rich areas in deltas. Sudden deterioration or initiation of bifurcated systems can disrupt the deposition of material required for various organisms to live, and thus has an indirect impact on surrounding ecosystems via flow patterns.

== Examples ==
=== North America ===
- Canada's aptly-named Divide Creek splits into two branches near Kicking Horse Pass on the Alberta–British Columbia border at the North American continental divide. One branch flows west to the Pacific Ocean; the other flows east and eventually reaches the Atlantic Ocean via Hudson Bay.
- Similarly, at Two Ocean Pass in Wyoming, United States, further south along the same continental divide, North Two Ocean Creek splits at the Parting of the Waters. One creek is called the Atlantic Creek, which flows east to the Gulf of Mexico via the Yellowstone, Missouri and Mississippi Rivers; the other is called Pacific Creek, which flows west to the Pacific Ocean via the Snake and Columbia Rivers.
- In Louisiana, the Mississippi River bifurcates into the Atchafalaya River. The Atchafalaya is 137 miles long and is the fifth largest river in North America, by discharge.
- The Kings River in the California Central Valley splits into two distributaries, of which one reaches the Pacific Ocean, with the other being endorheic.
- Slims River (extinct): In the spring of 2016 a melting glacier diverted most of the Slims River from the Bering Sea to the Gulf of Alaska watershed
- The Echimamish River in Canada connects the Hayes and Nelson rivers and was much used as a shortcut by voyageurs.

=== South America ===
- The Casiquiare canal splits off from the Orinoco (an east-flowing river in northern Venezuela that empties into the Caribbean Sea) and heads south to join the Rio Negro, an enormous south-flowing river that eventually joins the Amazon River. The canal therefore provides a navigable channel between the large Orinoco basin and the enormous Amazon basin. The resulting landmass bounded by these rivers is also known as Guiana Island.
- In Suriname, the Wayombo and Arrawarra split, the first flowing into the Coppename, the second into the Nickerie.
- Arroyo Partido, Neuquén, Argentina

=== Europe ===
- The Hase River in Melle, Germany divides into the Hase River and the Else River and has been researched as a natural phenomenon.
- A bifurcation of the Nerodime River in Kosovo, near the town of Ferizaj, at 42.371827°N 21.133306°E, was a hydrological curiosity as separate streams flowed into the Aegean and the Black Sea. The Nerodime bifurcation was the first hydrological protected object in the former Yugoslavia (1979). The Nerodime bifurcation is a strict wildlife sanctuary, category I according to IUCN, with an area of 13.0 ha (about 32 acres). This bifurcation is considered to be an artificial phenomenon, but created under extremely favorable natural conditions.
- In the past, the small Kalaus River in south-western Russia, when reaching the thalweg of the Kuma-Manych Depression at 45°43′N 44°06′E, would split, the two distributaries becoming the headwaters of the West and East Manych Rivers. The former flows west into the Don River and eventually into the Sea of Azov, while the latter flows east, and is lost in the steppe before ever reaching the Caspian Sea. However a dam was built, preventing water from flowing from the Kalaus into the East Manych; thus the Kalaus is now the source of the West Manych only.
- The Swedish side of Torne River has a distributary called the Tärendö River, which on average transports 57% of the water of the Torne River into the Kalix River.
- In The Netherlands, the IJssel is a distributary of the Rhine. With a length of around 127 kilometers, it is the longest river to start and end within The Netherlands. Unlike the Rhine, which flows into the North Sea, it flows into the IJsselmeer.

=== Africa ===
- The Bahr Yussef is a channel which splits off the west side of the Nile and drains into the Birket Qarun, an inland sea in the Fayum Depression. Originally a natural bifurcation for flood waters, its flow was increased by canalisation in the 12th Dynasty (about 1900 BC). Around 230 BC, the channel of the Nile from which it came (itself a bifurcation) dried up, but has since been fed by a new canal to allow water again to make it from the Nile to Al Fayyum. The entire waterway is over 300 km long, consisting of modern canals taking Nile water from Asyut to Dairut, the old Nile channel then runs alongside the Nile for over 150 km to Lahun, then the Ancient Egyptian canal carries the water into the Fayum Depression.
- The Selinda Spillway of the Cuando River of Angola, Namibia and Botswana

=== Asia ===
- The Barak River splits into two major rivers at the India-Bangladesh border.
- The Karnali River bifurcates in Nepal and the two parts rejoin after flowing into India for 80 kilometers.
- The Chu River in Kyrgyzstan flows east to within a few kilometres of Lake Issyk-Kul, makes a hairpin turn, and flows west without entering the lake. During floods, water from the river previously flowed into the lake, but this has not happened since the Orto-Tokoy Reservoir was built.
- In Japan, the Edo River bifurcates just north of Sekiyado Castle from the Tone River, with the Edo flowing south into Tokyo Bay and the Tone going east into the Pacific Ocean.

== See also ==
- Bifurcation lake
- Distributary
- Interbasin transfer
