= Parting of the Waters =

Naturally occurring tourist attraction in Wyoming

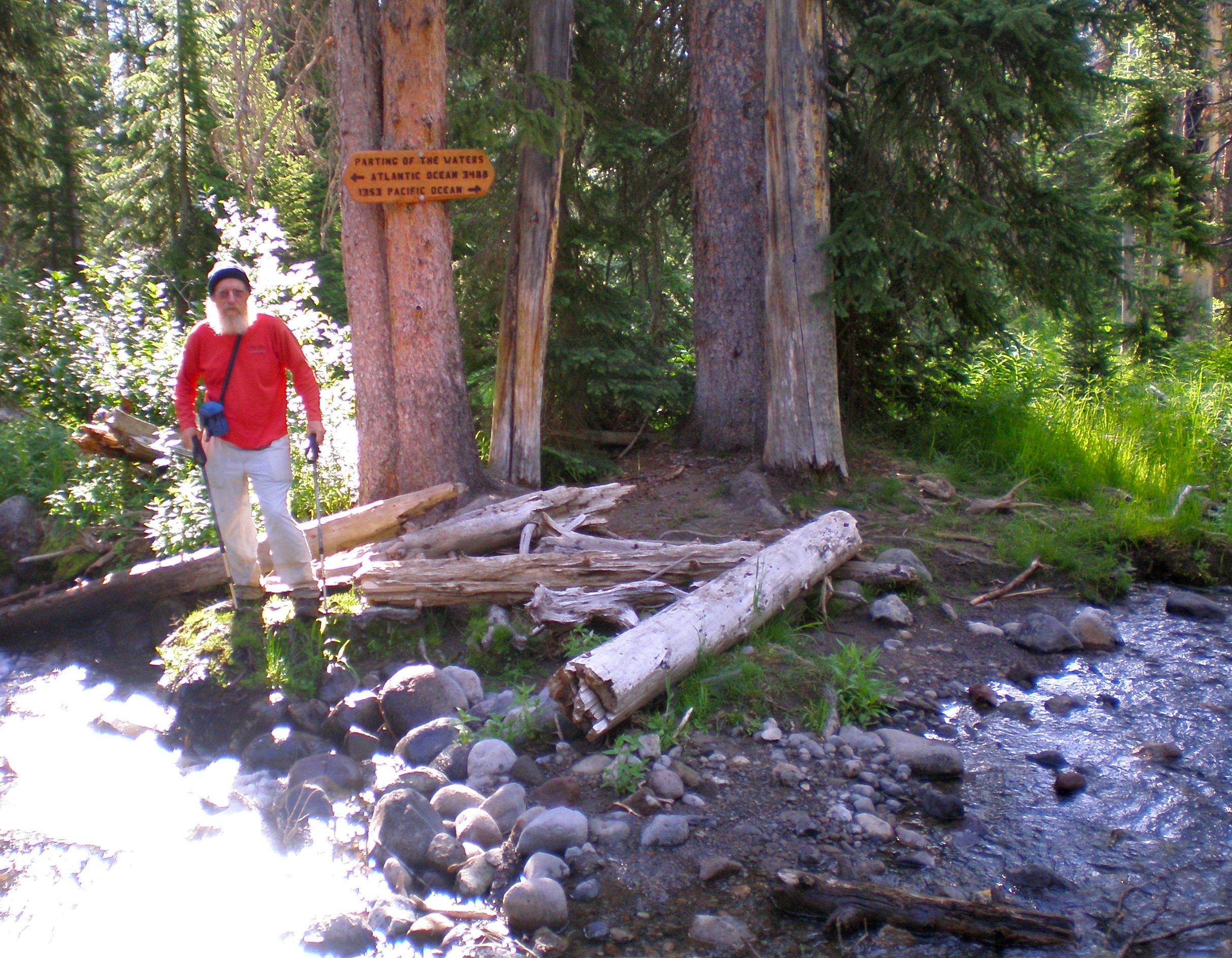
The parting of the waters

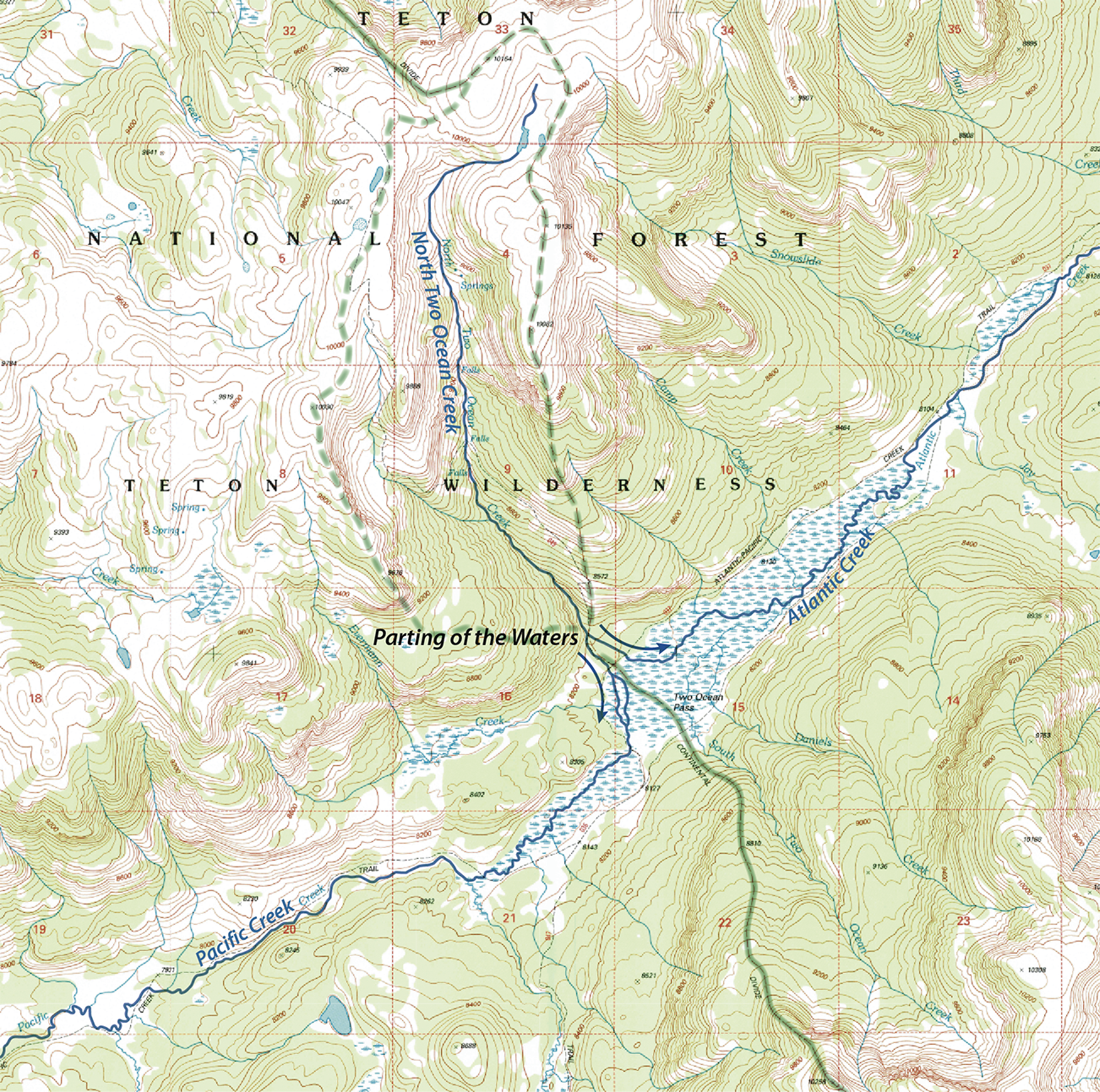
Topographic map showing Two Ocean Pass and the Continental Divide (green)

Parting of the Waters is an unusual hydrologic site near Two Ocean Pass on the Great Divide, within the Teton Wilderness Area of Bridger-Teton National Forest, Wyoming, United States. Two Ocean Pass separates the headwaters of Pacific Creek, which flows west to the Pacific Ocean, and Atlantic Creek, which flows east to the Atlantic Ocean. Parting of the Waters is located at 44°02.571′N 110°10.524′W.

== History ==
In 1965, this site received designation as a National Natural Landmark, bearing the official name of "Two Ocean Pass National Natural Landmark".

== Geography ==
North Two Ocean Creek flows down from its drainage on the side of Two Ocean Plateau, and divides its waters roughly equally between its two distributaries, Pacific Creek and Atlantic Creek. From this Y-shaped split, North Two Ocean Creek waters flow either 3,488 miles (5,613 km) to the Gulf of Mexico via Atlantic Creek and the Yellowstone, Missouri and Mississippi Rivers, or 1,353 miles (2,177 km) to the Pacific via Pacific Creek and the Snake and Columbia Rivers. Inasmuch as North Two Ocean Creek splits into streams that flow separately to the Atlantic and Pacific Oceans, the entire drainage of North Two Ocean Creek lies within an area that makes up the "Continental Divide" at this place.

At Parting of the Waters, it has been said that a fish could literally swim over the Continential Divide, coming up one creek, crossing the Divide at Parting of the Waters, then going back down the other. Admittedly, the fish could use an easier route to swim over the Continental Divide in the marshy waters covering the Divide at nearby Two Ocean Pass, 0.4 miles (0.6 km) southeast of Parting of the Waters. However, the hydrologic uniqueness of Parting of the Waters is that the Continental Divide sits precisely at the Y-shaped separation point of two flowing distributaries, Atlantic and Pacific Creeks, whereas other lakes and marshes that drain into two sides of the Continental Divide, such as Two Ocean Pass and Isa Lake in Yellowstone National Park, or Canada's Committee's Punch Bowl (Pacific and Arctic drainages) are somewhat more common. Notably, it is thought that Two Ocean Pass provided the route for Yellowstone cutthroat trout to migrate from the Snake River (Pacific) drainage to the Yellowstone River (Atlantic) drainage.

== See also ==
- Divide Creek, in the Canadian Rocky Mountains
- Danube Sinkhole, bifurcation along the European watershed
- Isa Lake, in Yellowstone National Park, in the U.S. state of Wyoming, which straddles the continental divide at Craig Pass
- Northwest Passage, navigable inland route between Atlantic and Pacific drainages in North America
- Committee's Punch Bowl, a tarn which flows into both the Arctic and Pacific Oceans

== Bibliography ==
- "National Natural Landmarks". Nature.nps.gov. July 21, 2008. Archived from the original on September 21, 2008.
