= Tornadoes of 1987 =

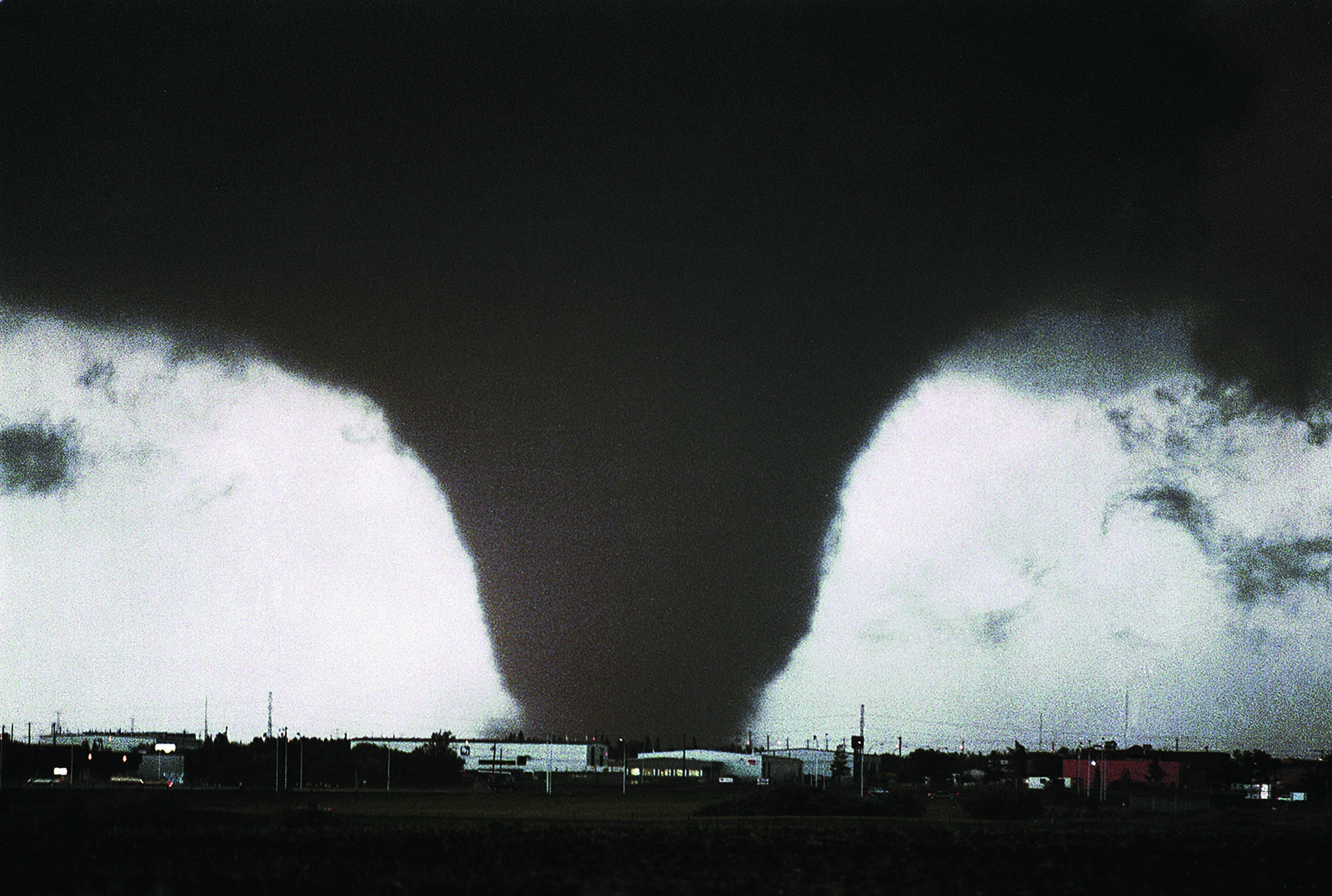
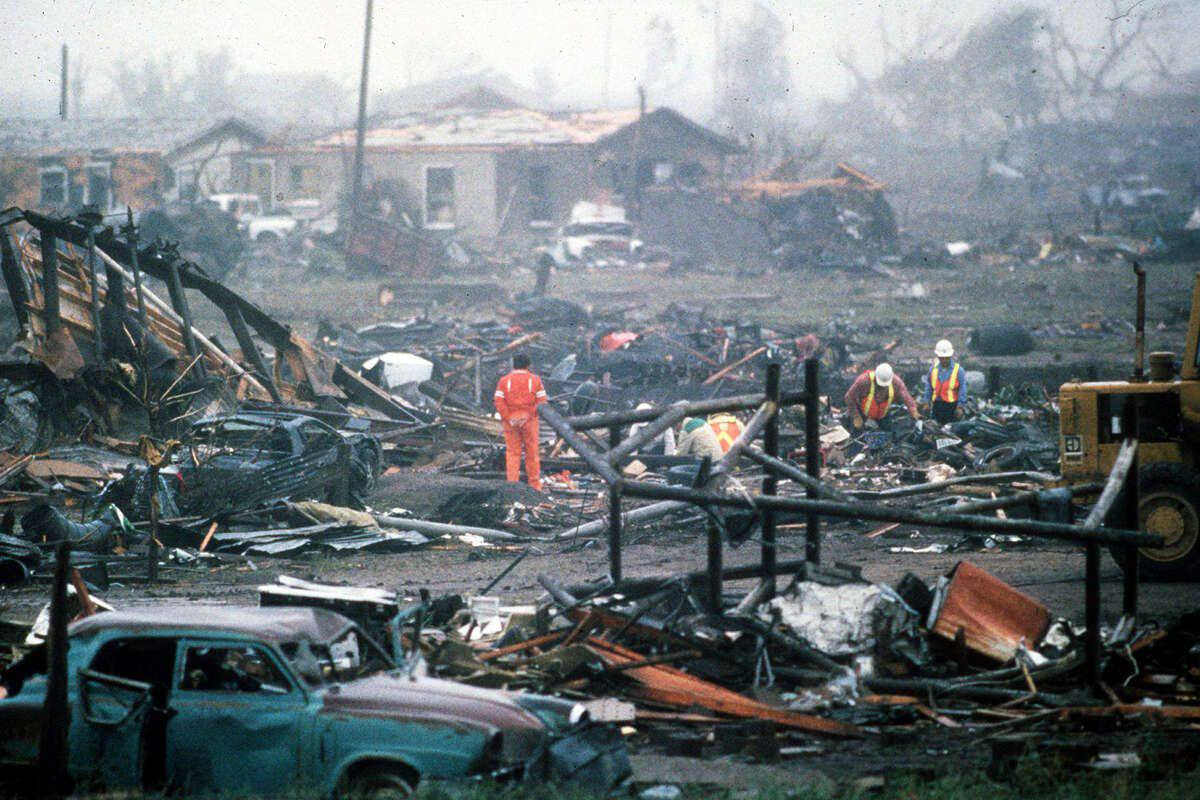
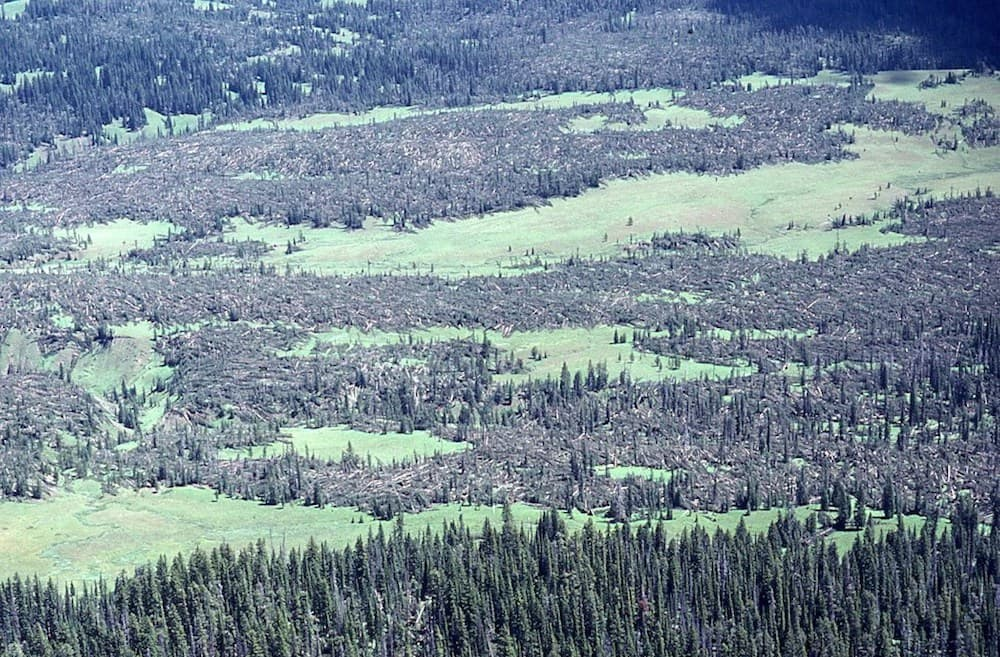
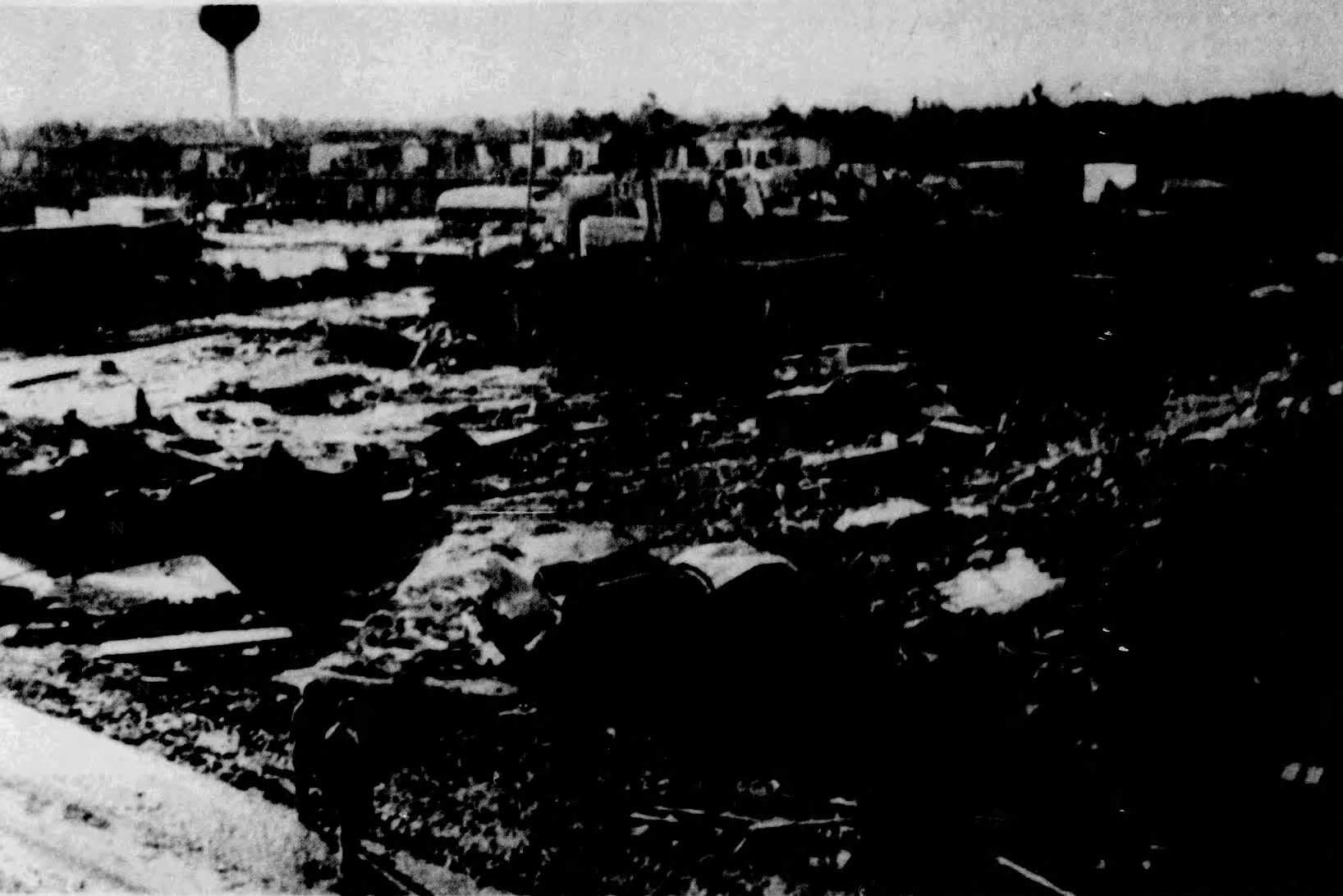
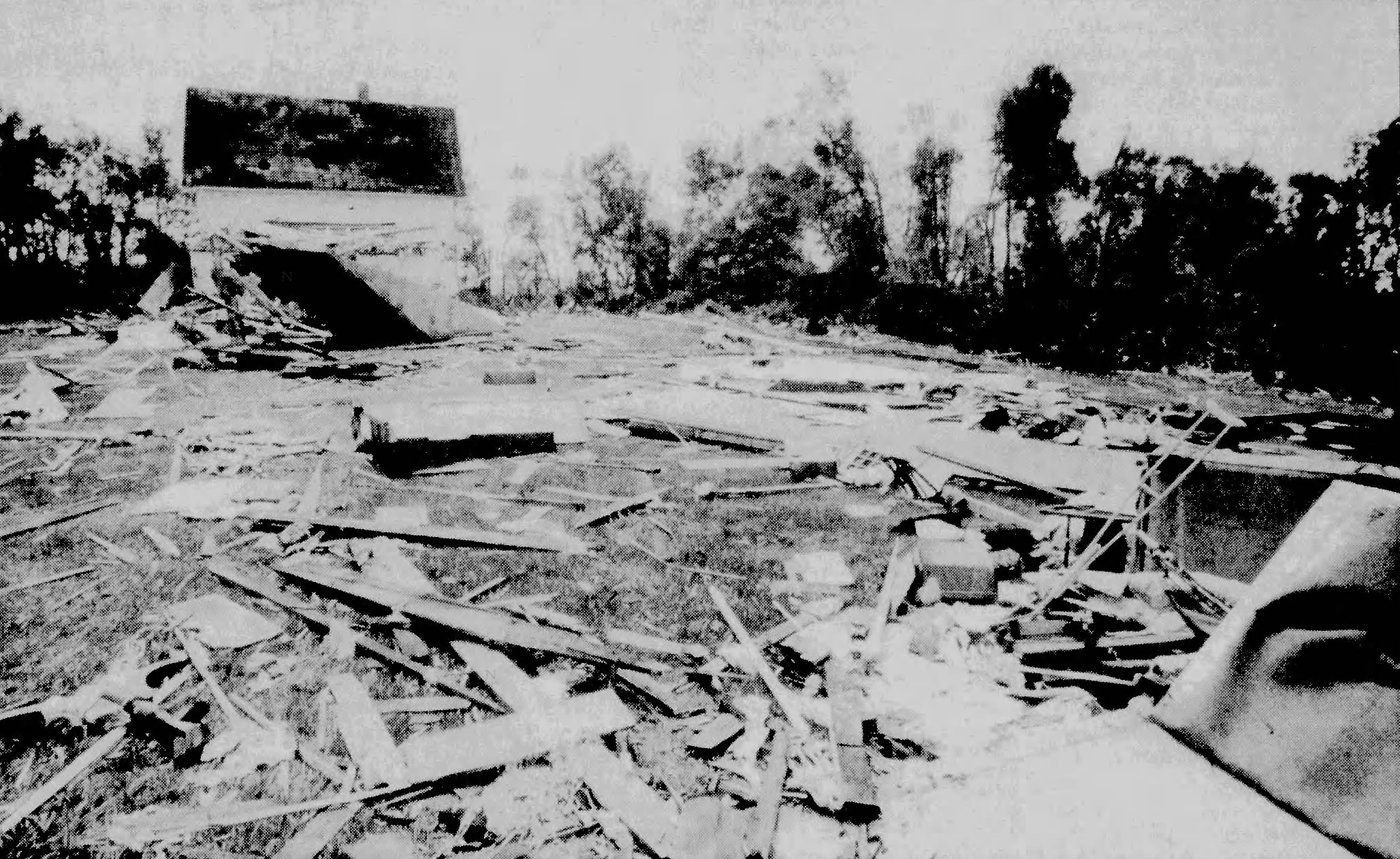
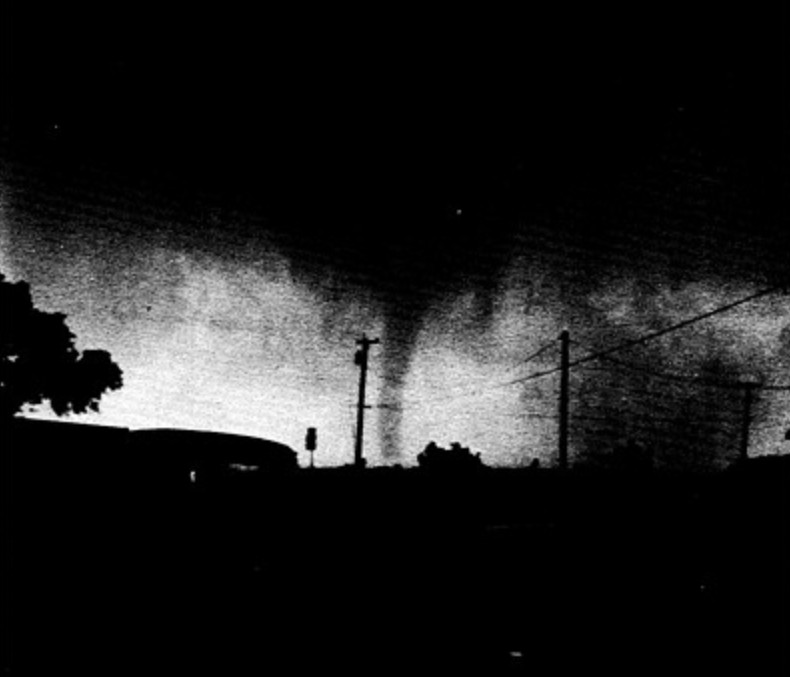
- Clockwise from top: A large and deadly F4 tornado as seen in Edmonton, Alberta on July 31; A large swath of trees downed by an F4 tornado in Teton Wilderness on July 21; A home near Aneta, North Dakota after an F3 tornado on July 21; An F4 tornado approaching Saragosa, Texas on May 22; A view of West Memphis, Arkansas after an F3 tornado on December 14; The center of Saragosa, Texas following a deadly F4 tornado on May 22.
- Timespan: January–December 1987
Maximum rated tornado
F4 tornado
- List
  – Moselle, Mississippi
  on February 28
  – Saragosa, Texas
  on May 22
  – Teton-Yellowstone, Wyoming
  on July 21
  – Edmonton, Alberta
  on July 31
  – Keshan County, China
  on July 31
  – Hailun, China
  on July 31
- Tornadoes in U.S.: 656
- Damage (U.S.): $407 million (1987 USD)
- Fatalities (U.S.): 59
- Fatalities (worldwide): >86

This page documents the tornadoes and tornado outbreaks of 1987, primarily in the United States. While most tornadoes occur in the U.S., some events also took place internationally. Tornado statistics for older years like 1987 often appear lower than those of modern years due to fewer reports or confirmed tornadoes.

== Synopsis ==
Fatal United States tornadoes in 1987
- Approximate touchdown location of killer tornadoes in 1987 Summary of tornadoes: February 28 – Mississippi (6 deaths); March 17 – Texas (1 death); April 15 – Florida (1 death); May 21 – Alabama (1 death); May 22 – Texas (30 deaths); June 11 – Texas (1 death); June 21 – Michigan (1 death); August 15 – Minnesota (1 death); November 15 – Texas (2 deaths); November 15 – Texas (3 deaths); November 15 – Texas (1 death); November 15 – Texas (4 deaths); November 15 – Texas, Louisiana (1 death); December 14 – Arkansas, Tennessee (6 deaths); Total fatalities: 59

1987 began with a relatively slow spring, but activity increased significantly during the late spring and summer. Two of the most devastating tornadoes that year were the May 22 Saragosa, Texas tornado and the July 31 Edmonton, Alberta tornado. The fall and early winter were marked by average tornado activity, including a notable outbreak on November 14–15 and a deadly F3 tornado in December.

== Events ==
Confirmed tornado total for the entire year 1987 in the United States.

Confirmed tornadoes by Fujita rating
FU	F0	F1	F2	F3	F4	F5	Total
0	340	239	62	12	3	0	656

== January ==
There were 6 tornadoes confirmed in the US in January.

== February ==
There were 19 tornadoes confirmed in the US in February.

=== February 28 ===
An F4 tornado touched down near Moselle, Mississippi and grew to a width of 2 miles (3.2 km) as it passed near Laurel. The tornado traveled a distance of 40 miles (64 km) killing six people, injuring 350 others, and causing $28.5 million in damages.

== March ==
There were 38 tornadoes confirmed in the US in March.

=== March 22 ===
A small outbreak of nine tornadoes occurred in Oklahoma, Texas, and Kansas. Including a quarter-mile wide F3 tornado in Lipscomb County, Texas, which narrowly missed the communities of Locust Grove and Lipscomb.

== April ==
There were 20 tornadoes confirmed in the US in April.

== May ==
There were 126 tornadoes confirmed in the US in May.

=== May 22 ===
On the evening of May 22, a short-lived but powerful F4 tornado struck Saragosa, Texas killing 30 people and injuring over 100. Many were killed attending a graduation ceremony for pre-school children at the Catholic Hall of Our Lady of Guadalupe Church. 80% of the residential area was reported as destroyed.

=== May 25 ===
A tornado outbreak occurred in Texas, including two F3 tornadoes. The first F3 touched down in Hansford County, Texas, just south of the community of Gruver, where it damaged outbuilding and trees, before it went onto damage a hangar at Gruver Municipal Airport. The second F3 touched down in Ochiltree County, where it had a brief but damaging path, with a max width of 0.4 miles wide, the tornado afflicted damage in Waka, due to missile-like debris.

== June ==
There were 132 tornadoes confirmed in the US.

=== June 5 ===
A tornado in Idaho caused three injuries, the highest number of tornado related injuries for the state.

A tornado in Los Angeles County, California causes approximately $25 Million in damages as the most destructive the state has seen. No deaths or injuries were reported.

=== June 16 (Poland) ===
A tornado hit the city of Białystok, the largest city in northeastern Poland, and destroyed 100 homes.

=== June 18 ===
An F2 tornado hit Casper, Wyoming and caused $250,000 in damage, making it the most destructive tornado to hit the city.

== July ==
There were 163 tornadoes confirmed in the US in July.

=== July 6 ===
An F2 tornado touched down in northwest Morocco, Indiana, destroying multiple homes and a community swimming pool, causing $2,500,000 in damage.

=== July 11 ===
A tornado outbreak occurred on July 11, mainly effecting the states of Minnesota, and Michigan, primarily the Upper Peninsula of Michigan. The main attraction of the event touched down in Dickinson County, which was rated F3, it maintained a consistent damage path through the wilderness near Vulcan, blocking roads, and destroying a fire building. After crossing into Menominee County, the tornado damaged outbuildings and a house in an isolated location was destroyed in northern Menominee County. The tornado then moved into Delta County, where it continued to chew through trees. The tornado then entered a farming area, where it was seen by at least 15 people, some of which described it "like a thousand tires stacked up, burning and smoking." In that area a large barn was moved off its foundation, and the tornado continued into a wooded area, where it dissipated.

=== July 21 ===
A rare high-altitude tornado struck Wyoming, uprooting over one million trees along its 24-mile path. The tornado was rated F4, and is among the most violent high-altitude tornadoes ever recorded.

=== July 23 ===
An intense F3 tornado struck Maple Grove, Minnesota, where it completely destroyed 14 homes and damaged 298 others.

=== July 31 (Canada) ===
In Edmonton, Alberta, an F4 tornado remained on the ground for an hour, cutting a swath of destruction 30.8 kilometres (19.1 mi) long and up to 1,300 metres (0.81 mi) wide in places. The tornado killed 27 people and injured over 300 more.

=== July 31 (China) ===
An outbreak of tornadoes occurred in northeastern China, including an estimated F4 that hit Keshan County, Heilongjiang. The tornado killed 1 person and injured 29 others.

== August ==
There were 63 tornadoes confirmed in the US in August.

== September ==
There were 19 tornadoes confirmed in the US in September.

== October ==
There was 1 tornado confirmed in the US in October.

== November ==
There were 55 tornadoes confirmed in the US in November.

=== November 15–16 ===
A large outbreak struck the Ark-La-Tex region, spawning 50 tornadoes (four rated as high as F3). There were 11 fatalities, 10 of which were in Texas.

== December ==
There were 14 tornadoes confirmed in the US in December.

=== December 14 ===
An F3 tornado struck West Memphis, Arkansas, before crossing the Mississippi River into Tennessee, causing 21 injuries in the Northhaven housing complex. In total, this storm caused six fatalities and 121 injuries. It was part of a small outbreak of five tornadoes.

== See also ==
- Tornado
  - Tornadoes by year
  - Tornado records
  - Tornado climatology
  - Tornado myths
- List of tornado outbreaks
  - List of F5 and EF5 tornadoes
  - List of North American tornadoes and tornado outbreaks
  - List of 21st-century Canadian tornadoes and tornado outbreaks
  - List of European tornadoes and tornado outbreaks
  - List of tornadoes and tornado outbreaks in Asia
  - List of Southern Hemisphere tornadoes and tornado outbreaks
  - List of tornadoes striking downtown areas
- Tornado intensity
  - Fujita scale
  - Enhanced Fujita scale
