= 1987 Saragosa tornado =

Tornado in Texas, United States

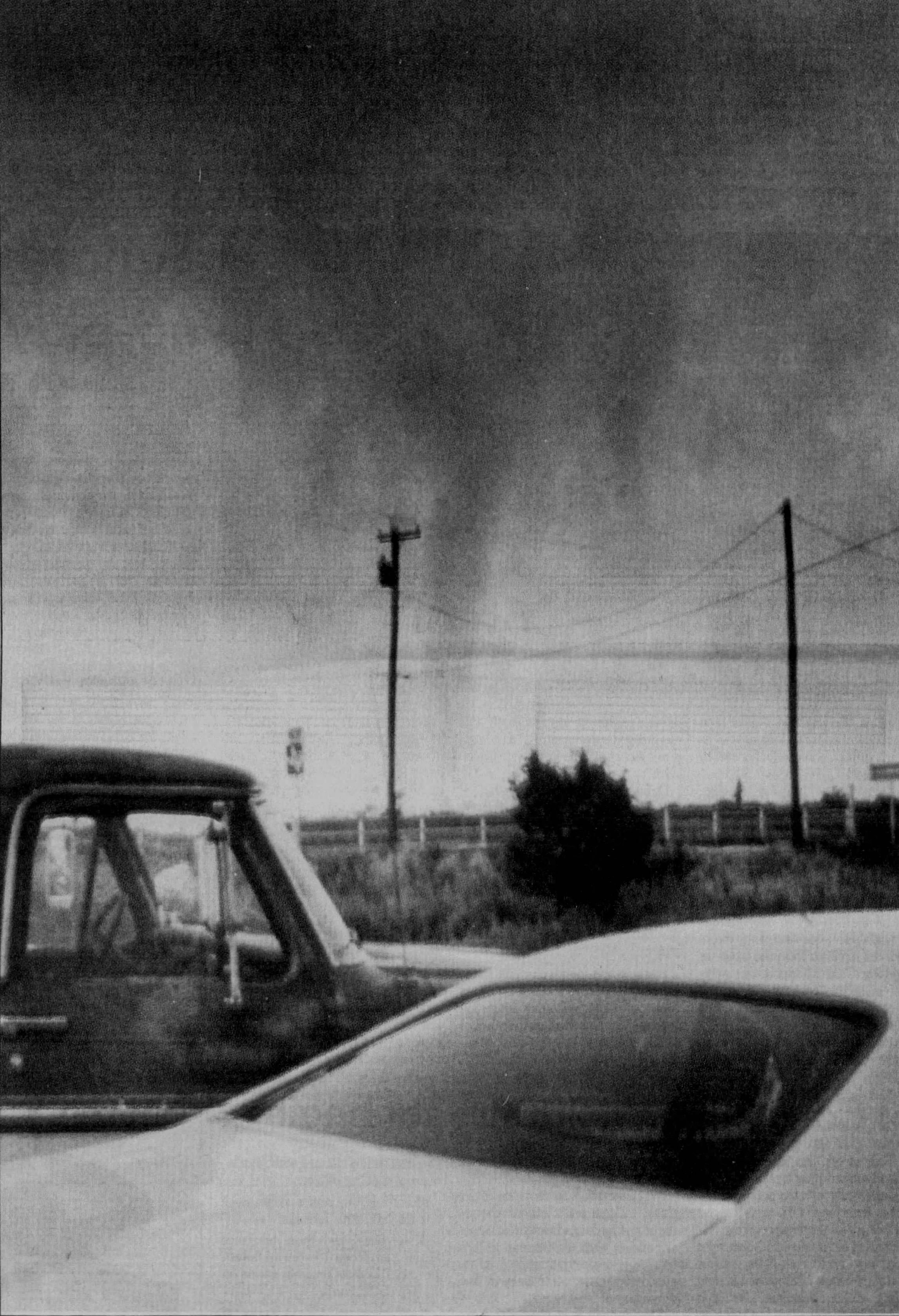
- The Saragosa tornado shortly after formation.

Meteorological history
- Date: May 22, 1987
- Formed: May 22, 1987, 8:16 p.m. CDT (UTC−05:00)
- Dissipated: May 22, 1987, 8:20 p.m. CDT (UTC−05:00)
- Duration: 4 minutes

F4 tornado
- on the Fujita scale
- Max width: 880 yd (800 m)
- Path length: 3 miles (4.8 km)
- Highest winds: 207–260 mph (333–418 km/h)

Overall effects
- Fatalities: 30
- Injuries: ~121
- Damage: $1.4 million (1987 USD)
- Areas affected: Saragosa, Texas
- Part of the tornado outbreaks of 1987

The 1987 Saragosa tornado was a short lived, yet deadly tornado that hit the small unincorporated community of Saragosa in Reeves County, Texas, on May 22, 1987. The tornado destroyed much of the town, killing at least 30 people and injuring over 100 others.

== Storm event ==
Confirmed tornadoes by Fujita rating
FU	F0	F1	F2	F3	F4	F5	Total
0	3	0	0	0	1	0	4

The storm that was responsible for the Saragosa tornado developed during the late afternoon north of Balmorhea and had very little motion for several hours, moving only slightly across southwestern Texas. By the early evening, it acquired supercellular characteristics, and cloud tops reached 60,000 feet high. A tornado warning was issued for Reeves County before 8:00 p.m. after a wall cloud was spotted, and a brief tornado touched down near Balmorhea at 8:10 p.m.

At 8:16 p.m., another tornado touched down just east of Balmorhea, about 2 miles (3.2 km) from Saragosa, north of Interstate 10. Initially, it destroyed farms and outbuildings prior to evolving into a large multiple vortex tornado. It intensified sharply into a violent F4 tornado before entering Saragosa. Twenty-two people were killed inside the Catholic Hall of Our Lady of Guadalupe Church, where a graduation ceremony for pre-schoolers was taking place. Eight others were killed elsewhere across the town, including one inside a car.

The worst of the damage occurred inside most of the business and residential areas. Trees were debarked and homes were reduced to their foundations. Eighty percent of the town was destroyed. In addition to Catholic Hall, 118 homes, the post office, a grocery store, two churches and a school were also heavily damaged or destroyed. Damage was estimated at $1.4 million. The path length of the tornado was nearly 3 miles (4.8 km) long and about 880 yards (800 meters) wide.

== Aftermath ==
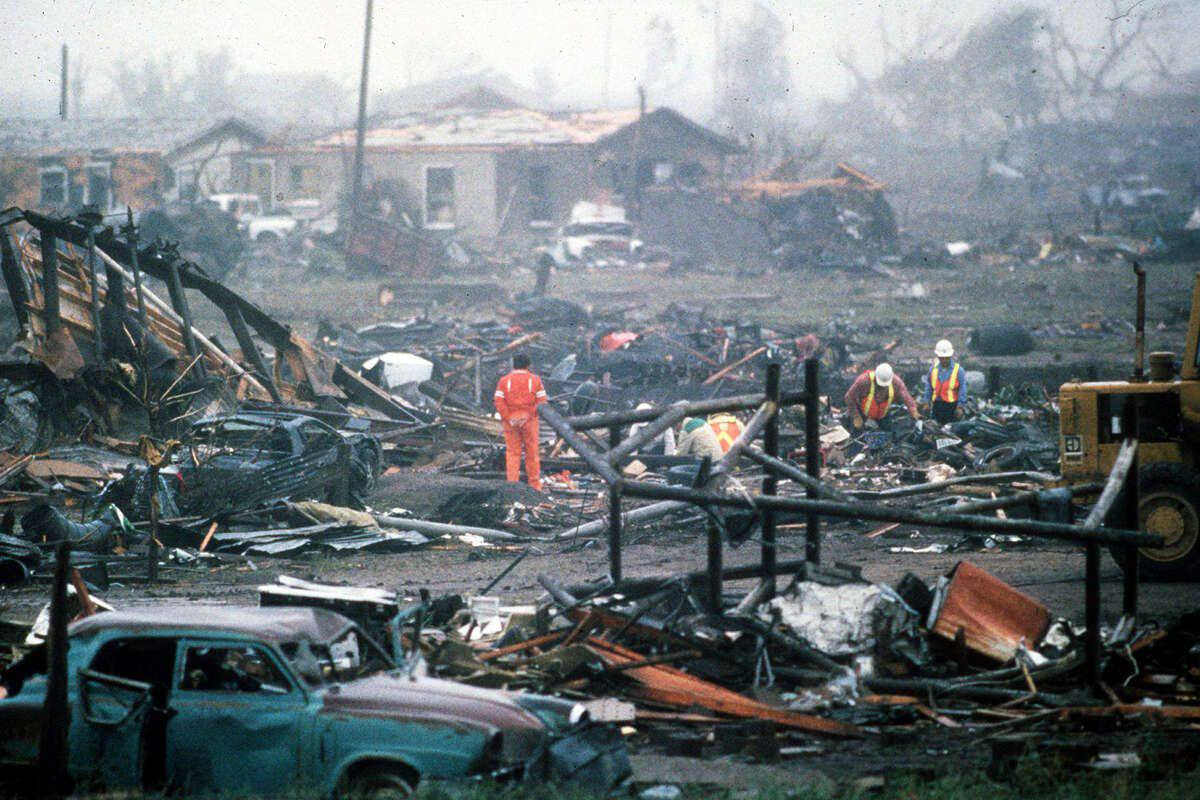
The center of Saragosa after the tornado

The Saragosa tornado was a well-predicted event: a severe thunderstorm watch had been issued for Reeves County at 3:45 p.m. CDT, followed by a tornado warning at 7:54 p.m. CDT – at least 21 minutes prior to the violent tornado hitting the community of Saragosa. Local storm spotter TV and radio stations based in Midland, Odessa and Pecos rebroadcast the warnings in Spanish and English, but many residents in the affected region (over 100 miles to the southwest) did not receive them. The town was not equipped with a siren, did not have its own police or firefighters, and as many as 50% of residents did not own their own TV or radio; those who did generally preferred Spanish-language stations based in Mexico (which did not provide weather alerts).

Ultimately, the town's first awareness of the danger came when a parent (arriving late for the graduation ceremony) spotted the tornado bearing down on Saragosa from the west and interrupted the ceremony at Catholic Hall to give a warning in Spanish. The crowd of children and their respective families, estimated to be about 100 people—or about 25% of Saragosa's total population at the time—immediately took cover. As the only concrete block building in town, the town hall/community center would have been considered a relatively safe haven under such circumstances, but it was unable to withstand a direct hit from a violent F4 tornado, collapsing with the loss of 22 lives, a fatality rate of roughly 22% (not uncommon for F4 tornadoes).

In the years following the tornado, the Catholic Hall and the community center/town hall ("Saragosa Multi-Purpose Center") were rebuilt in the center of town along Hwy. 17 with steel-reinforced masonry construction designed to survive an F4 tornado, and a storm shelter was also installed under one wing of the new community center. The town's housing quality has stayed the same, given its continued role as primarily a home for poor Mexican-American agricultural workers; very few houses were rebuilt along the SW/NE damage path through town, with most displaced residents moving in with family or relocating to Pecos, Texas or other nearby farming communities.

== Historical perspective ==
With 30 fatalities, the Saragosa tornado was the deadliest tornado in the United States during the 1980s. It was also the deadliest tornado in Texas and the U.S. as a whole since the Wichita Falls tornado in 1979, which killed 42 people. During the following years, it was surpassed by the Oak Grove-Birmingham tornado in 1998 and the Bridge Creek-Moore tornado in 1999 that killed 32 and 36 people, respectively. The Plainfield tornado in 1990 killed nearly as many as the Saragosa event, as did the Jarrell tornado in 1997.

It was the ninth-deadliest tornado in the state of Texas between the Zephyr tornado in 1909 and the Lubbock Tornado in 1970. The community was also destroyed in 1938 by a tornado and was later rebuilt slightly to the southwest.

== See also ==
- List of North American tornadoes and tornado outbreaks
