= Divide Creek =

Unusual creek in the Canadian Rockies

Coordinates: 51°26′54.2″N 116°17′05.4″W

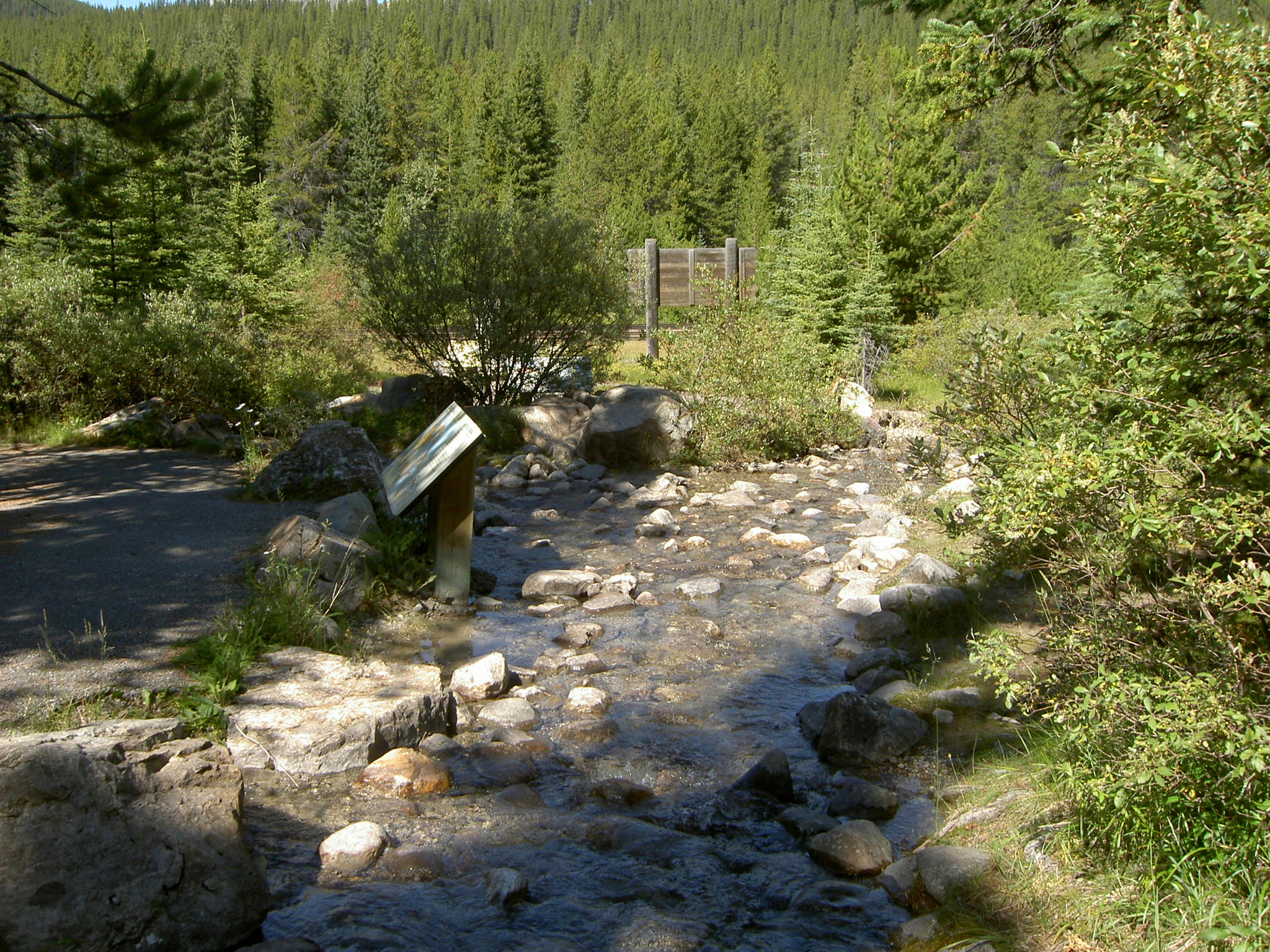
Great Divide Creek, West flows to Pacific, East flows to Arctic

Divide Creek is a short creek near Kicking Horse Pass on the British Columbia/Alberta border (also the border between Yoho National Park and Banff National Park). After following the Continental Divide of the Americas for a short distance, the creek forks, with one side draining through the Bow River east to Hudson Bay and the Arctic Ocean, and the other side draining west to the Pacific Ocean by way of the Kicking Horse River.

Camping and horseback riding are available at Divide Creek. The Divide Warden Cabin is near the bank of the creek in Banff, because of its historical associations, and its architectural and environmental value has been classified as a Recognized Federal Heritage Building.

== See also ==
- Committee's Punch Bowl, a lake on the British Columbia/Alberta border 167 km northwest of Divide Creek, which also drains to both sides of the Continental Divide.
- Two Ocean Pass/Parting of the Waters, Wyoming, where Two Ocean Creek divides into Atlantic and Pacific distributaries.
- The official location and name information available in the Canadian Geographical Names Database
