= Isa Lake =

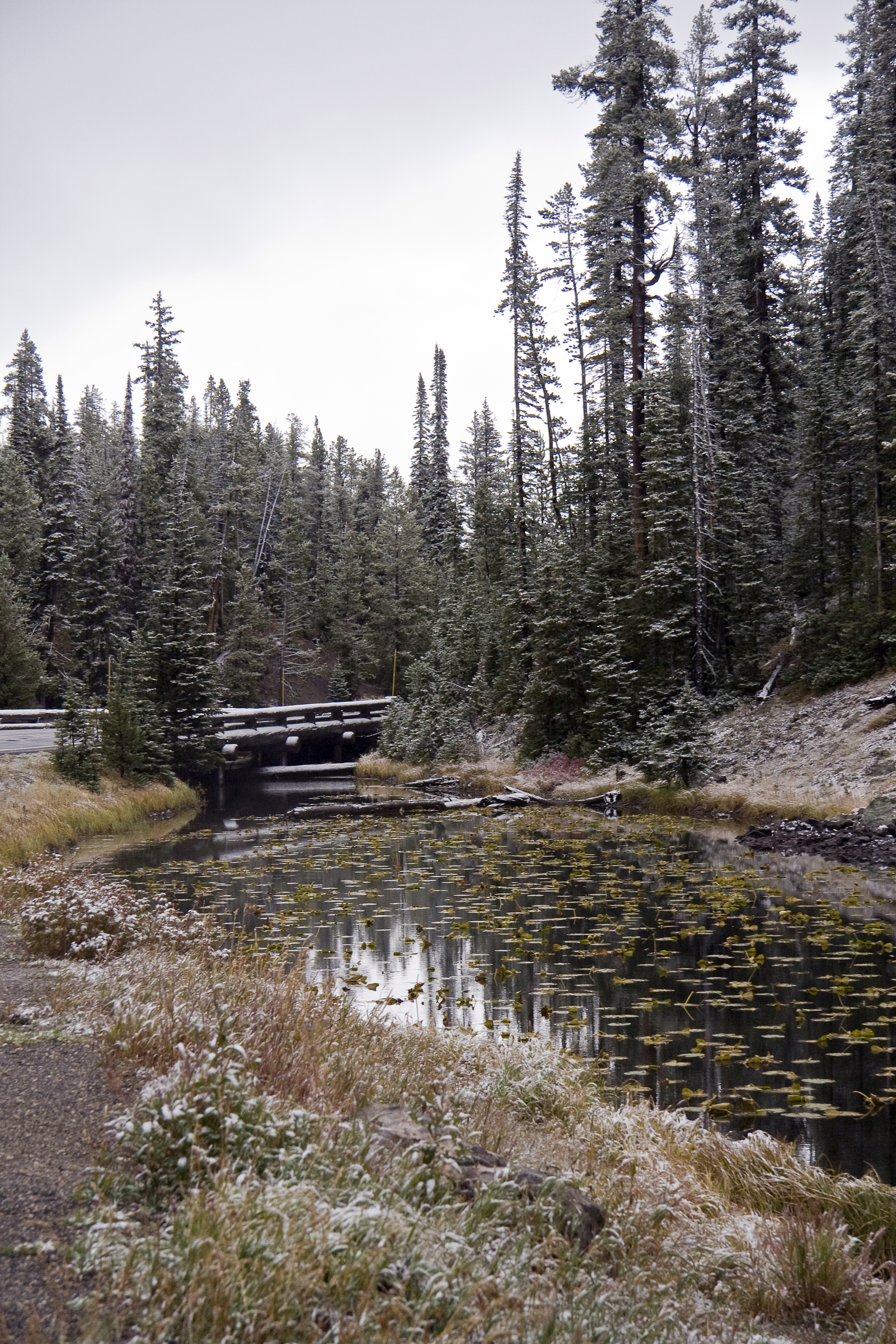
- Isa Lake

- Location within Wyoming Location within the United States
- Location: Yellowstone National Park, Teton County, Wyoming, US
- Coordinates: 44°26′27″N 110°43′09″W
- Type: Natural lake
- Primary outflows: Firehole River (west) (spring only); Lewis River (east) (spring and early summer)
- Basin countries: United States
- Surface elevation: 8,262 feet (2,518 m)

Isa Lake is located in Yellowstone National Park, in the U.S. state of Wyoming. The lake straddles the continental divide at Craig Pass. Hiram M. Chittenden became the first known European to sight the lake in 1891, while searching for the best routes connecting Old Faithful and the West Thumb Geyser Basin. Chittenden named the lake after Miss Isabel Jelke, from Cincinnati, though it is not clear why.

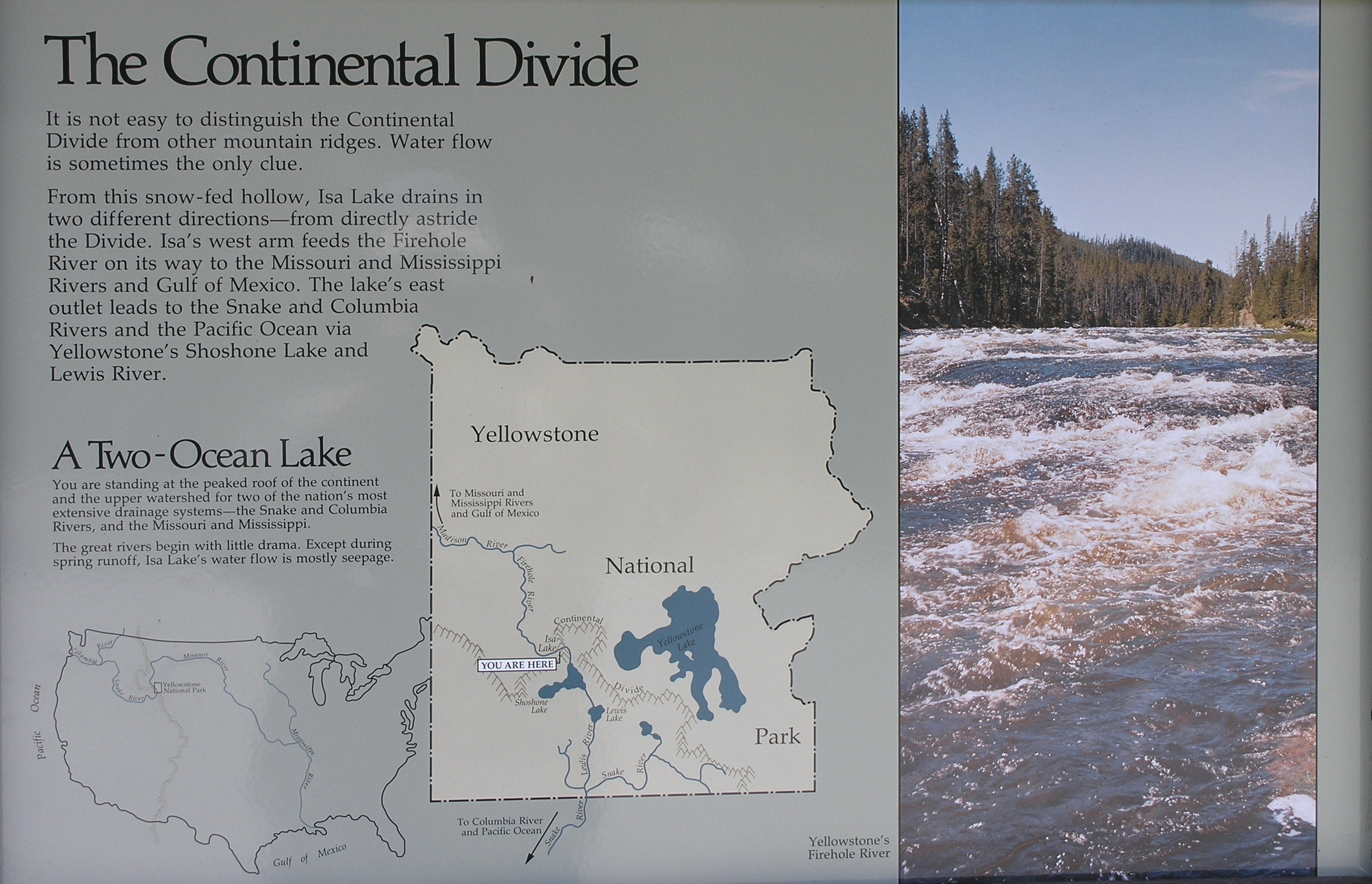
Map of Continental Divide at Isa Lake

Isa Lake is believed to be one of the few natural lakes in the world which drain to two different oceans, another being Wollaston Lake. The east side of the lake drains by way of the Lewis River to the Pacific Ocean and the west side of the lake drains by way of the Firehole River to the Gulf of Mexico.

The lake is easy to visit as it is adjacent to the road that now connects the Old Faithful and West Thumb geysers basins, on what is known as the "lower loop" of the figure-eight roadway which traverses through Yellowstone. The great yellow pond-lily thrives in the lake.

Images of Isa Lake
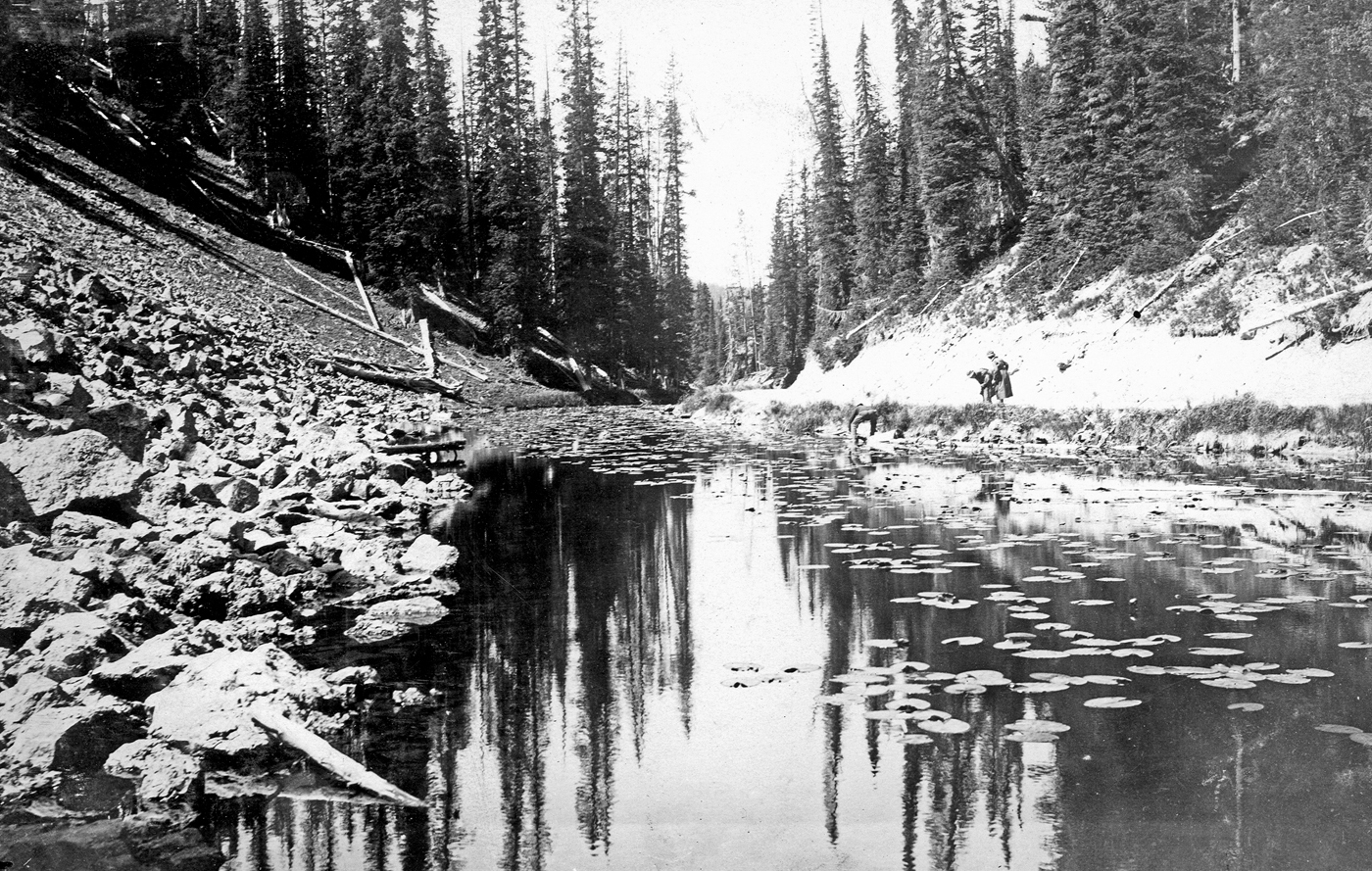
Isa Lake, 1921

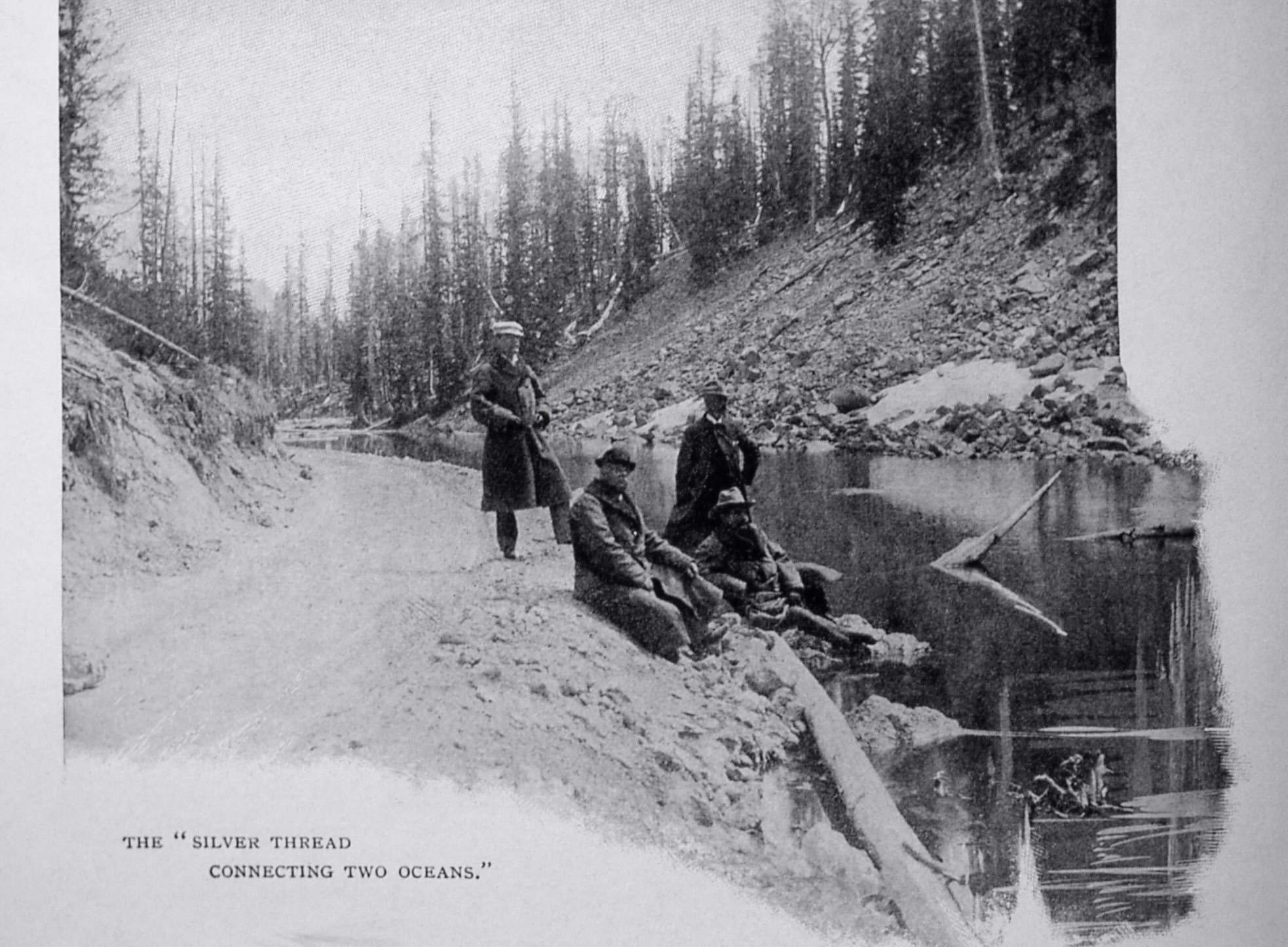
Isa Lake on Craig Pass Road

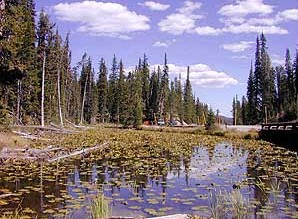
Isa Lake
