= Two Ocean Pass =

Mountain pass in Wyoming, US

Coordinates: 44°02′33″N 110°10′30″W

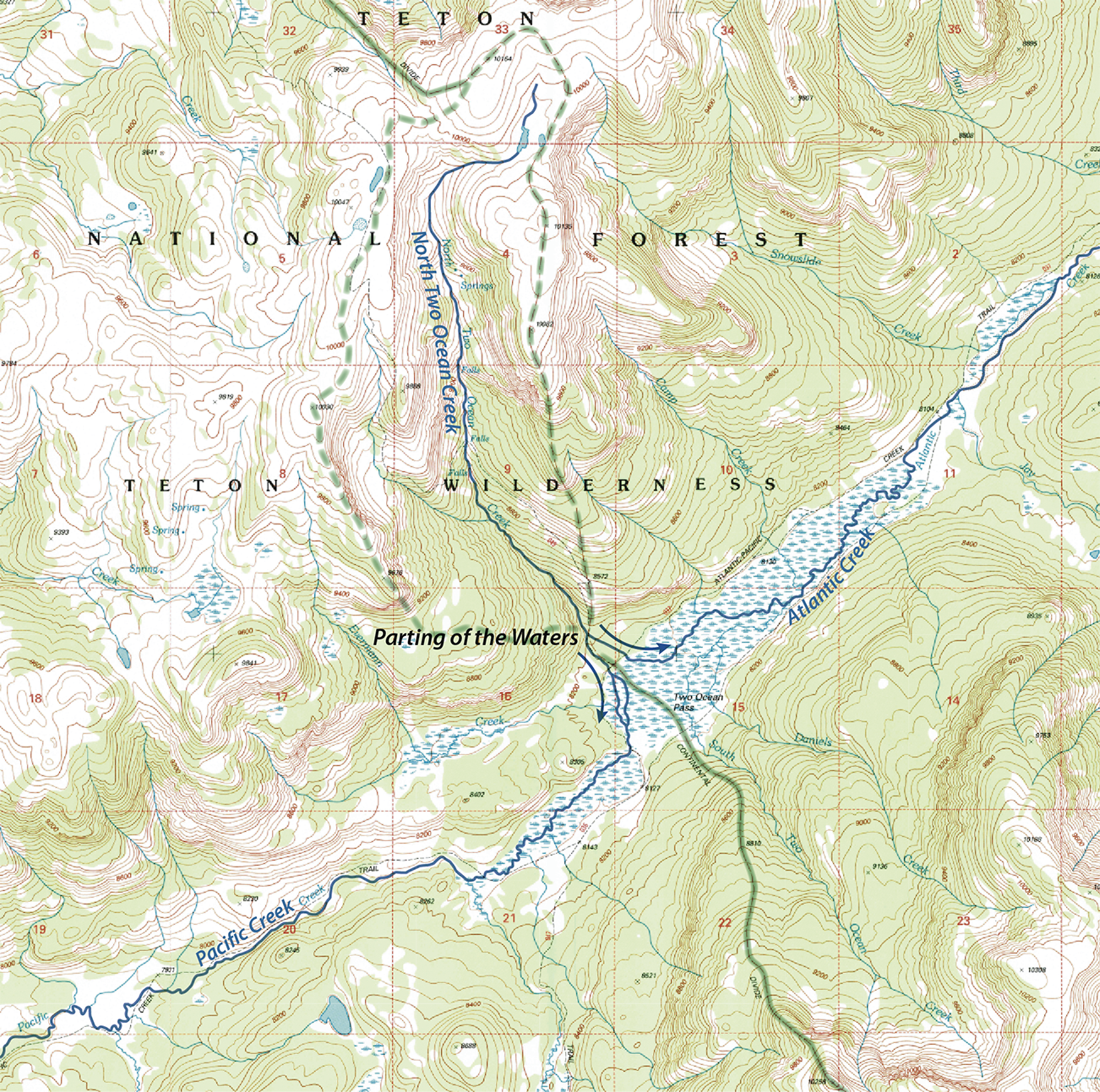
- Modified portion of the USGS Two Ocean Pass Quadrangle
- Interactive map of Two Ocean Pass
- Elevation: 8,130 feet (2,480 m)
- Traversed by: North Two Ocean Creek

Third Approach
- Location: Teton County, Wyoming
- Range: Absaroka Range
- Topo map: USGS Two Ocean Pass

U.S. National Natural Landmark
- Designated: October 1965

Two Ocean Pass is a mountain pass on North America's Continental Divide, in the Teton Wilderness, which is part of Wyoming's Bridger-Teton National Forest. The pass is notable for Parting of the Waters, where one stream, North Two Ocean Creek, splits into two distributaries, Pacific Creek and Atlantic Creek, at Parting of the Waters National Natural Landmark. These two creeks ultimately flow into their respective oceans. Atlantic Creek water eventually flows into the Yellowstone River and empties into the Gulf of Mexico via the Missouri River and Mississippi River. Pacific Creek water eventually flows into the Snake River and empties into the Pacific via the Columbia River.

== Recreation ==
The Continental Divide Trail reaches this location in northern Wyoming. It is accessible by foot or horseback from the south via Brooks Lake Trail head off of Highway 287 or from the north via an extensive hike from Fox Park near Yellowstone National Park's southern border.

== Fish dispersal ==
The pass is thought to have provided access for the Yellowstone cutthroat trout to have colonized Yellowstone Lake and the rest of the Yellowstone River watershed above Lower Falls. Similarly, it has been considered as an alternative explanation for the arrival of non-native lake trout in Yellowstone Lake, which has traditionally been attributed to illegal or accidental stocking.

== Climate ==
Two Ocean Plateau has a subarctic climate (Köppen Dfc).

Climate data for Two Ocean Plateau, Wyoming, 1991–2020 normals: 9240ft (2816m)
Month	Jan	Feb	Mar	Apr	May	Jun	Jul	Aug	Sep	Oct	Nov	Dec	Year
Mean daily maximum °F (°C)	24.8 (−4.0)	28.7 (−1.8)	36.4 (2.4)	42.7 (5.9)	51.1 (10.6)	58.1 (14.5)	66.9 (19.4)	65.8 (18.8)	56.4 (13.6)	43.1 (6.2)	30.1 (−1.1)	22.3 (−5.4)	43.9 (6.6)
Daily mean °F (°C)	16.1 (−8.8)	17.8 (−7.9)	24.2 (−4.3)	30.0 (−1.1)	39.0 (3.9)	45.9 (7.7)	53.8 (12.1)	52.9 (11.6)	44.8 (7.1)	33.1 (0.6)	21.3 (−5.9)	14.3 (−9.8)	32.8 (0.4)
Mean daily minimum °F (°C)	7.3 (−13.7)	6.8 (−14.0)	11.9 (−11.2)	17.4 (−8.1)	26.8 (−2.9)	33.6 (0.9)	40.7 (4.8)	39.9 (4.4)	33.0 (0.6)	23.0 (−5.0)	12.5 (−10.8)	6.3 (−14.3)	21.6 (−5.8)
Average precipitation inches (mm)	4.65 (118)	4.28 (109)	4.71 (120)	4.33 (110)	3.77 (96)	3.23 (82)	1.41 (36)	1.57 (40)	2.21 (56)	3.33 (85)	4.51 (115)	5.02 (128)	43.02 (1,095)
Source 1: XMACIS2
Source 2: NOAA (Precipitation)

== Gallery ==
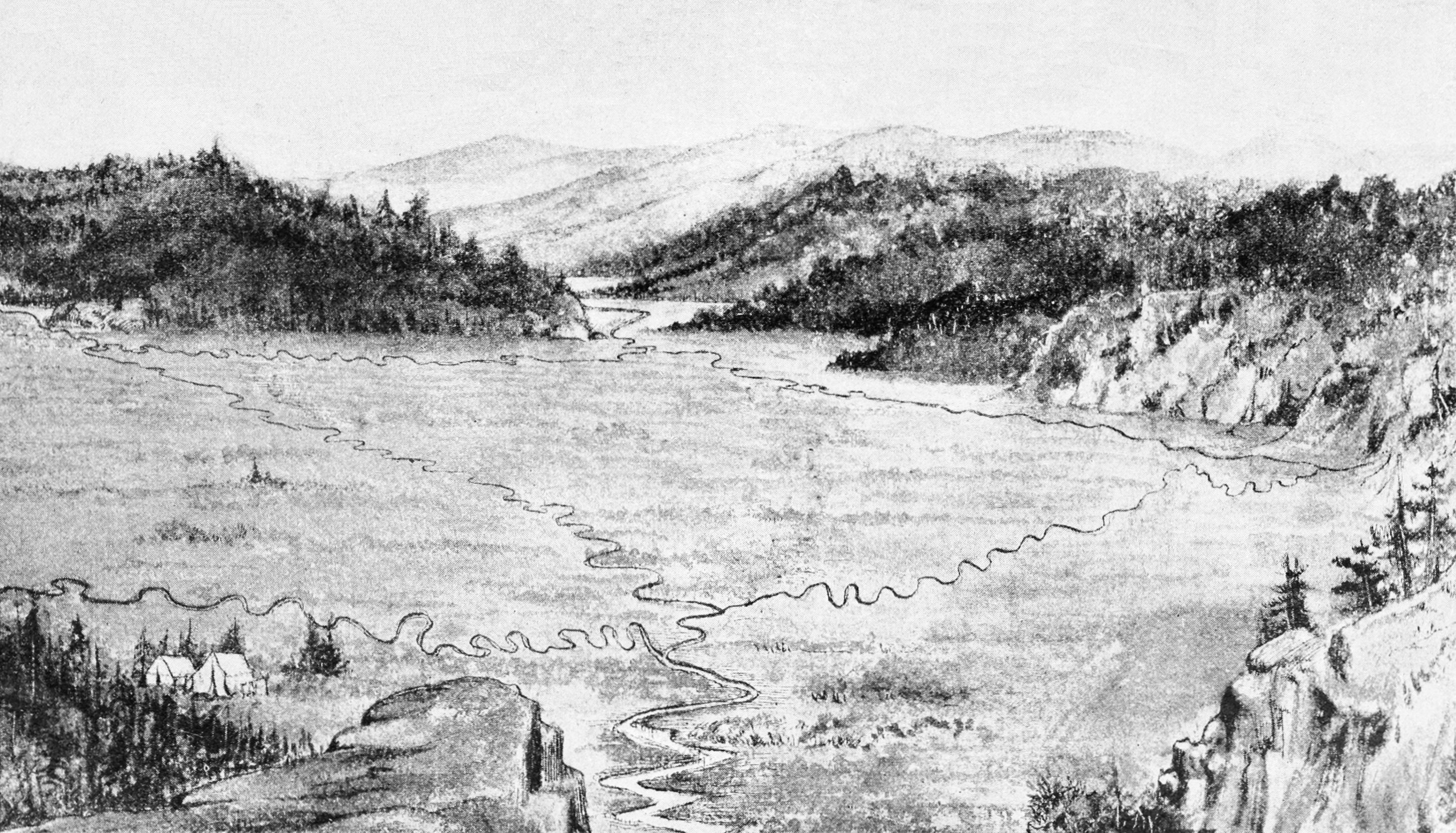
A drawing made in 1894 of Two Ocean Pass with a view to the northeast. Atlantic Creek exits the pass between the hills in the upper center part of the image. Pacific Creek exits to the southwest in the bottom center of the image. North Two Oceans Creek enters from the left top center of the image and divides into its two distributaries and South Two Ocean Creek enters from the right center of the image and is also shown dividing into two streams. Evermann Creek also enters the area from the west (left center, just above the tents).

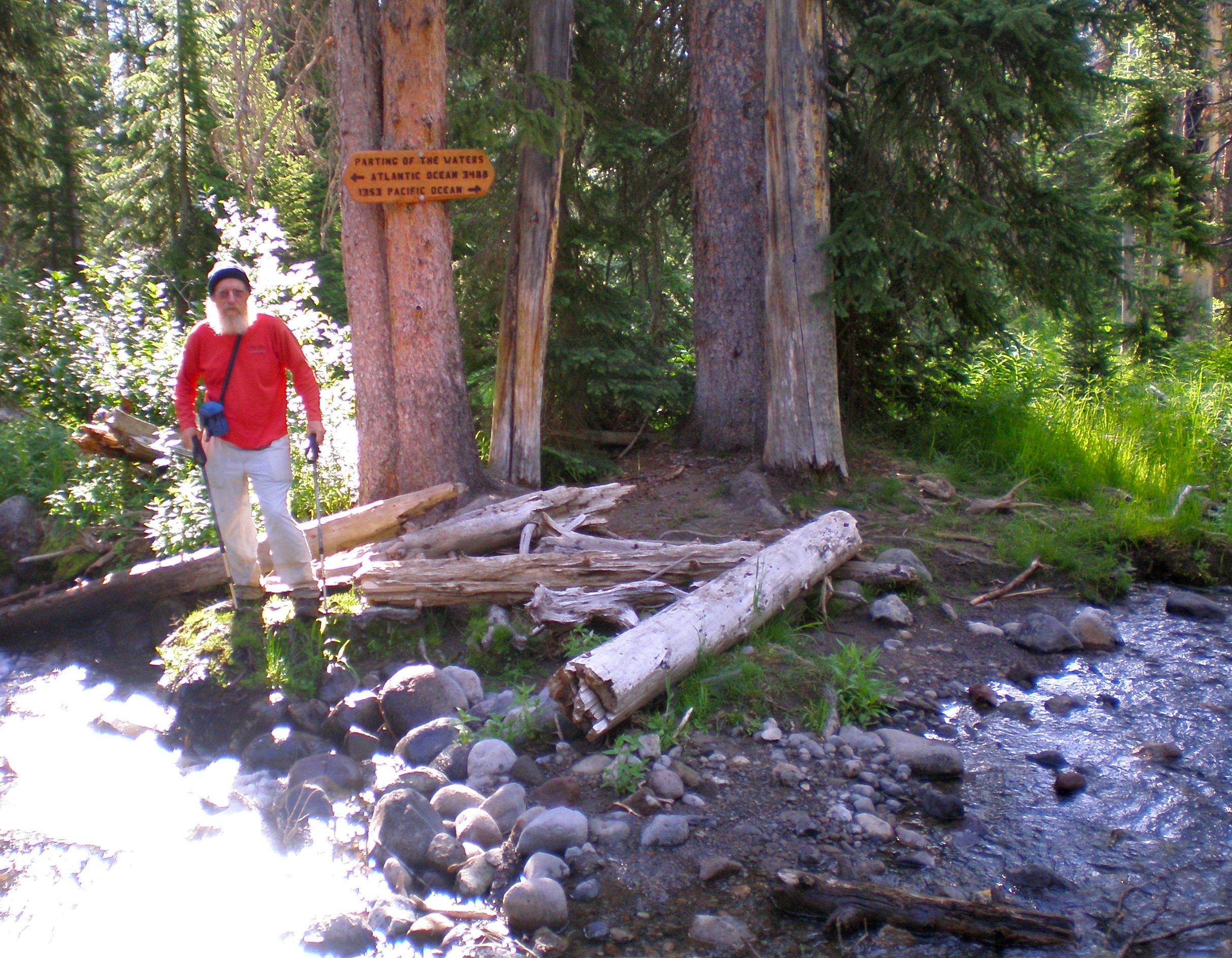
Here Two Ocean Creek splits in two directions on the Continental Divide. Water on the left in this 2011 photo goes to the Atlantic and water on the right to the Pacific Ocean.

== See also ==
Committee's Punch Bowl, a small lake on the Continental Divide between British Columbia and Alberta, which drains to both the Arctic and Pacific Oceans.
