= 1987 Teton–Yellowstone tornado =

1987 F4 tornado in Wyoming, United States

Coordinates: 44.02°N 110.23°W

Teton–Yellowstone tornado
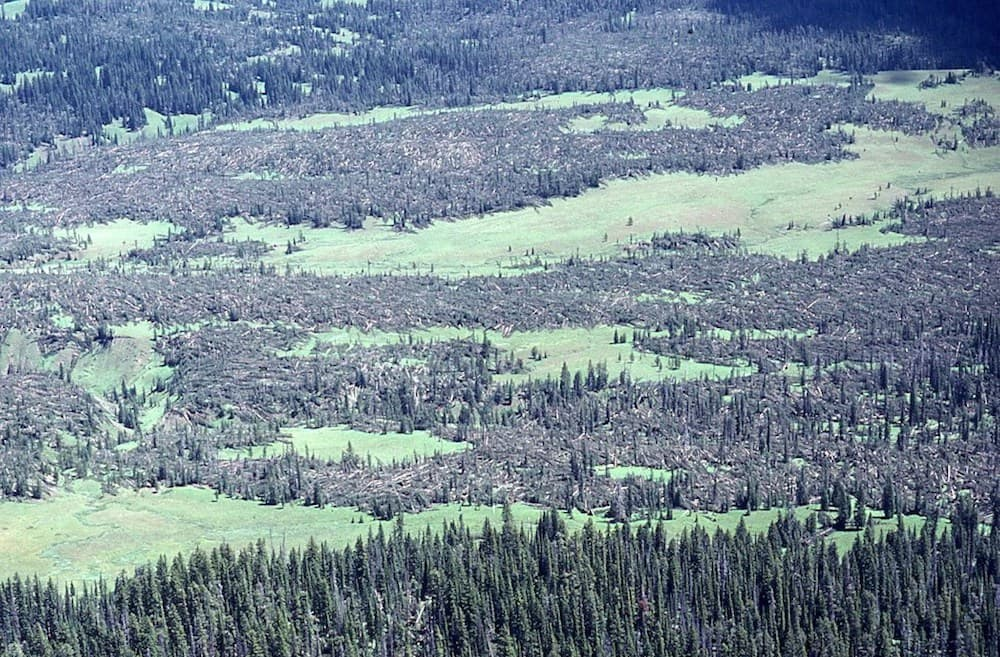
- A large swath of trees leveled by the tornado

Meteorological history
- Date: July 21, 1987
- Formed: July 21, 1987, 1:28 p.m. MDT (UTC−05:00)
- Dissipated: July 21, 1987, 1:54 p.m. MDT (UTC−05:00)
- Duration: 26 minutes

F4 tornado
- on the Fujita scale
- Highest winds: 207–260 mph (333–418 km/h)

Overall effects
- Casualties: None
- Damage: $2.5 million (1987 USD)
- Areas affected: Teton Wilderness, Yellowstone National Park
- Part of the tornado outbreaks of 1987

The Teton–Yellowstone tornado was a rare high-altitude tornado which occurred on July 21, 1987, in the U.S. state of Wyoming. Rated at F4 on the Fujita scale, it remains the strongest tornado ever recorded in the state and the only officially rated F4/EF4 in Wyoming history. The tornado cut through a 24.4-mile (39.2 km)-long and 1.6-mile (2.5 km)-wide swath of the Teton Wilderness and Yellowstone National Park, crossing the Continental Divide. Damage occurred at elevations ranging from 8,500 to 10,000 feet (2,600 to 3,000 m), making it the highest-altitude violent tornado recorded in the United States. At the time, it was the highest-elevation tornado known, since surpassed by several others, including a 2004 tornado above 12,000 feet (3,700 m) in California's Sequoia National Park. While no human fatalities or injuries occurred, an estimated one million trees were felled by the tornado. The tornado damage was originally thought to be the result of strong thunderstorm straight-line winds until the area was surveyed by University of Chicago severe weather meteorologist Ted Fujita and his colleagues, who published a paper in 1989 surveying the tornado's path and discussing its meteorological character.

== Meteorological synopsis ==
The tornado developed on July 21, 1987, from a severe thunderstorm that produced a mesocyclone near the intersection of a mesohigh boundary and a warm front. The parent storm was tracked using infrared satellite imagery from GOES satellites. The storm moved at approximately 25 m/s (90 km/h; 56 mph), while satellite imagery showed a pronounced increase in very cold cloud-top temperatures during the tornado's development.

The tornado formed at approximately 1:28 p.m. MDT and initially produced relatively weak tree damage. It intensified rapidly near Gravel Ridge, where a small area of extreme forest damage was rated F4 on the Fujita scale. The tornado subsequently produced extensive F2 and F3 damage as it traveled through the mountainous terrain of the Teton Wilderness.

The tornado crossed the Continental Divide at approximately 3,070 m (10,070 ft) above sea level. Fujita's aerial survey documented a damage path approximately 39.2 km (24.4 mi) long and 2.5 km (1.6 mi) wide. The survey also identified four apparent spin-up swirl marks and 72 microburst outflows within the broader damage area.

The tornado continued eastward toward the Yellowstone River valley before dissipating at approximately 1:54 p.m. MDT. Fujita estimated that the tornado remained on the ground for approximately 26 minutes and had an average forward speed of about 25 m/s (90 km/h; 56 mph).

== Storm development and track ==
The tornado track began in a valley 1.9 miles (3 km) to the northeast of Mount Randolph, Fujita estimated the tornado first developed at 1:28 p.m. MDT. The damage path became wider and more consistent as it approached Gravel Ridge, producing a large area of tree damage to the northeast of the ridge. The tornado appeared to intensify quickly, as the damage it produced increased from F0 intensity to F4 intensity in less than 3.1 miles (5 km), estimated at three minutes of travel time. The lone area of F4 damage was found north of Gravel Ridge, based on a small area affected by the worst tree damage: large Engelmann spruce trees between 30–40 centimetres (12–16 in) in diameter were found uprooted and stripped of their bark, with the bare trunks spattered with wind-blown topsoil. Meteorologist Ted Fujita noted that the only comparable forest damage he had seen associated with an F4 tornado had been in the Appalachian Mountains after the Murphy, North Carolina tornado of the 1974 Super Outbreak.

The tornado maintained F2–F3 intensity for the next 6.2 miles (10 km), producing a large swath of tree damage. During this period, it approached and crossed directly over Enos Lake in the Bridger–Teton National Forest. A group of nine campers near Enos Lake reported that they saw no funnel cloud, but that the storm developed quickly and a "roar like a train in the distance" was accompanied by hailstones the size of golf balls. Fujita hypothesized that because of the area's high elevation and the storm's low cloud base, no funnel cloud would have been visible. The tornado then descended into Pacific Creek Valley before climbing up to a high plateau at nearly 9,800 feet (3,000 m) in elevation, weakening significantly. It produced more tree damage on steep slopes until it crossed the Continental Divide, damaging trees at an elevation of 10,070 feet (3,070 m). More severe tree damage occurred in several cirques. The tornado then crossed the drainage of Falcon Creek before descending into the Yellowstone River Valley, gradually weakening as it did so. The damage path became more sporadic until it disappeared on the valley's far eastern side, with the tornado's time of dissipation calculated to have been 1:54 p.m. MDT.

=== Summary ===
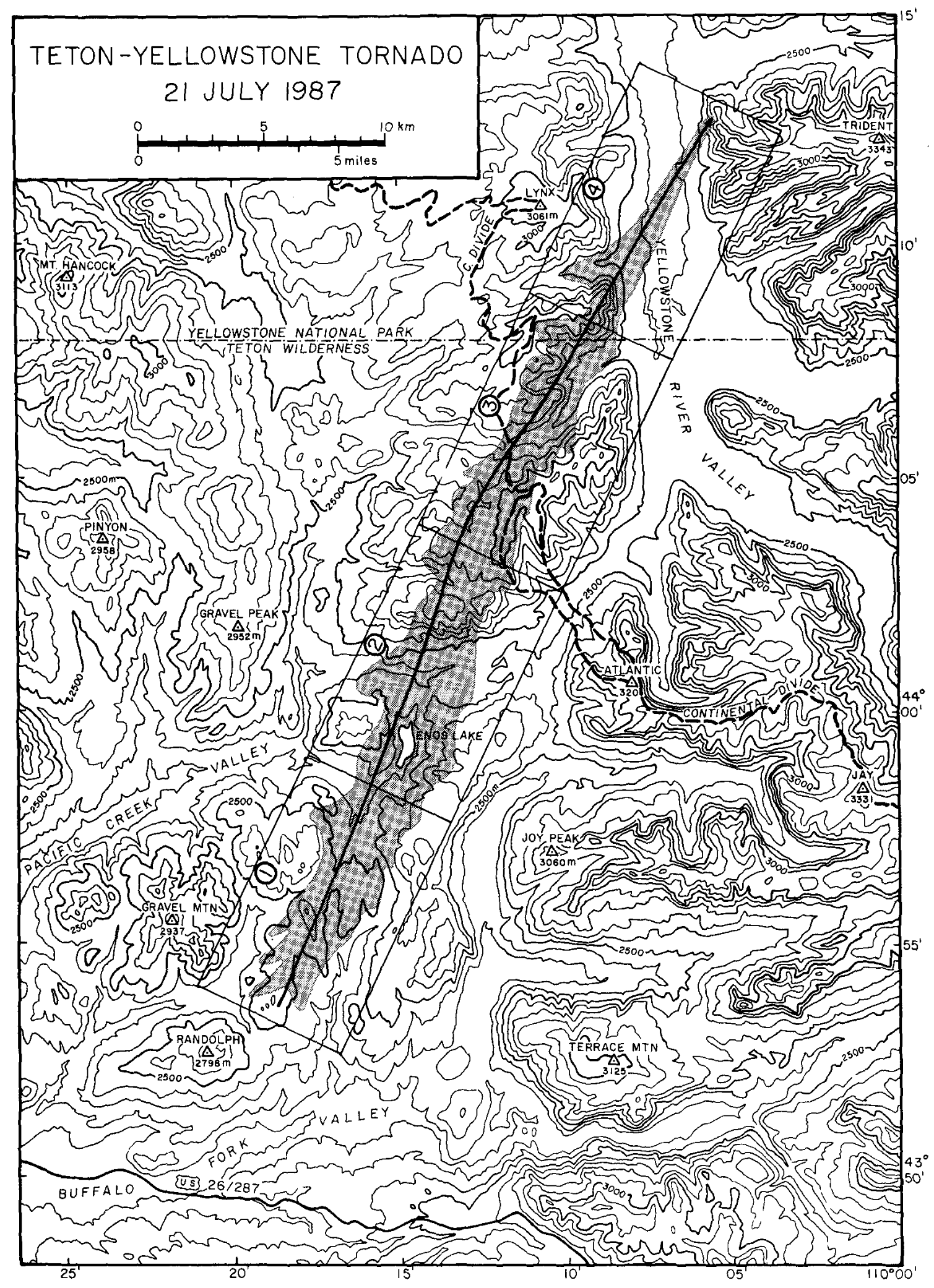
Damage track map of the tornado through the Teton Wilderness and Yellowstone National Park

The tornado's total damage path was 24.4 miles (39.2 km) long, with an average width of 1.6 miles (2.5 km) and a maximum width of 2.4 miles (3.9 km). Fujita estimated the tornado's duration on the ground at approximately 26 minutes, with a forward velocity of 56 miles per hour (90 km/h).

== Aftermath ==
No casualties resulted from the tornado, though as many as twelve people were trapped in the backcountry by the storm. Trail maintenance crews and other federal workers labored for weeks to clear approximately 15 miles of trail blocked by the downed trees, and the total cost of the damage was recorded as $2.5 million.

=== Discovery and study ===
After the July 23 report of a massive blowdown in the Teton Wilderness by the Forest Service, Fujita arranged for multiple aerial surveys by Cessna aircraft of the tornado's track, resulting in more than 1,400 photographs that recorded every single damaged tree. The southernmost area of the track was also visited on foot and photographed by Fujita's colleague Bradley S. Churchill.

=== Timber blowdown ===
In the fall of 1987, U.S. senator for Wyoming Malcolm Wallop, the Fremont County Commission, and timber groups lobbied for the ability to harvest the fallen timber from the tornado's path, arguing that it posed a threat because of wildfire and beetle infestation risks and would provide nearby lumber mills with work. The Wyoming Chapter of the Sierra Club opposed the suggestion on the grounds that the harvesting would require many miles of logging roads through wilderness and would create a dangerous precedent. In the end, much of the area burned in the Huck Snake River Complex and Mink Creek fires during the Yellowstone fires of 1988. Though several thousand acres of the tornado blowdown track remained unaffected, it prevented Fujita and his colleagues from returning to perform follow-up aerial photographic surveys and site visits.

== See also ==
- 2009 Goshen County tornado - A strong EF2 tornado in Goshen County, Wyoming that was well documented
