= Pacific Creek (Teton County, Wyoming) =

Physical characteristics
- Source
  - location: Two Ocean Pass
  - coordinates: 44°00′58″N 110°09′23″W
  - elevation: 8,130 ft (2,480 m)
- Mouth
  - location: Confluence with Snake River
  - coordinates: 43°50′49″N 110°31′08″W
  - elevation: 6,720 ft (2,050 m)
- Basin size: 169 sq mi (440 km^{2})
- Discharge
  - average: 60 cu ft/s (1.7 m^{3}/s)

National Wild and Scenic Rivers System

Pacific Creek begins in the Teton Wilderness of Bridger-Teton National Forest in the U.S. state of Wyoming. The creek originates from North Two Ocean Creek, which splits into Pacific and Atlantic Creeks at Two Ocean Pass along the Continental Divide. Pacific Creek travels southwest into Grand Teton National Park and receives outflow from Two Ocean and Emma Matilda Lakes just before it empties into the Snake River immediately northwest of Moran, Wyoming. Pacific Creek has a watershed which covers 169 square miles (440 km^{2}).

== See also ==
- Parting of the Waters
- Teton–Yellowstone tornado, a 1987 F4 tornado that passed over Pacific Creek
