= Craig Pass =

Mountain pass in Yellowstone National Park, United States

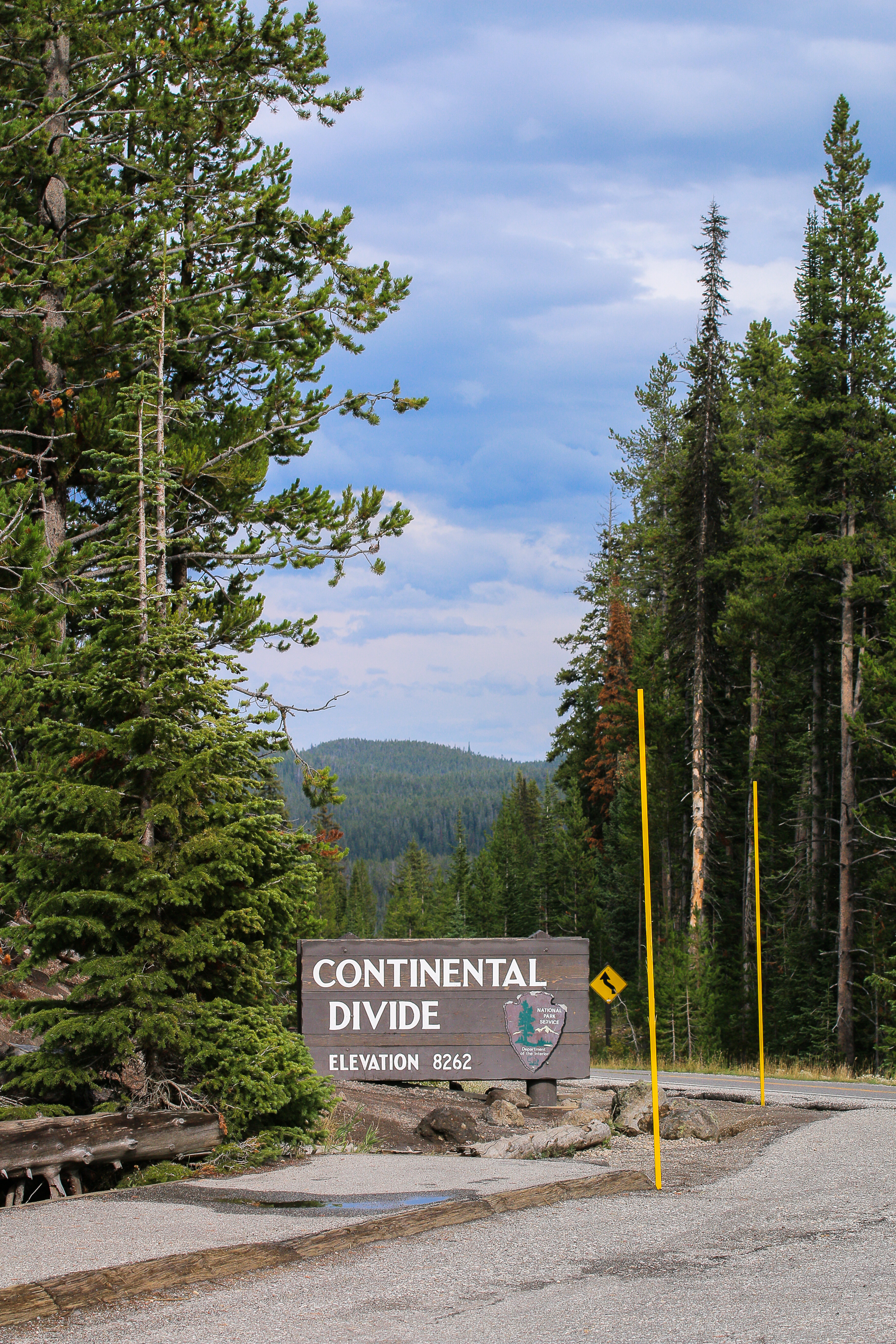
- The Continental Divide at the Craig Pass

- Location within Wyoming
- Elevation: 2,518.3 m (8,262 ft)
- Traversed by: U.S. Route 191

Third Approach
- Location: Teton County, Wyoming, United States
- Coordinates: 44°26′30″N 110°43′11″W

Craig Pass (el.8,262 feet (2,518 m)), is a mountain pass located on the Continental Divide in Yellowstone National Park in Wyoming, United States. The Grand Loop Road crosses the pass approximately 8 miles (13 km) east of Old Faithful Geyser.

The pass was named by Hiram Chittenden for Ida M. Craig (Wilcox), the daughter of a close friend, General James Craig. Ida Craig was purportedly the first tourist to cross the pass after it was completed in September, 1891. Roads are usually open throughout the year, but they may be closed for a short time during winter when the weather is bad.

The small Isa Lake is located just west of the pass on the Grand Loop Road and is noted for striding the Continental Divide and draining into two different watersheds—the Atlantic via the Missouri River and the Pacific via the Snake River.
