= Committee Punch Bowl =

Lake in Alberta and British Columbia, Canada

Coordinates: 52°22′52″N 118°11′05″W

The Committee Punch Bowl (also spelled Committee's Punch Bowl) is a small tarn on the continental divide straddling the border between the Canadian provinces of Alberta and British Columbia. George Simpson, governor of the Hudson's Bay Company, named the lake for the London-based managing committee of that company in 1824. While journeying on an important trade route in the company's trade area in what is now western Canada and parts of Alaska and the northwestern United States, he saw the lake at the summit of Athabasca Pass.

At the very top of the pass or height of Land is a small circular Lake or Basin of water which empties itself in opposite directions and may be said to be the source of Columbia & Athabasca Rivers as it bestows its favors on both these prodigious Streams... That this basin should send its Waters to each side of the Continent and give birth to two of the principal Rivers in North America is no less strange than true ...

—George Simpson

As Simpson noted, Committee's Punch Bowl drains to two oceans. Its northwest margin is the source of the Whirlpool River, tributary to the Athabasca River which runs to Lake Athabasca. That lake drains into the Rivière des Rochers which in turn joins the Peace River to form the Slave River to Great Slave Lake from which the waters descend the Mackenzie River to the Arctic Ocean.

The southern outlet drains to Pacific Creek to the Wood River to the former Canoe River, now impounded and called the Canoe Reach of Kinbasket Lake, a reservoir of the Columbia River, which runs to the Pacific Ocean in the United States.

== See also ==
- Divide Creek, a creek 167km southeast of Committee's Punch Bowl, which drains to both sides of the Continental Divide on the British Columbia-Alberta border; its easterly waters flow to the Arctic by way of Hudson's Bay
- Two Ocean Pass, a mountain pass on the Continental Divide in Wyoming, which drains to both the Pacific and Atlantic oceans.
