= Teton Wilderness =

Wilderness area in Wyoming, United States

- IUCN category Ib (wilderness area)
- Location within the United States
- Location: Teton / Park / Fremont counties, Wyoming, United States
- Nearest city: Jackson, Wyoming
- Coordinates: 44°4′0″N 109°56′0″W
- Area: 585,238 acres (2,368.37 km^{2})
- Established: 1964
- Governing body: U.S. Forest Service

Teton Wilderness is located in Wyoming, United States. Created in 1964, the Teton Wilderness is located within Bridger-Teton National Forest and consists of 585,238 acres (2,370 km^{2}). The wilderness is bordered on the north by Yellowstone National Park and to the west by Grand Teton National Park and the John D. Rockefeller Jr. Memorial Parkway. The Washakie Wilderness is to the east and the remainder of Bridger-Teton National Forest is to the south. The Teton Wilderness is a part of the 20 million-acre (81,000 km^{2}) Greater Yellowstone Ecosystem. Among many other features, Teton Wilderness is notable for having the most remote location (farthest from any road) of any place in the contiguous 48 states of the US. This location occurs very close to Bridger Lake, near the confluence of the Thorofare and Yellowstone Rivers, not far from the USFS Hawk's Rest Ranger Station.

U.S. Wilderness Areas do not allow motorized or mechanized vehicles, including bicycles and all-terrain vehicles (ATVs). Motorized tools including chainsaws are similarly prohibited, so all trail maintenance by USFS or personnel is done using manual tools such as 2-person crosscut saws, saddle saws and axes. Although camping and fishing are allowed with proper permits, building of roads as well as structures beyond existing government patrol cabins is prohibited. Similarly, logging and mining are not allowed, all in compliance with the 1964 Wilderness Act. Wilderness areas within National Forests and Bureau of Land Management areas also allow hunting in season.

With the Continental Divide running through Teton Wilderness, altitudes tend to be lofty with remote Younts Peak (12,165 ft./3708 m) being the highest point.

One of the most interesting hydrological features in North America occurs at the Continental Divide at Two Ocean Pass within the Teton Wilderness. This wide, gentle, marshy pass separates the headwaters of Pacific Creek, which flows Westerly to the Pacific Ocean via the Snake and Columbia Rivers, and Atlantic Creek, which flows Easterly to the Atlantic Ocean via the Yellowstone, Missouri, and Mississippi Rivers. At Two Ocean Pass, exactly on the Continental Divide, North Two Ocean Creek flows down from its drainage on the side of Two Ocean Plateau and divides its waters between Pacific Creek and Atlantic Creek. This spot is known as Parting of the Waters, and occurs at 44° 02.576'N, 110° 10.497'W. At this exact spot, water actually covers the Continental Divide such that a fish could safely swim from the Pacific Ocean to the Atlantic Ocean drainages.

The Teton Wilderness has 450 miles (725 km) of hiking trails, all of which pass through prime grizzly bear habitat. Black bear, wolverine, cougar, moose, elk, mule deer, pronghorn, bison, bighorn sheep and the elusive wolf packs are all found here. At least 75 other mammal species exist in the wilderness including beaver, coyote, bobcat, mink, porcupine, river otter, marmot and pika. Both bald and golden eagles as well as falcons, owls, osprey, sandhill crane and geese are just a few of the 300 different species of birds in the wilderness. 30 different species of fish are known to exist as well including several varieties of cutthroat trout. The forest has hundreds of species of trees and plant life such as lodgepole pine, whitebark pine and varieties of spruce and fir. Sagebrush and willows are found in the open fields and along streams. This wilderness is infrequently visited in some areas, borders on the most remote section of Yellowstone National Park and has only a few limited access points along the southern and western border.

The headwaters of the Yellowstone River are found in the east-southeast reaches of the Teton Wilderness. The Yellowstone River is formed at the remote confluence of its North and South Forks, each being about 5-6 miles in length with their respective headwaters in high alpine terrain essentially wrapping around Younts Peak near Thorofare Mountain and the boundary with the Washakie Wilderness Area.

Weather can be a factor in the wilderness with infrequent but severe thunderstorms in the spring and early summer. In 1987, a very rare high altitude tornado, called the Teton–Yellowstone tornado, destroyed an area of 20 miles (32 km) long and 2 miles (3.2 km) wide. The following year, almost half the forested sections of the wilderness were greatly impacted by the Yellowstone fires of 1988. These fires enhanced the wilderness ecosystem by reducing the amount of dead and down wood, helping lodgepole pine cones to germinate, and improving grazing opportunities for such animals as elk and mule deer.

== See also ==
- List of U.S. Wilderness Areas
