= Continental divide =

Drainage divide on a continent

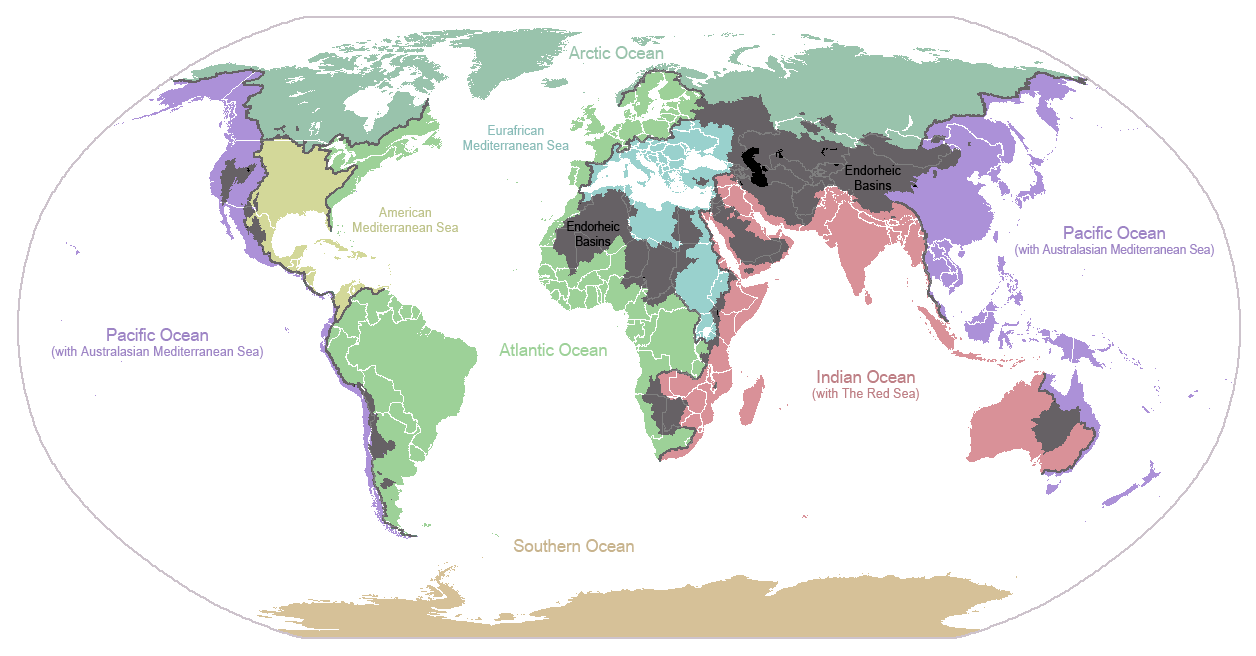
Major continental divides, showing drainage into the major oceans and seas of the world. Grey areas are endorheic basins that do not drain to the ocean.

A continental divide is a drainage divide on a continent such that the drainage basin on one side of the divide feeds into one ocean or sea, and the basin on the other side either feeds into a different ocean or sea, or else is endorheic, not connected to the open sea. Every continent on Earth except Antarctica (which has no known significant, definable free-flowing surface rivers) has at least one continental drainage divide; islands, even small ones like Killiniq Island on the Labrador Sea in Canada, may also host part of a continental divide or have their own island-spanning divide. The endpoints of a continental divide may be coastlines of gulfs, seas or oceans, the boundary of an endorheic basin, or another continental divide. One case, the Great Basin Divide, is a closed loop around an endorheic basin. The endpoints where a continental divide meets the coast are not always definite since the exact border between adjacent bodies of water is usually not clearly defined. The International Hydrographic Organization's publication Limits of Oceans and Seas defines exact boundaries of oceans, but it is not universally recognized. Where a continental divide meets an endorheic basin, such as the Great Divide Basin of Wyoming, the continental divide splits and encircles the basin. Where two divides intersect, they form a triple divide, or a tripoint, a junction where three watersheds meet.

Whether a divide is considered a continental divide distinguished from other secondary drainage divides may depend on whether the associated gulfs, seas, or oceans are considered separate. For example, the Gulf of Mexico is considered separate from the Atlantic Ocean, so the Eastern Continental Divide separates their respective watersheds. But the Sea of Cortez is usually not considered separate from the Pacific Ocean, so the divide between the Colorado River watershed, which drains to the Sea of Cortez, and the Columbia River watershed, which drains to the Pacific Ocean, is not considered to be a continental divide.

Together, continental divides demarcate a set of drainage basins or watersheds, each of which drains to a specific ocean, sea or gulf, such as the North American Atlantic seaboard watershed which is demarcated by the Eastern Continental Divide and Great Lakes-St. Lawrence Divide.

== Divides by continent ==
Note: A 'continent' for the purpose of water divides may not correspond to a geopolitical or geophysical continent.

=== Africa ===
In Africa, the most significant continental divide is the Congo-Nile Divide between the watersheds of the Nile and the Congo, passing through the area of the African Great Lakes. Between the Congo and the Sahara, a vast area drains into the endorheic Lake Chad, puncturing the Atlantic–Mediterranean divide. The Mediterranean–Indian Ocean divide is punctured in East Africa by the endorheic lake systems of the East African Rift; in the south of the continent the divide between the Atlantic and Indian Oceans snakes between the watersheds of the Congo, Zambezi, Limpopo, and Orange Rivers, with the Okavango terminating in the Kalahari Desert.

=== Antarctica ===
Antarctica is not generally considered to have a continental divide. The interior of Antarctica receives very little precipitation, and that in the form of snow, and the continent is surrounded by the Southern Ocean. The Transantarctic Mountains divide the ice streams draining West Antarctica into the Ronne Ice Shelf, toward the Pacific Ocean and into the Ross Ice Shelf, from those draining East Antarctica toward the Atlantic and Indian Oceans.

=== Australia ===
In Australia, the Great Dividing Range, or Great Divide, largely separates those rivers flowing to the eastern seaboard and the Pacific Ocean from those flowing westward to the Murray–Darling Basin and to the Southern Ocean or to the Gulf of Carpentaria or to the Lake Eyre Basin. Two significant continental drainage divide tripoints are found along the Great Divide. Kennedy Junction marks the hydrological apex of waters running to the Pacific Ocean, via the Fitzroy Basin, the Southern Ocean, via the Murray Darling Basin and the Lake Eyre Basin. Just a little to the north Mitchell Junction marks the hydrological apex of waters running to the Indian Ocean (via the Gulf of Carpentaria and Indonesian Throughflow), the Pacific Ocean via the Burdekin Basin and the Lake Eyre Basin. Many of the continents interior rivers drain into the endorheic Lake Eyre Basin, which during previous Ice Ages was a much larger sea.

=== Eurasia ===
Eurasia has various divides, depending on the definition of "ocean" (for example, the Mediterranean Sea and its various lobes, the Atlantic Ocean, the Arctic Ocean, the Baltic Sea, the Black Sea, and the North Sea). Examples include:

- Asia
  - Himachal Pradesh (Sutlej–Indus): Arabian Sea
  - Lake Baikal (Yenisei–Lena): Kara Sea, Laptev Sea
  - Perm Krai/Urals (Volga–Pechora/Ob): Caspian Sea, Arctic Sea
  - Tibetan Plateau (Himalayas): Indian Ocean, Pacific Ocean
  - Uttarakhand (Yamuna–Ganges): Bay of Bengal
- Europe
  - The European watershed with the triple divide of North Sea (Rhine), Black Sea (Danube) and Mediterranean Adriatic Sea (Po) at Lunghin Pass in the Central Eastern Alps.
- Europe-Asia
  - Don-Volga: Black Sea, Caspian Sea

==== British Isles ====
- Scottish watershed

=== North America ===
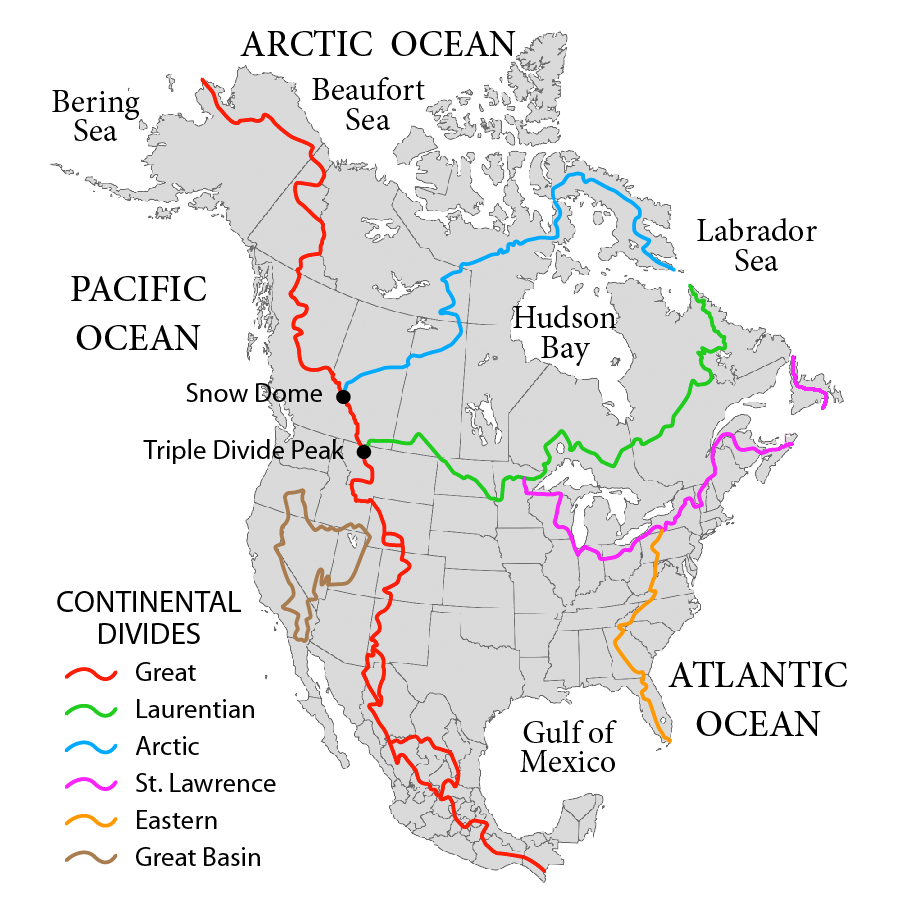
Principal hydrological divides of North America.

- The Arctic Divide or Northern Divide in northern and western Canada, separates the Arctic Ocean watershed from the Hudson Bay watershed. The Arctic Divide runs from Snow Dome Mountain, on the edge of the Columbia Icefield in Jasper National Park on the eastern border of British Columbia, northeasterly across Alberta, Saskatchewan, the Northwest Territories and Nunavut. It continues to northern Baffin Island then runs southeast along the spine of the island to the tip of Meta Incognita Peninsula. This divide was a barrier to transportation until the Methye Portage in northwestern Saskatchewan was discovered in 1778, which opened up the Arctic rivers to the fur traders and became part of a transcontinental trade route from Atlantic to Pacific. It was of significance in Canadian history because it marked the northern boundary of Rupert's Land, the trading monopoly area of the Hudson's Bay Company.
- The Continental Divide of the Americas, also called the Great Divide, and, especially in Alaska, the Pacific-Arctic Divide, separates the watersheds of the Pacific Ocean from those of the Atlantic and Arctic Oceans. It runs from the western tip of the Seward Peninsula in Alaska, through western Canada along the crest of the Rocky Mountains, including through Glacier National Park, Yellowstone National Park, and Rocky Mountain National Park, to New Mexico. From there, it follows the crest of Mexico's Sierra Madre Occidental and extends to the tip of South America. It is crossed by the Panama Canal at Gatun Lake, by the two outlets of Isa Lake in Yellowstone National Park, and by the Two Ocean Creeks at Parting of the Waters.
- The Eastern Continental Divide in eastern United States separates the Gulf of Mexico watershed from the Atlantic Seaboard watershed. It runs from near the middle of the northern border of Pennsylvania southwesterly along the Appalachian Mountains to the city of Atlanta, Georgia, then southeasterly through the Georgia plateau and swampy lowlands of Florida to the Lake Okeechobee drainage basin in central Florida.
- The Great Basin Divide in the western United States is a closed circuit that separates the Great Basin watershed from the Pacific Ocean watershed. The region is bounded by the Wasatch Mountains to the east, the Sierra Nevada and Cascade Ranges to the west, and the Snake River Basin to the north. In the south, the divide extends to the boundary of the Laguna Salada watershed in the Sonoran Desert of the Baja Peninsula.
- The Laurentian Divide separates the watershed of the Atlantic Ocean from that of Hudson Bay. The western part of it from Glacier National Park in the Rocky Mountains to the Great Lakes watershed marked the northern boundary of the Louisiana Purchase and was the border between the United States and British North America until it was superseded by the 49th parallel in the treaty of 1818. In Canada, it historically marked the southern boundary of the fur trading monopoly area of the Hudson's Bay Company, and the easternmost portion still marks part of the boundary between Quebec and Labrador. The divide traverses very flat terrain, especially in North Dakota, causing many travelers to believe the sign marking the divide is a joke.
- The Saint Lawrence River Divide separates the Great Lakes-St. Lawrence Basin from the rest of the Atlantic Ocean watershed. Two canals cross the divide: the Chicago Sanitary and Ship Canal crosses the Chicago Portage and connects Lake Michigan to the Mississippi River watershed, and the Erie Canal connects Lake Erie to the Hudson River watershed. Historically there were additional canals, e.g., the Ohio and Erie Canal, but most of these are no longer in operation.

If the Gulf of California or Sea of Cortez is considered to be separate from the Pacific Ocean, there is a divide which separates the Pacific Ocean basin from the basin which drains into that gulf/sea, i.e the Colorado River basin:

- The Colorado River Divide (not an official name) separates the Colorado River basin which drains to the Gulf of California from the Pacific Ocean basin. It runs between the Continental Divide and Great Basin Divide in Wyoming. It intersects the divides at the respective triple points Three Waters Mountain (Colorado, Columbia, Mississippi at 43°23′13″ N, 109°46′58″ W), and Commissary Ridge Triple Divide (Colorado, Columbia, Great Basin at 42°35′18″ N, 110°44′9″ W. The divide is very short, running only about 90 miles.

=== South America ===
In South America, the Continental Divide of the Americas lies along the Andes. In Central Chile and nearby areas of Argentina the Principal Cordillera makes up the continental divide. This divide forms much of the Argentina–Chile border. In the Miocene the continental divide in the Principal Cordillera was about 20 km to the west of the modern water divide. Subsequent river incision shifted the divide to the east. Compression and uplift in this part of the Andes has continued into the present.

From Lácar Lake and south there are numerous lakes on the eastern slopes that drain to the Pacific, crossing the line of highest peaks. These lakes in Patagonia are moraine-dammed streams, which used to drain to the Atlantic, rather than the Pacific, before the Pleistocene glaciations.

== See also ==
- Bioceanic principle
- Boundary Treaty of 1881 between Chile and Argentina which boundary followed the ridgeline of the Cordillera de los Andes forming part of the Continental Divide of the Americas in South America
- Royal Proclamation of 1763 which followed the Eastern Continental Divide
- Louisiana Purchase whose northern boundary was the Laurentian Divide
- Treaty of 1818 which redefined the U.S./ British Canadian boundary west of the Great Lakes from the Laurentian Divide to the 49th parallel
