= Triple Divide Peak (Montana) =

Mountain in Montana, United States

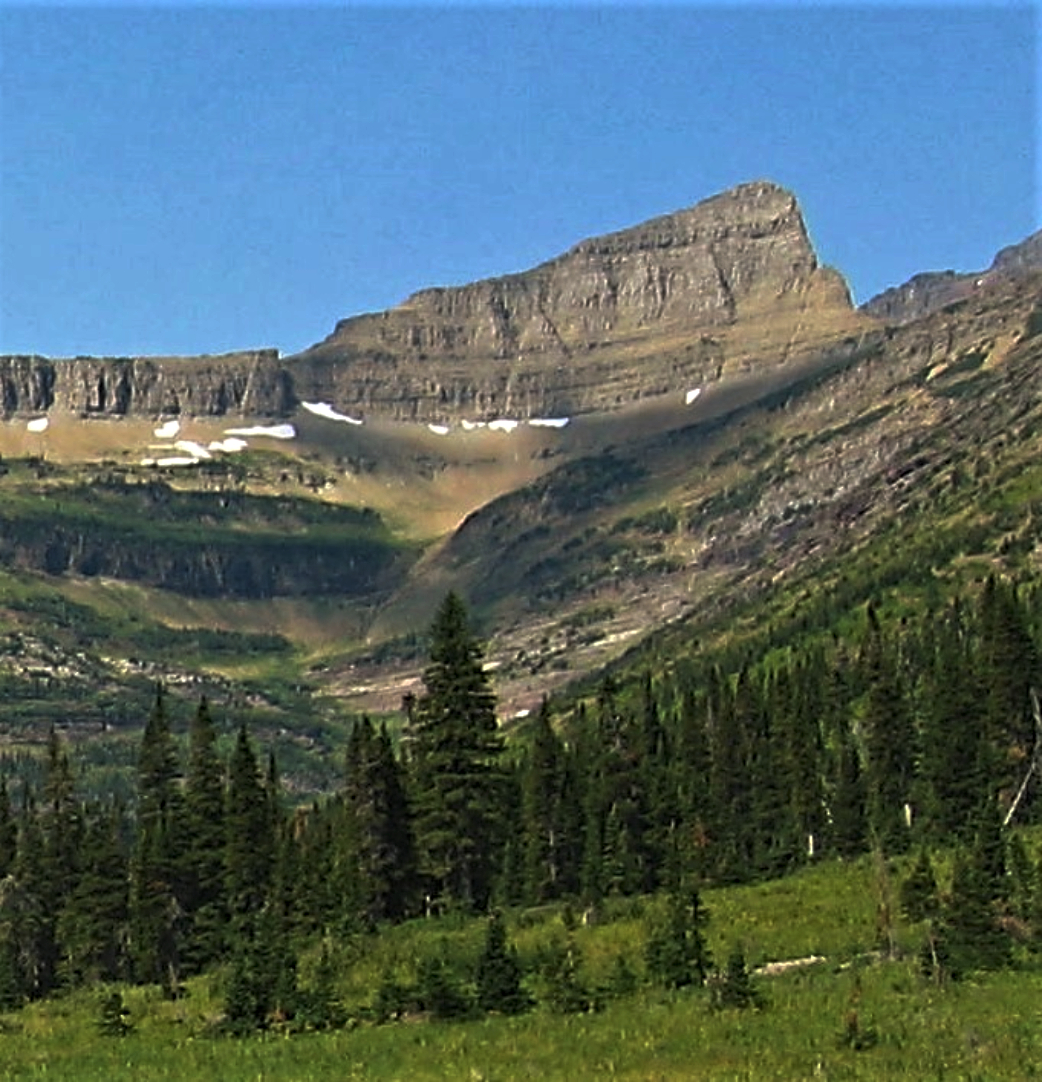
- Triple Divide Peak, east aspect

Highest point
- Elevation: 8,025 ft (2,446 m)
- Prominence: 180 ft (55 m)
- Parent peak: Norris Mountain
- Listing: Mountains in Flathead County; Mountains in Glacier County
- Coordinates: 48°34′23″N 113°31′00″W

Geography
- Location within Montana Location within the United States
- Location: Flathead County, Montana, Glacier County, Montana, U.S.
- Parent range: Lewis Range
- Topo map(s): USGS Mount Stimson, MT

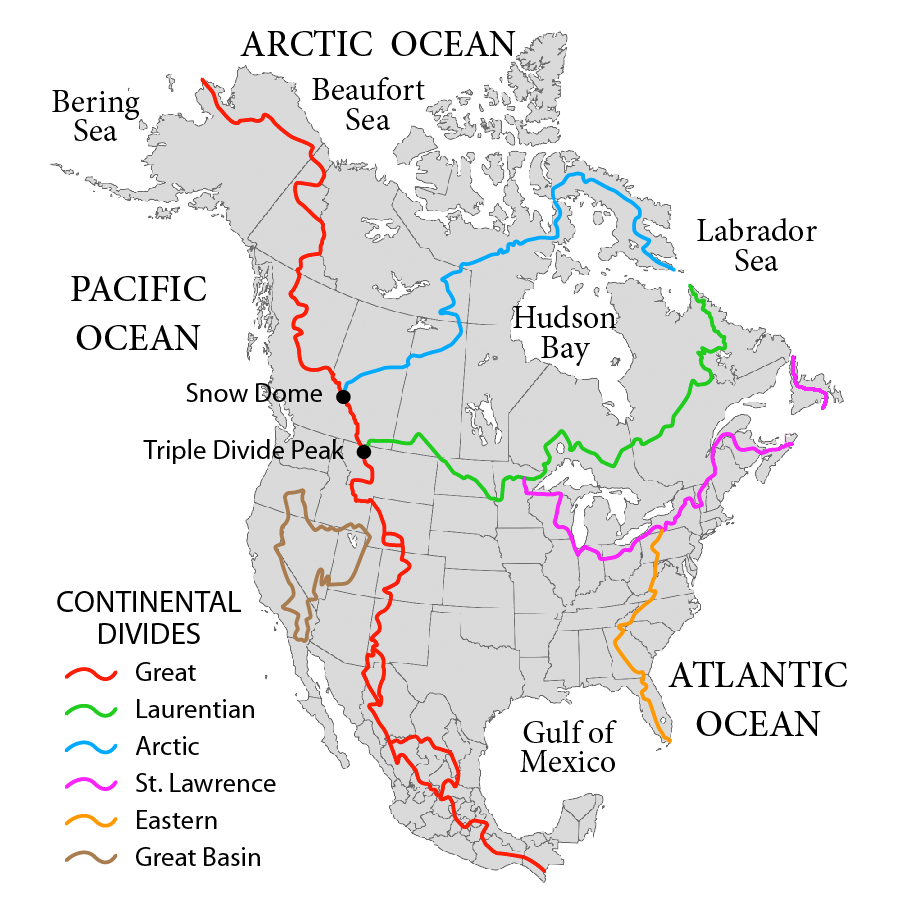
A map of North American drainage basins/divides. Triple Divide Peak is noted at the juncture of the primary North American Continental Divide (red) and Laurentian (green) divides.

Triple Divide Peak (8,025 feet or 2,446 metres) is located in the Lewis Range, part of the Rocky Mountains in North America. The peak is a feature of Glacier National Park in the state of Montana in the United States. The summit of the peak, the hydrological apex of the North American continent, is the point where two of the principal continental divides in North America converge: the Continental Divide of the Americas and the Northern or Laurentian Divide.

== Hydrography ==
Water that falls at the summit can flow either to the Pacific, Atlantic, or Arctic oceans (when Hudson Bay is considered a marginal sea of the Arctic Ocean). The International Hydrographic Organization (in its current unapproved working edition only of Limits of Oceans and Seas) defines the Hudson Bay, with its outlet extending from 62.5 to 66.5 degrees north (just a few miles south of the Arctic Circle) as being part of the Arctic Ocean, specifically "Arctic Ocean Subdivision 9.11."

North America is not the only continent with shores on three different oceans. Asia borders the Arctic, Indian, and Pacific Oceans, as well as the Atlantic Ocean if the Mediterranean and Black Seas are considered parts thereof. Also, Antarctica borders the Atlantic, Indian, and Pacific Oceans if the Southern Ocean is not considered a separate ocean from the former three. However, the inward-draining endorheic basins of Central and Western Asia separate all combinations of 3 of the 4 oceans bordering the continent so that no 3 of their basins meet at a single location. In the case of Antarctica, there is no freely flowing water due to ice sheets and permafrost. So Triple Divide Peak is the only single point on Earth from which water flows into three distinct oceans. Some sources consider Hudson Bay to be part of the Atlantic. Under this stipulation, because the bay is fed by drainage from Triple Divide Peak, Snow Dome, which is the triple divide between Hudson Bay, the Arctic Ocean, and Pacific Ocean, is world’s sole hydrological apex.

Rainfall on the southwestern side of the peak enters Pacific Creek, which in turn enters Nyack Creek, the Middle Fork of the Flathead River, the Flathead River through Flathead Lake, the Clark Fork River into Pend Oreille Lake, the Pend Oreille River, and the Columbia River which empties into the Pacific near Astoria, Oregon.

The northern slope of the mountain sheds water into Hudson Bay Creek, which then drains into Medicine Owl Creek and Red Eagle Creek. It then empties into Saint Mary Lake, which feeds the St. Mary River, which in turn flows into the Oldman River, the South Saskatchewan River, the Saskatchewan River, and the Lake Winnipeg system, drained by the Nelson River which empties into Hudson Bay.

Moisture on the southeastern slopes feeds into Atlantic Creek, which in turn enters the North Fork of Cut Bank Creek, Cut Bank Creek, the Marias River, and the Missouri River which joins the Mississippi River before emptying into the Atlantic's Gulf of Mexico near New Orleans.

== Geology ==
The Lewis Range was formed in the Lewis Overthrust, some 59–75 million years ago, when an enormous slab of Precambrian rock faulted and slid over younger rocks from the Cretaceous period.

== Gallery ==
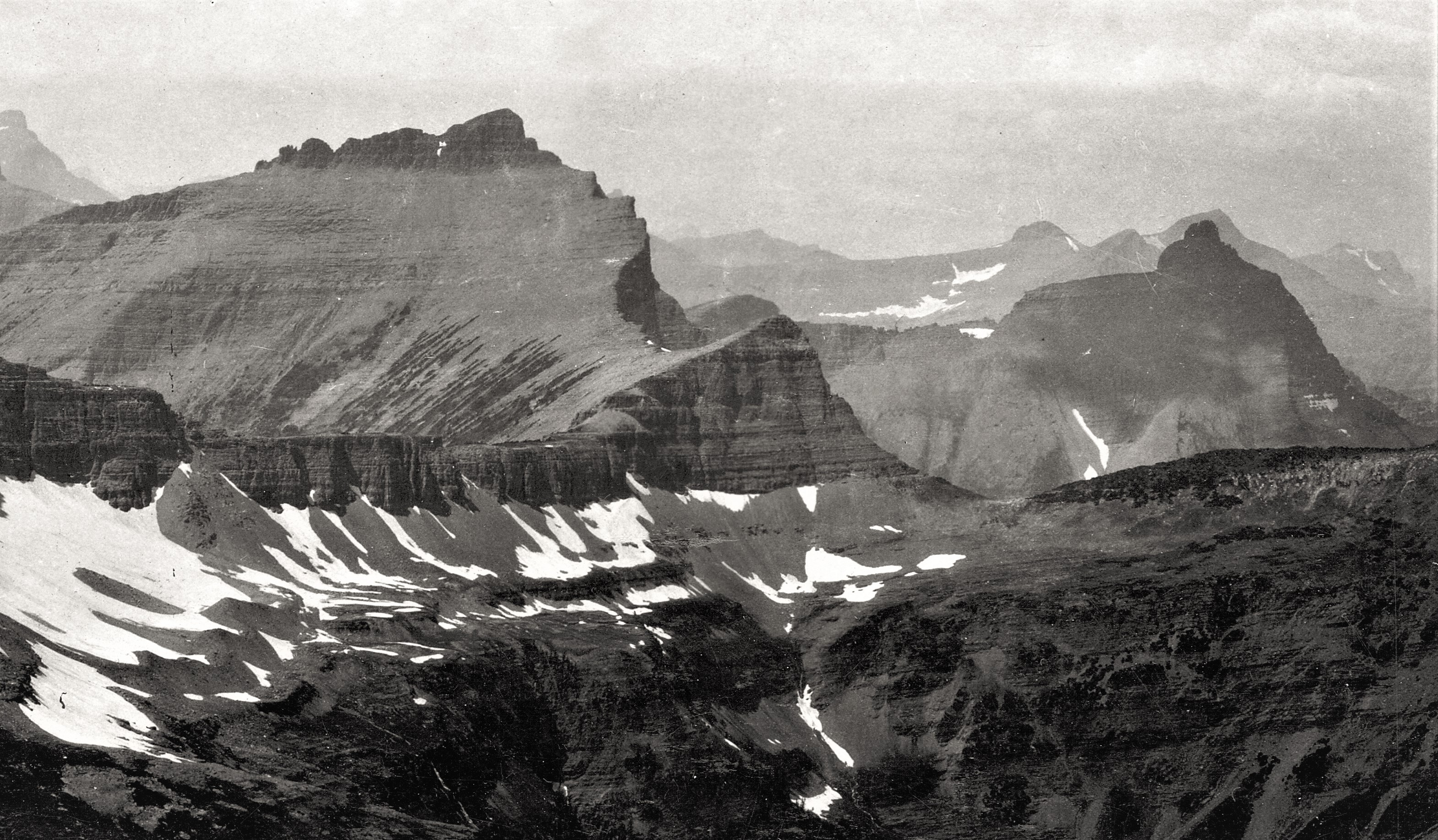
The small Triple Divide Peak (centered) with Norris Mountain on left and Split Mountain to right.

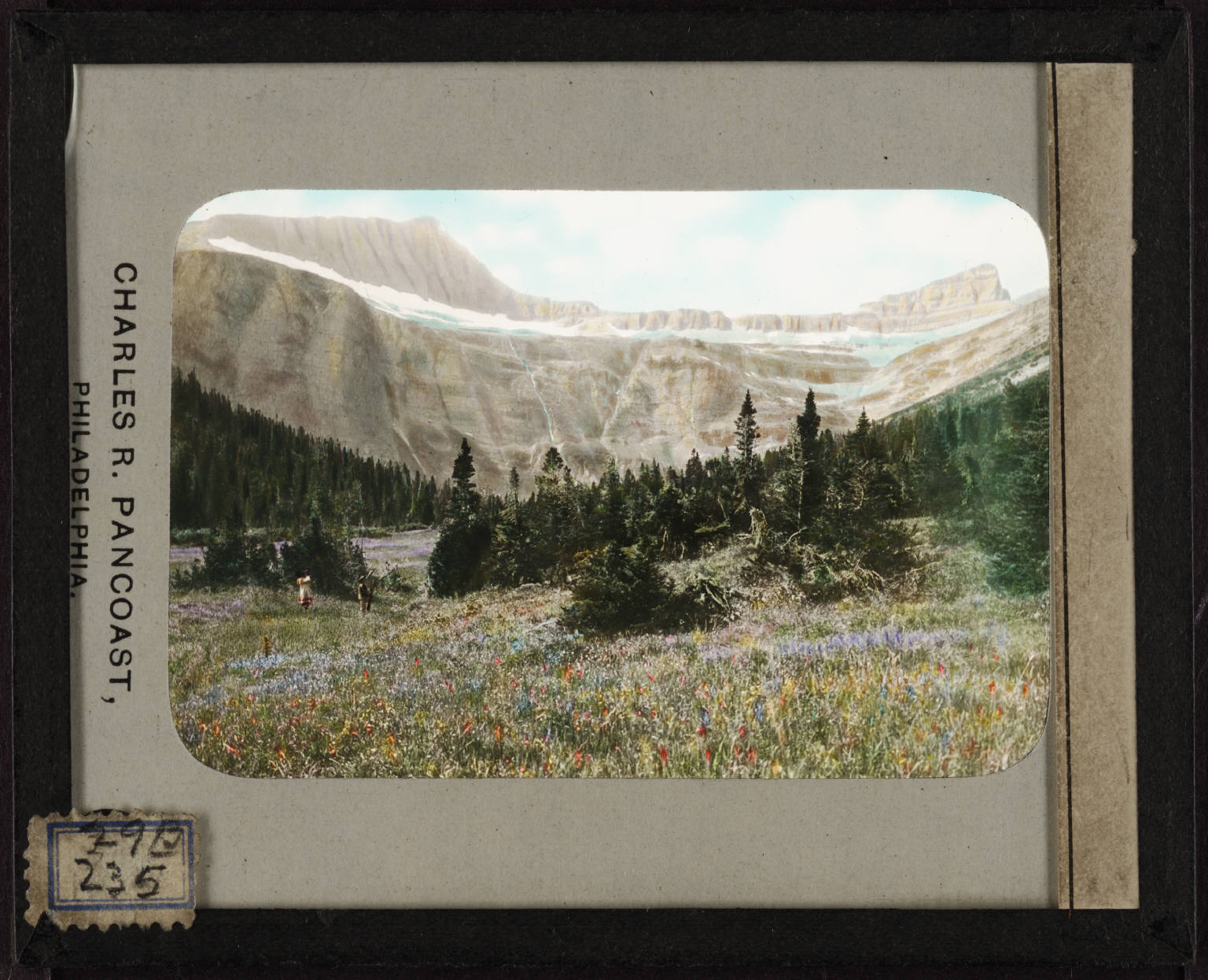
Triple Divide Peak upper right
(Razoredge Mountain upper left)

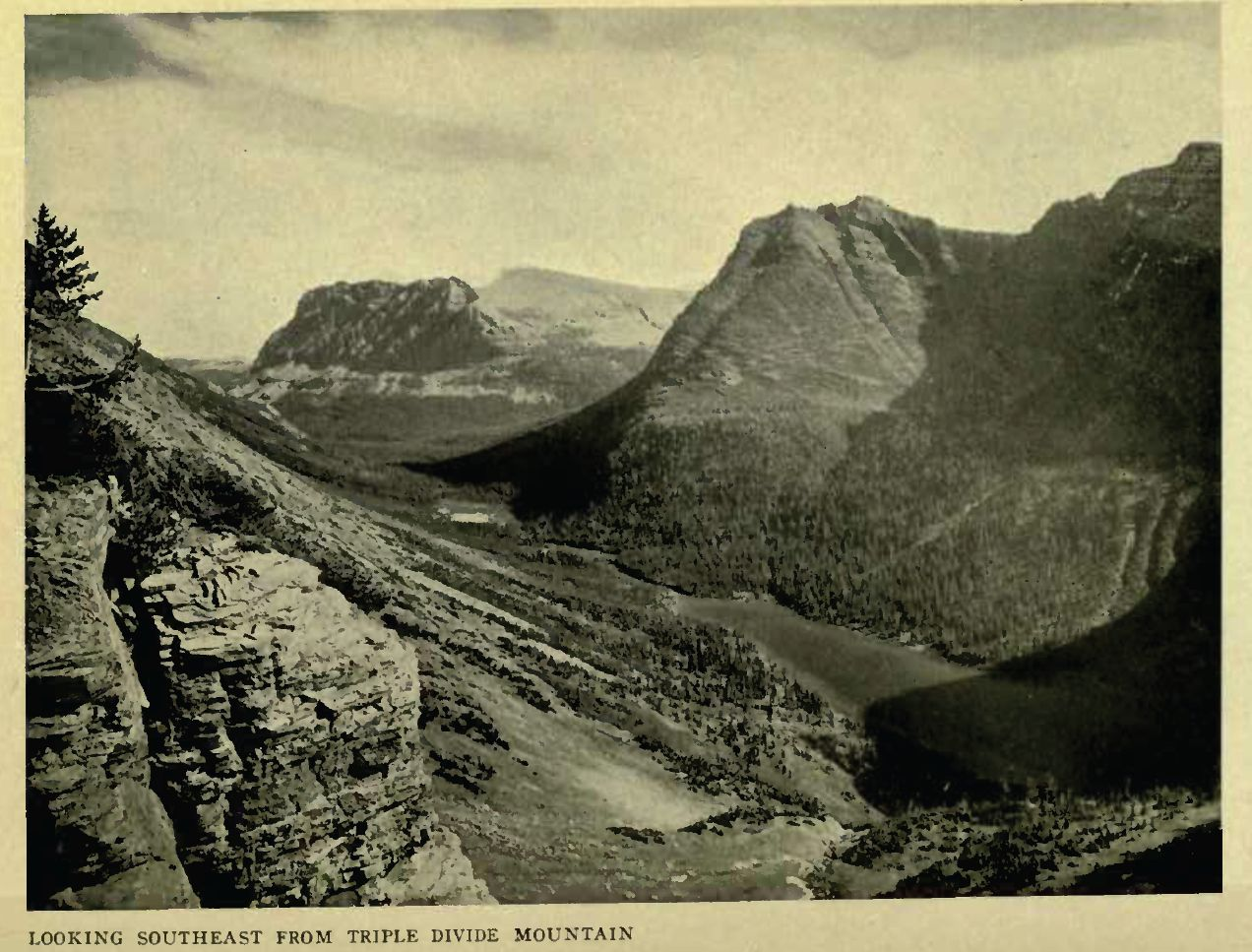
Looking south from Triple Divide Mountain, 1917.
Bad Marriage Mountain (left of center) and Medicine Grizzly Peak right

== See also ==
- List of mountains and mountain ranges of Glacier National Park (U.S.)
