= Norris Mountain =

Mountain in Montana, United States

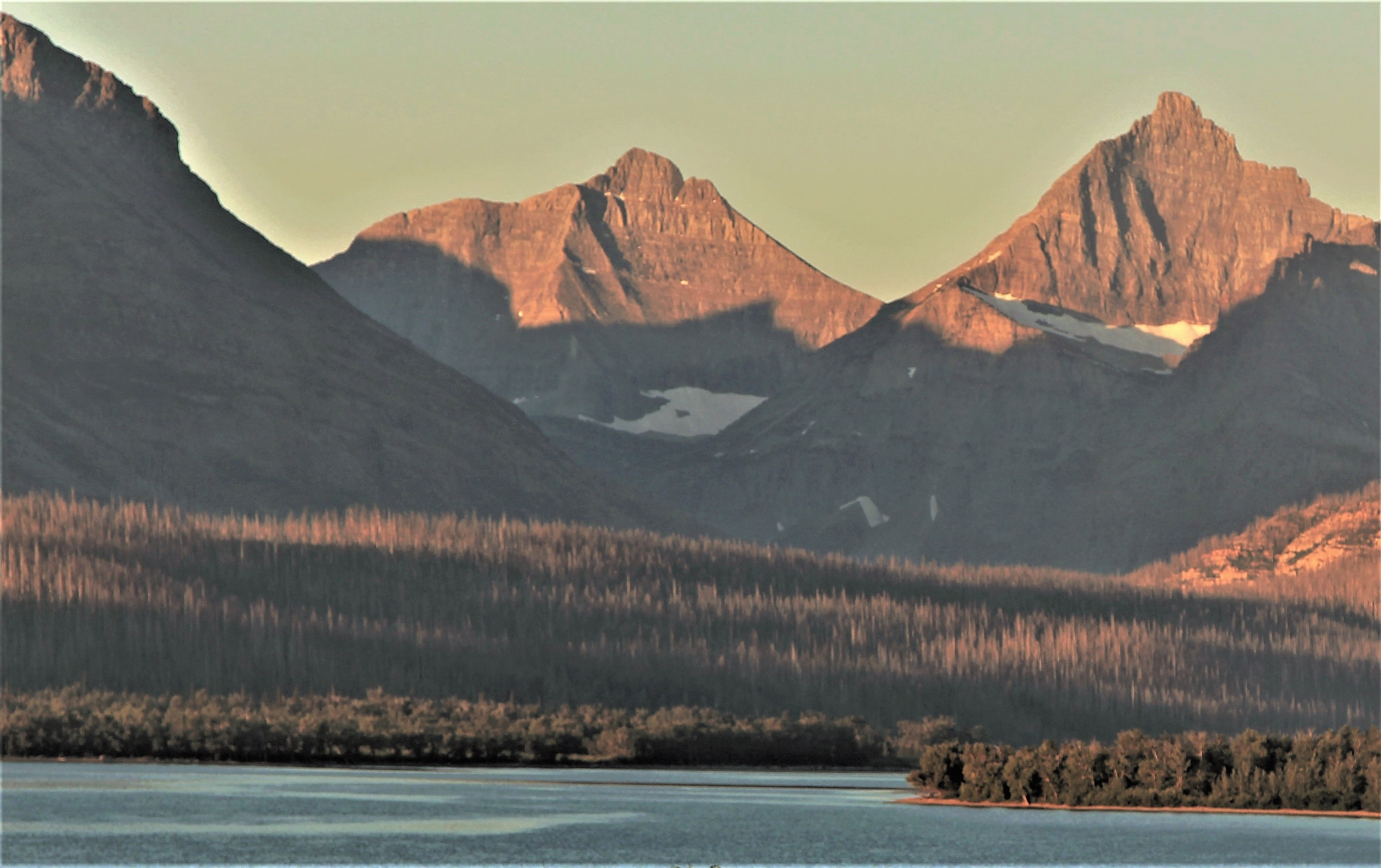
- North aspect, centered (Split Mountain to right)

Highest point
- Elevation: 8,887 ft (2,709 m)
- Prominence: 1,282 ft (391 m)
- Parent peak: Flinsch Peak (9,225 ft)
- Isolation: 1.98 mi (3.19 km)
- Coordinates: 48°34′37″N 113°32′01″W

Geography
- Location within Montana Location within the United States
- Location: Glacier National Park; Glacier County / Flathead County; Montana, U.S.
- Parent range: Lewis Range
- Topo map(s): USGS Mount Stimson, MT

Climbing
- Easiest route: class 3

Norris Mountain (8,887 feet (2,709 m)) is located in the Lewis Range, Glacier National Park in the U.S. state of Montana. Norris Mountain is situated along the Continental Divide; it is the parent of Triple Divide Peak—the point at which North America's Arctic, Atlantic, and Pacific drainage basins converge—located 0.8 miles (1.3 km) east-southeast.

== Climate ==
Based on the Köppen climate classification, it is located in an alpine subarctic climate zone with long, cold, snowy winters, and cool to warm summers. Temperatures can drop below −10 °F with wind chill factors below −30 °F.

== Geology ==
Like other mountains in Glacier National Park, it is composed of sedimentary rock laid down during the Precambrian to Jurassic periods. Formed in shallow seas, this sedimentary rock was initially uplifted beginning 170 million years ago when the Lewis Overthrust fault pushed an enormous slab of precambrian rocks 3 mi (4.8 km) thick, 50 miles (80 km) wide and 160 miles (260 km) long over younger rock of the cretaceous period.

== See also ==
- Mountains and mountain ranges of Glacier National Park (U.S.)

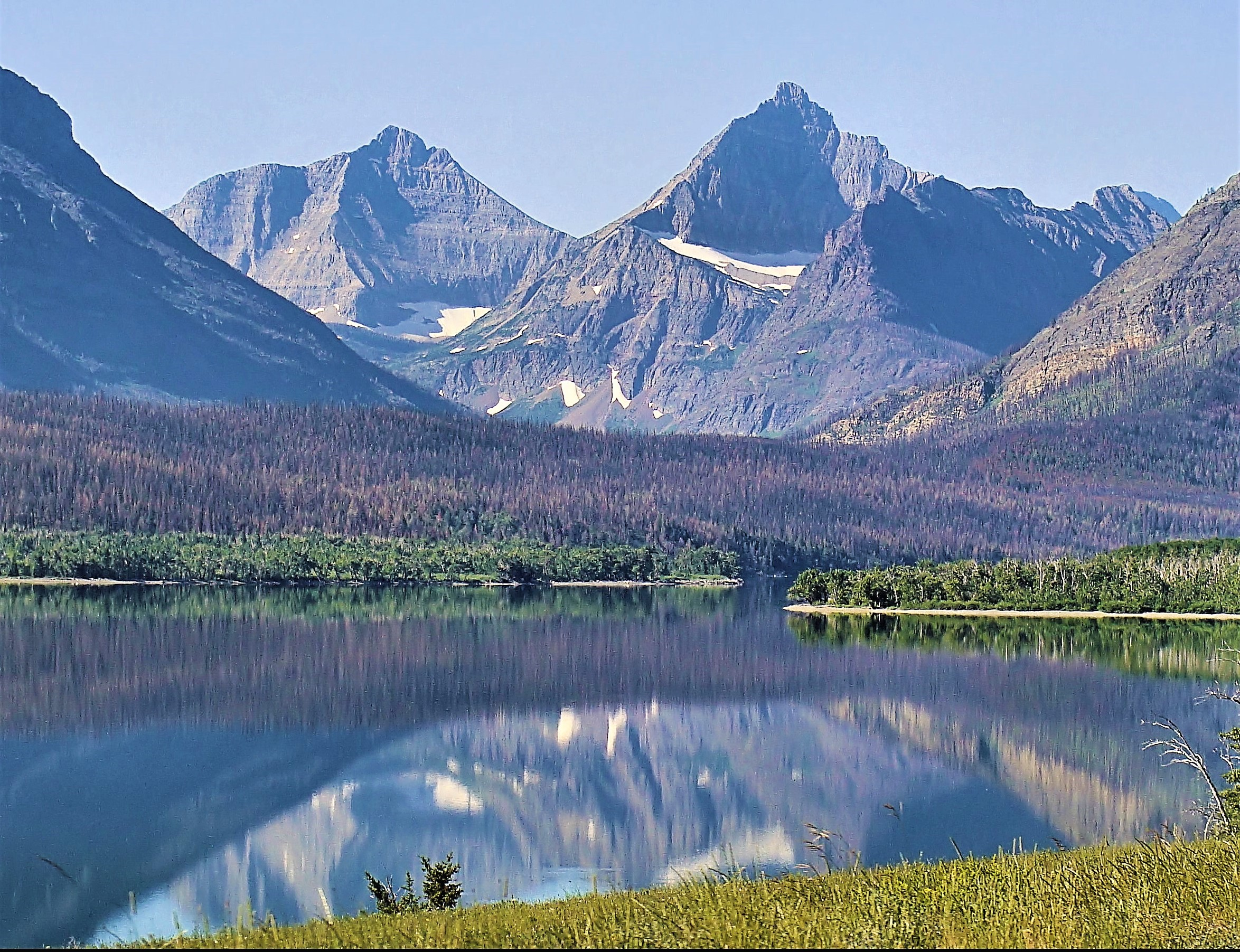
Norris (left) and Split Mountain from St Mary Lake
