= Triple divide =

Point where three drainage basins meet

Map showing worldwide drainage basins and triple divides

A triple divide or triple watershed is a point on Earth's surface where three drainage basins meet. A triple divide results from the intersection of three drainage divides. Triple divides range from prominent mountain peaks to minor side peaks, down to simple slope changes on a ridge which are otherwise unremarkable. The elevation of a triple divide can be thousands of meters to barely above sea level. Triple divides are a common hydrographic feature of any terrain that has rivers, streams and/or lakes.

Topographic triple divides do not necessarily respect the underground path of water. Thus, depending on the infiltration and the different geological layers, the hydrologic triple divide is often offset from the topographic triple divide.

A hydrological apex is a triple divide whose waters flow into three different oceans. Depending on definition, Triple Divide Peak in the U.S. state of Montana, or Snow Dome in Canada are the only such places on Earth. (Note: Sources disagree on whether Hudson Bay is part of the Atlantic Ocean or the Arctic Ocean. If Hudson Bay is considered to be part of the Atlantic ocean, then the apex is at Snow Dome, while if Hudson Bay is considered to be part of the Arctic Ocean, then the apex is at Triple Divide Peak.)

== Africa ==
An unnamed hill on the border between the Central African Republic and South Sudan: the exact point is at 09°08′24″N 23°28′07″E. Water from this point flows to the Atlantic Ocean via the Congo River, to the Mediterranean Sea via the Nile, or to endorheic Lake Chad. At this point meet the second, third and eighth largest drainage basins in the world, making it one of the most important triple divides on earth.

Africa does not have a unique hydrological apex because the Mediterranean–Indian divide splits around the endorheic basins of the East African Rift. The Congo–Nile Divide and the Atlantic–Indian divides both end at the endorheic basin of Lake Eyasi in Tanzania and do not meet each other.

== Antarctica ==
Antarctica is completely encircled by the Southern Ocean, and has no triple divides.

Older definitions of the oceans did not include the Southern Ocean, and instead had the Atlantic, Pacific and Indian Oceans touch the shores of Antarctica. Based on this outdated definition, Dome Argus is the highest point in the East Antarctic ice sheet and could be considered a triple divide if it is assumed that the ice forms a watershed. (80°22′S 77°21′E)

== Asia ==
Asia features several endorheic basins. In Northeastern Mongolia, the endorheic basin meets the watersheds of the Selenga and the Amur, rivers that flow to the Arctic and the Pacific Ocean, respectively. In Tibet, the basin meets the watersheds of the Nu and the Yangtze, rivers that flow to the Indian and the Pacific Ocean, respectively.

== Australia ==
Australia has two continental drainage divide tripoints, close to each other along Queensland's Great Dividing Range. Both are named after two 1845 exploration party leaders who sought to solve the question of Australia's rivers: Thomas Mitchell and Edmund Kennedy.

- Mitchell Junction is in North Queensland, on Triple C Pastoral Station, near the White Mountains National Park. Water falling on the tripoint can flow either to
  - the Pacific Ocean via the Burdekin River,
  - to the Indian Ocean, via the Flinders River flowing to the Gulf of Carpentaria and the Indonesian Throughflow,
  - and lastly to Lake Eyre via Cooper Creek. approximately 20°20′58″S 145°03′17″E
- Kennedy Junction is in Central Queensland, on Caldervale Station, near Carnarvon National Park. Water falling on the tripoint can flow either
  - to the Pacific Ocean via the Fitzroy River,
  - to the Southern Ocean, via Murray/Darling River, and
  - to Lake Eyre via Cooper Creek. 24°55′22″S 146°49′27″E

== Europe ==
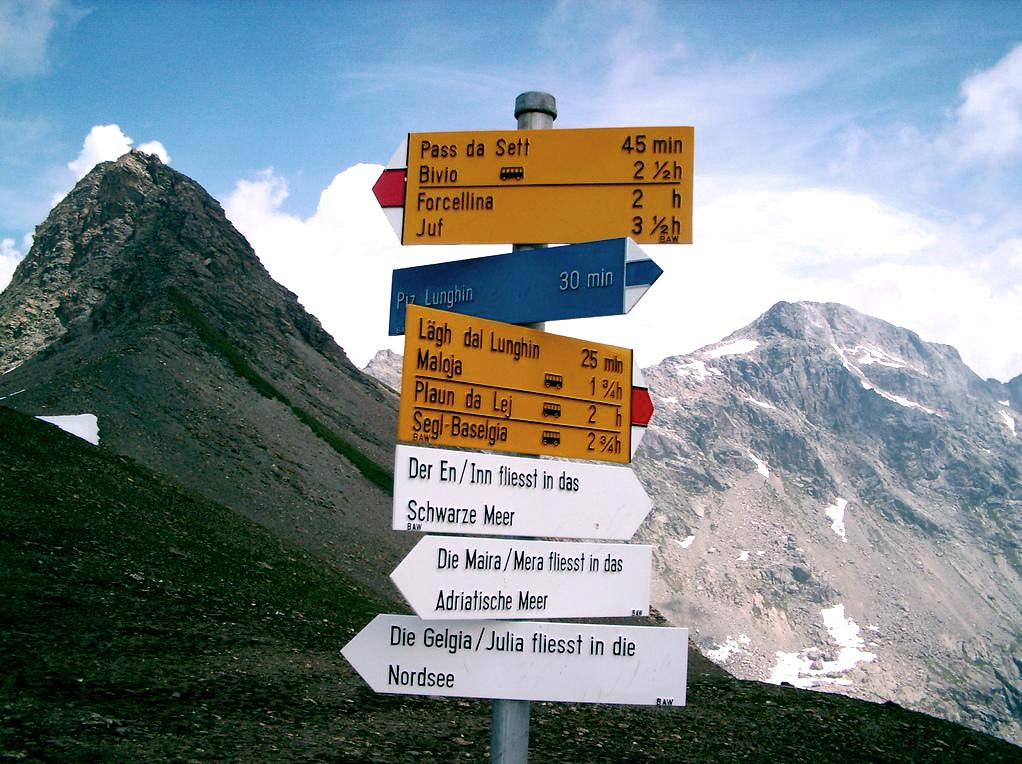
Landmark at Lunghin Pass in Grisons, Switzerland.

Landmark name	Coordinates	Location	Watersheds	Divides	Refs
Lunghin Pass	46°24′48.71″N 9°39′48.53″E	Piz Lunghin, Switzerland	North Sea (Rhine); Black Sea (Danube); Mediterranean Sea (Po)		
Klepáč	50°09′27.01″N 16°47′27″E	Králický Sněžník Mountains, Czech Republic and Poland	North Sea (Orlice to Elbe); Black Sea (Morava to Danube); Baltic Sea (Eastern Neisse to Oder)		
Unnamed point	47°56′29.2″N 5°30′17.2″E	Langres, France	North Sea (Meuse to Rhine); English Channel (Seine); Mediterranean Sea (Tille to Saône to Rhône)		
Witenwasserenstock	46°31′41.9″N 8°28′27.3″E	Valais and Uri, Switzerland	North Sea (Rhine); Adriatic Sea (Po); Mediterranean Sea (Rhône)		
Roundway Hill	51°22′39.0″N 1°59′08.2″W	Devizes, Wiltshire, United Kingdom	North Sea (River Kennet to the Thames); English Channel (Hampshire Avon); Atlantic Ocean (Bristol Avon to the Severn)		

== North America ==
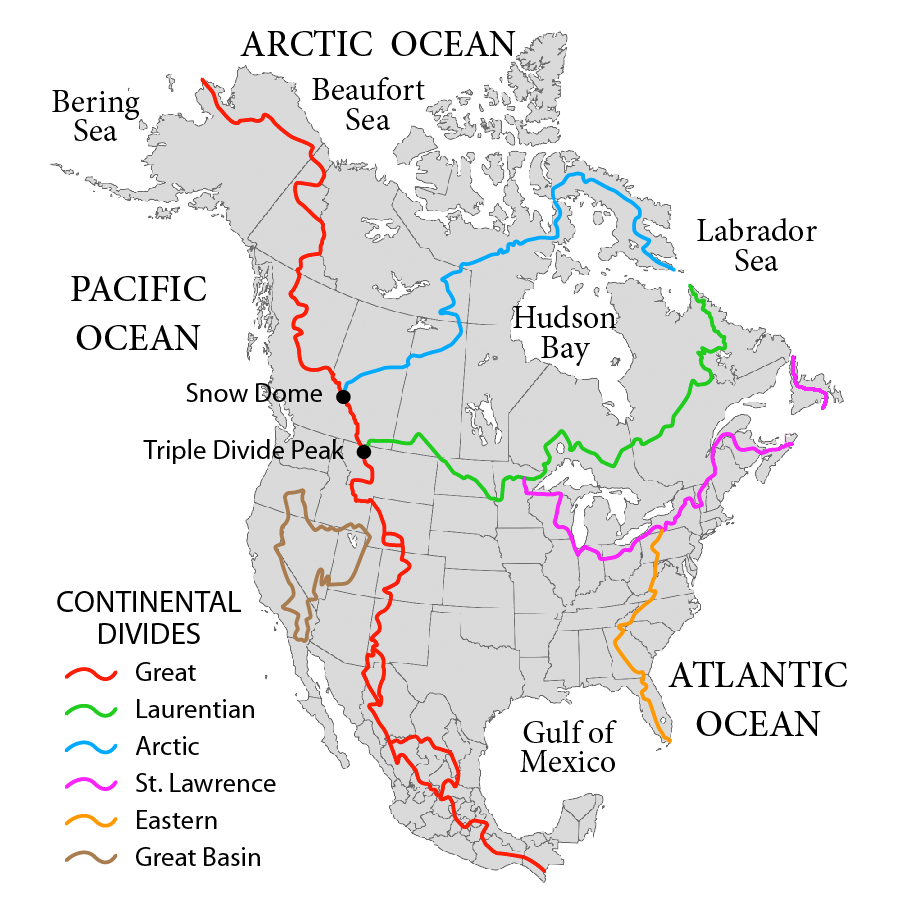
Triple Divide Peak and Snow Dome are the major triple divides of North America

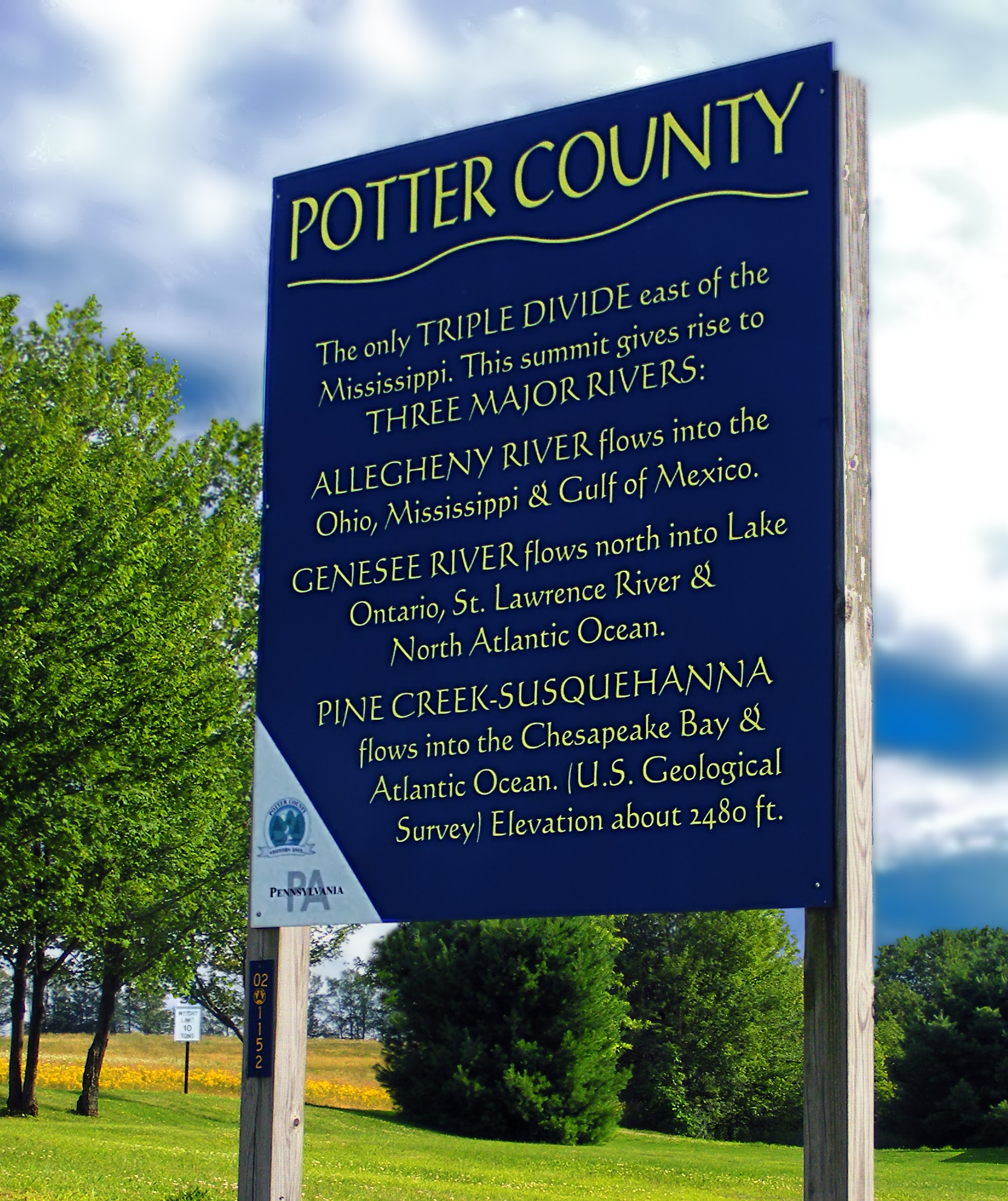
Landmark at the triple divide in Potter County, Pennsylvania.

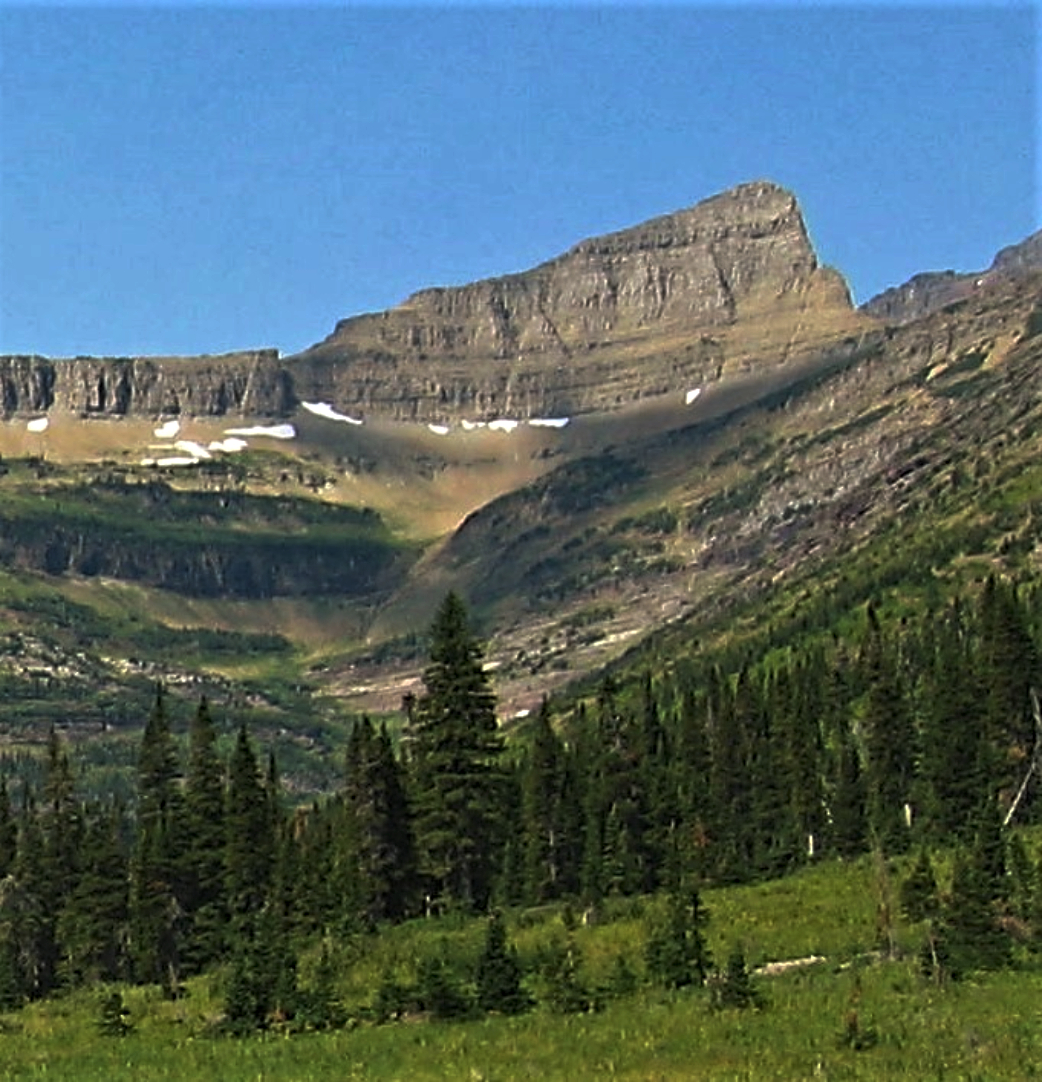
Triple Divide Peak, Montana

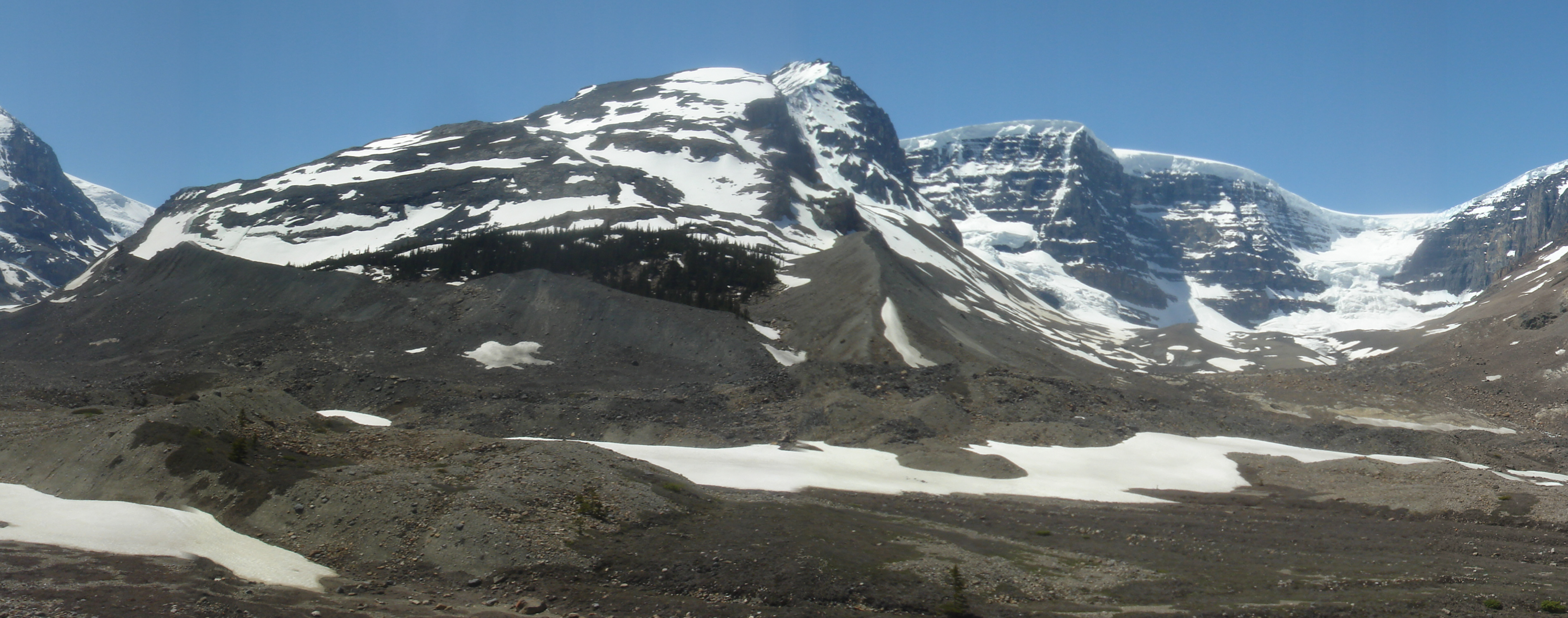
Snow Dome, British Columbia

North America has three triple divides in the United States which are intersections of continental divides, and a fourth one in Canada. Waters at these triple divides flow into three different oceans, seas or gulfs. Triple Divide Peak in Montana is considered the triple divide "hydrological apex" of North America, though Snow Dome on the Alberta-British Columbia border also has a claim depending on how the Arctic and Atlantic Oceans are defined. North America is the only continent that has a triple point dividing basins draining into three different oceans. Where the Continental Divide splits and joins to form the boundary of the Great Divide Basin, it forms two triple points.

Triple divides of North America
Landmark name	Coordinates	Location	Watersheds	Divides	Refs
Triple Divide Peak	48°34′23″N 113°31′00″W	Flathead County, Montana	Pacific Ocean (Columbia River); Atlantic Ocean (Mississippi River to Gulf of Mexico); Hudson Bay (Nelson River)	Continental Divide of the Americas and Laurentian Divide	
Snow Dome	52°11′13″N 117°19′01″W	Alberta and British Columbia	Pacific Ocean (Columbia River); Arctic Ocean (Mackenzie River); Hudson Bay (Nelson River)	Continental Divide of the Americas and Arctic Divide	
Unnamed hill	41°50′48″N 77°50′14″W	Potter County, Pennsylvania	Gulf of Mexico (Allegheny River); Atlantic Ocean (Susquehanna River); Saint Lawrence River (Genesee River to Lake Ontario)	Eastern Continental Divide and Saint Lawrence River Divide	
Hill of Three Waters	47°28′20″N 92°57′50″W	approximately 3.2 km (2 mi) north of Hibbing, Minnesota	Hudson Bay (Shannon River (Minnesota) to Nelson River); Gulf of Mexico (Prairie River (Mississippi River tributary); Saint Lawrence River (East Swan River)	Saint Lawrence River Divide and Laurentian Divide	
Eastern divide termination	30°15.146′N 082°23.578′W)	Around Haines City, Florida	Kissimmee River (Lake Marion Creek); St John's River (Ocklahawa River); Peace River	Lake Okeechobee basin and the Eastern Continental Divide	
Great Divide Basin	42°00′01″N 107°59′02″W	Wyoming, where the Continental Divide splits and joins to form the boundary of the Great Divide Basin	Pacific Ocean (Green River); Atlantic Ocean (North Platte; Great Divide Basin	Continental Divide of the Americas, Great Divide Basin	
Guzmán Basin	33°08′34″N 107°51′16″W	Reeds Peak, New Mexico (Note: Where the Continental Divide splits in New Mexico and joins in Chihuahua, Mexico, to form the boundary of Guzman Basin are two triple points.)	Pacific Ocean (Colorado); Gulf of Mexico (Rio Grande); Guzmán Basin	Continental Divide of the Americas, Great Divide Basin	
Chihuahua rim, Guzmán Basin	31°19′56.9″N 108°45′21.5″W	Chihuahua, Mexico	Pacific Ocean (Colorado); Gulf of Mexico (Rio Grande); Guzmán Basin	Continental Divide of the Americas, Great Divide Basin	
Three Waters Mountain	43°23′37″N 109°47′09″W	Wyoming	Gulf of California (Colorado); Pacific Ocean (Columbia); Gulf of Mexico (Mississippi)	Continental Divide of the Americas, Unnamed Divide	
Commissary Ridge triple divide	42°35′18″N 110°44′09″W	Wyoming	Gulf of California (Colorado); Pacific Ocean (Columbia); Great Basin		

Other points are often considered to be triple divides because they separate basins of continental rivers.

- Headwaters Hill in Saguache County, Colorado, near Chester (Arkansas River, Rio Grande River, Colorado River). This point has only a weak claim to being a continental triple divide because both the Rio Grande and Arkansas Rivers flow into the Gulf of Mexico. (38°20′52″N 106°15′11″W)

The highest elevation (4,040 m or 13,240 ft) significant triple divide in the lower 48 states of the United States, in Kings Canyon National Park in Fresno/Inyo counties, California, is a sub-peak of Mount Wallace of the central Sierra Nevada:

- Crumbly Spire or Mount Wallace South Peak, Fresno/Inyo counties, California (Tulare Lake via Kings River, Owens Lake via Owens River, Pacific Ocean via San Joaquin River) (37°08′28″N 118°39′15″W)

Numerous other triple divide points result from intersection of river basin divides, including:

- Young Lick Knob, Georgia (Savannah, Apalachicola, Mississippi) (34°49′22″N 83°39′09″W)

== South America ==
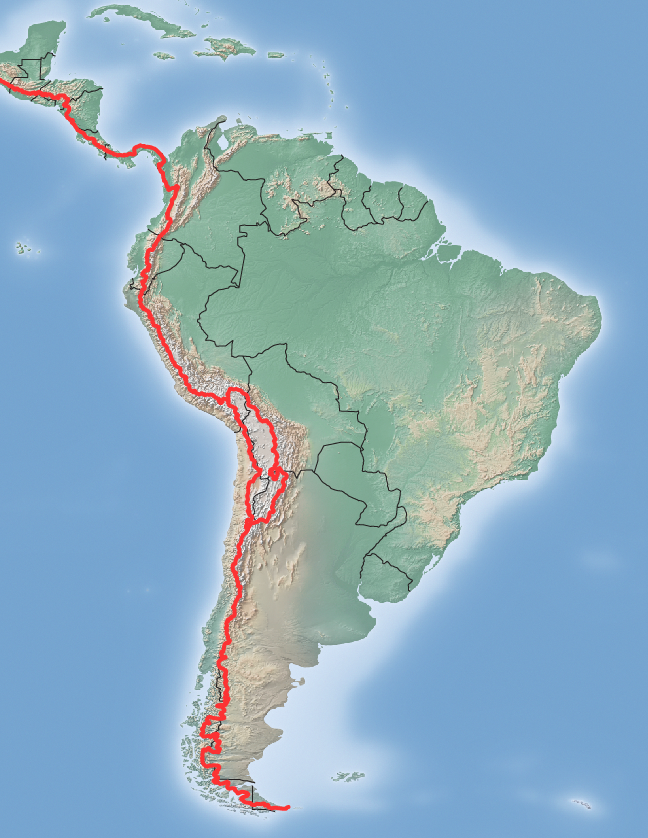
Continental divide of the Americas in South America

The Colombian Massif drains into the Caribbean Sea via the Magdalena and Cauca Rivers, the Atlantic Ocean via the Caquetá River in the Amazon basin, and the Pacific Ocean via the Patía River.

== See also ==
- Continental divide

== Citations ==
- Joseph A. DiPietro (2012-12-21). Landscape Evolution in the United States: An Introduction to the Geography, Geology, and Natural History. Newnes.
