= Three Waters Mountain =

Mountain in Wyoming, United States

- Location within Wyoming Location within the United States

Highest point
- Elevation: 11,685 ft (3,562 m)
- Prominence: 680 ft (210 m)
- Coordinates: 43°23′37″N 109°47′09″W

Geography
- Location: Sublette County, Wyoming U.S.
- Parent range: Wind River Range
- Topo map: USGS Union Peak

Climbing
- Easiest route: Scramble

Three Waters Mountain (11,685 ft (3,562 m)) is located in the northern Wind River Range in the U.S. state of Wyoming. Three Waters Mountain straddles the Continental Divide and is in both Bridger-Teton and Shoshone National Forests. The mountain receives its name from being the triple point between the watersheds of the Colorado, Columbia, and Mississippi Rivers.

== Hazards ==
Encountering bears is a concern in the Wind River Range. There are other concerns as well, including bugs, wildfires, adverse snow conditions and nighttime cold temperatures.

Importantly, there have been notable incidents, including accidental deaths, due to falls from steep cliffs (a misstep could be fatal in this class 4/5 terrain) and due to falling rocks, over the years, including 1993, 2007 (involving an experienced NOLS leader), 2015 and 2018. Other incidents include a seriously injured backpacker being airlifted near SquareTop Mountain in 2005, and a fatal hiker incident (from an apparent accidental fall) in 2006 that involved state search and rescue. The U.S. Forest Service does not offer updated aggregated records on the official number of fatalities in the Wind River Range.
