= Young Lick =

Mountain in Georgia, United States

Young lick
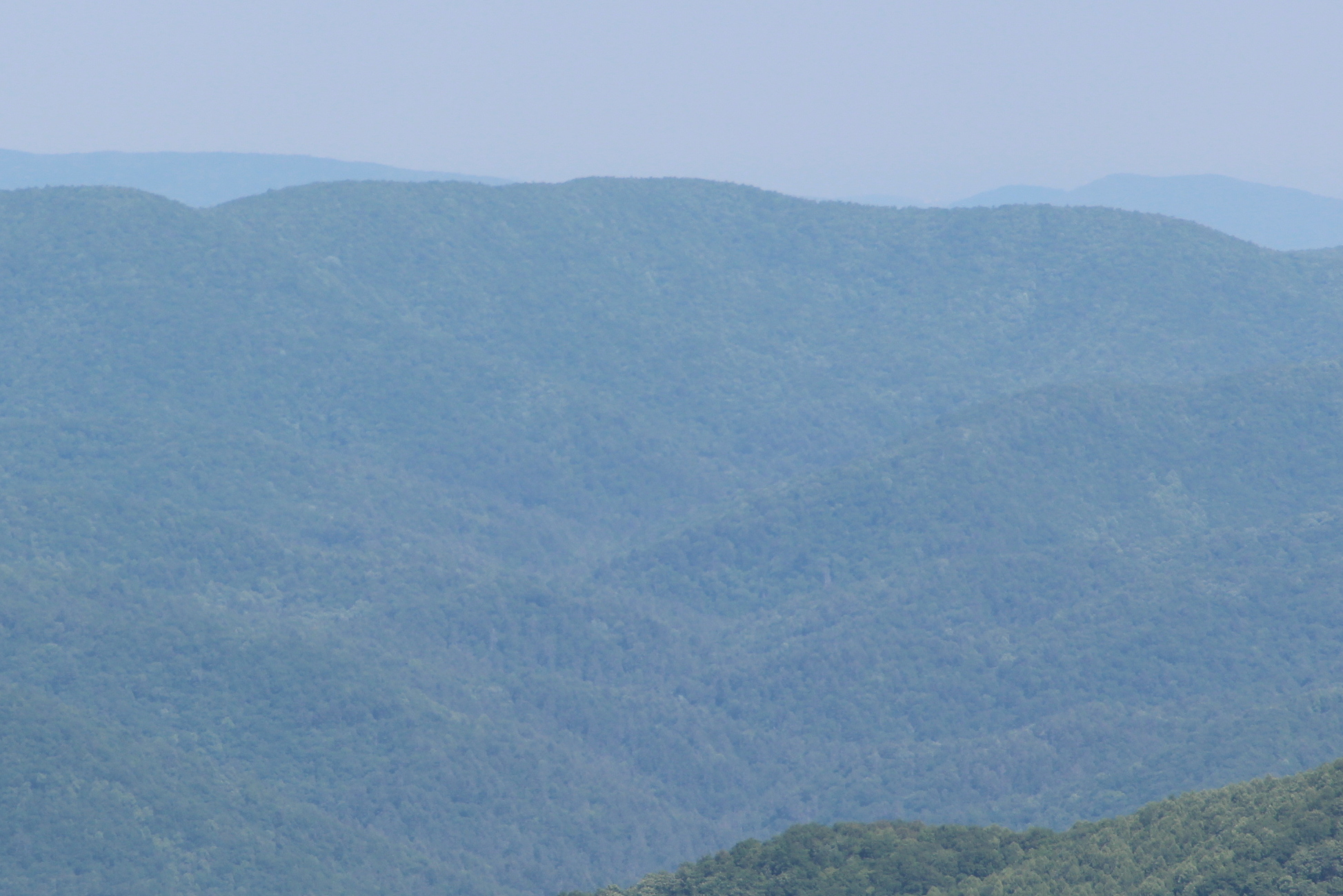
- Young Lick viewed from Brasstown Bald

Highest point
- Elevation: 3,809 ft (1,161 m)
- Prominence: 280 ft (85 m)
- Coordinates: 34°49′22″N 83°39′09″W

Geography
- Location: Habersham, Rabun and Towns counties, Georgia, U.S.A.
- Parent range: Blue Ridge Mountains
- Topo map: USGS Tray Mountain

Climbing
- Easiest route: Hike

Young Lick is a mountain that lies in three Georgia counties, Habersham, Rabun and Towns. Its summit - Young Lick Knob, elevation 3,809 feet (1,161 m), is one of Habersham County's highest points. Young Lick Knob is crossed by the Appalachian Trail.

The peak is geographically significant for two reasons. First, it marks the point where Habersham, Rabun and Towns counties meet. More importantly, Young Lick is a "triple-divide" peak on the Eastern Continental Divide, with rainfall from its summit flowing into three completely separate major basins. To the northeast of the peak, water flows into the headwaters of the Savannah River and into the Atlantic Ocean. To the southeast, water flows directly into the Gulf of Mexico via the Chattahoochee, then Apalachicola rivers. To the west, water also flows to the Gulf, but it follows a less direct route via the Hiawassee, Tennessee, Ohio, and Mississippi river systems.

== See also ==
- Knob Lick, Missouri

== Sources ==
- Georgia's Named Summits - Habersham County
