= Snow Dome (Canada) =

Mountain on the border of Alberta and British Columbia, Canada

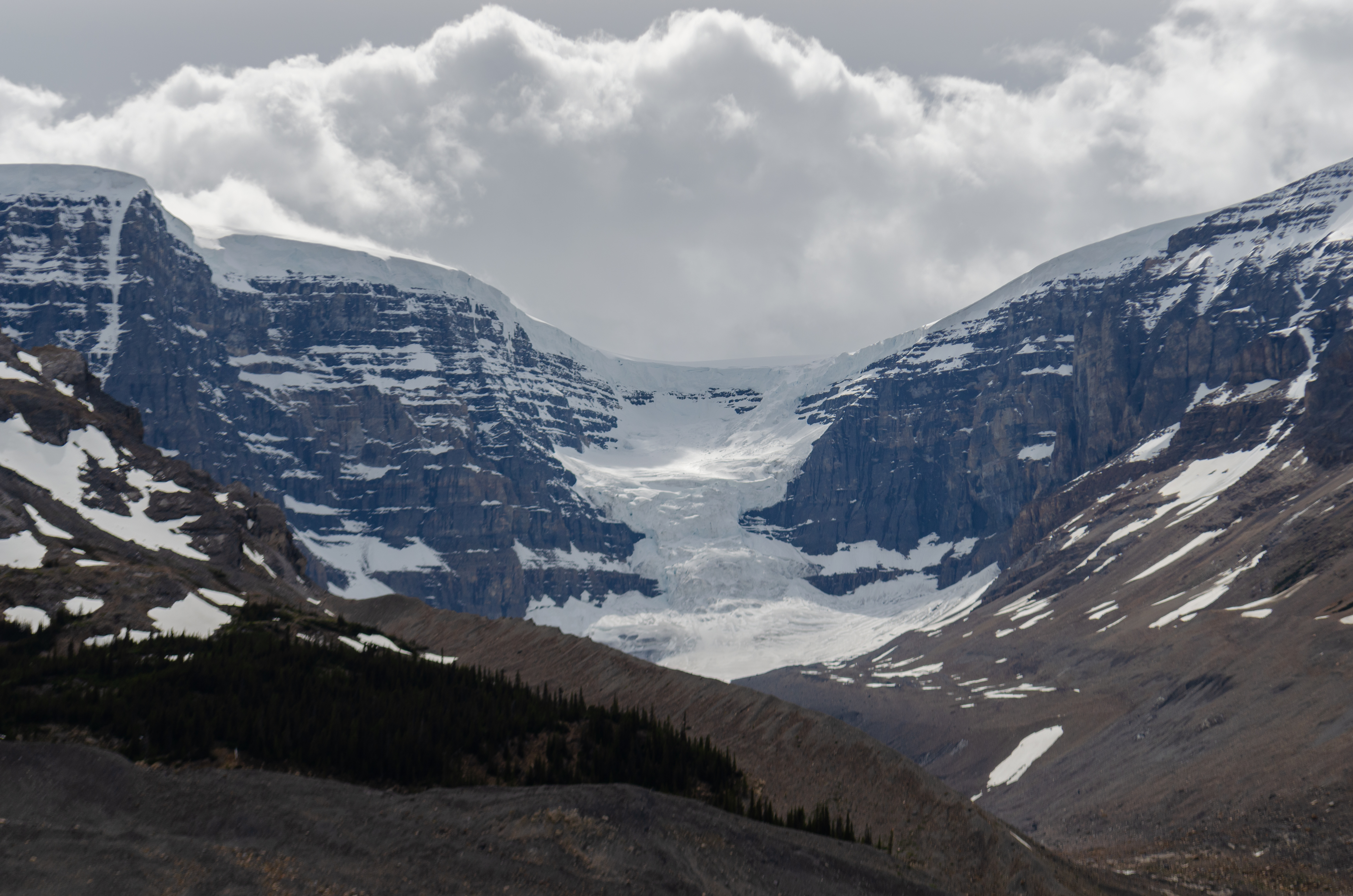
- Snow Dome and Dome Glacier seen from the Icefields Parkway

Highest point
- Elevation: 3,520 m (11,550 ft)
- Prominence: 376 m (1,234 ft)
- Listing: Mountains of Alberta; Mountains of British Columbia
- Coordinates: 52°11′13″N 117°19′01″W

Geography
- Location within Alberta Location within British Columbia Location within Canada
- Location: Alberta-British Columbia, Canada
- Parent range: Winston Churchill Range
- Topo map: NTS 83C3 Columbia Icefield

Climbing
- First ascent: 1898 by J. Norman Collie, Hugh Stutfield, Herman Woolley
- Easiest route: snow/glacier climb

Snow Dome is a mountain located on the Continental Divide in the Columbia Icefield, where the boundary of Banff National Park and Jasper National Park meets the border of Alberta and British Columbia in Canada. The summit's elevation is 3,456 m (11,339 ft).

The mountain was named in 1898 by J. Norman Collie because its permanently snow- and ice-capped massif resembles a dome.

The mountain is one of two hydrological apexes of North America; it is a major triple divide between three great drainage basins. Water falling on Snow Dome's summit may flow into streams that drain into the Pacific Ocean (via the Bush River and the Columbia River), the Arctic Ocean (via the Athabasca River), and Hudson Bay (via the North Saskatchewan River). The Dome Glacier flows to the north-east, the Stutfield Glacier to the north-west, the Columbia Glacier to the west and Athabasca Glacier flows to the east of the mountain. The other apex is Triple Divide Peak in Glacier National Park, Montana, United States.

== Gallery ==
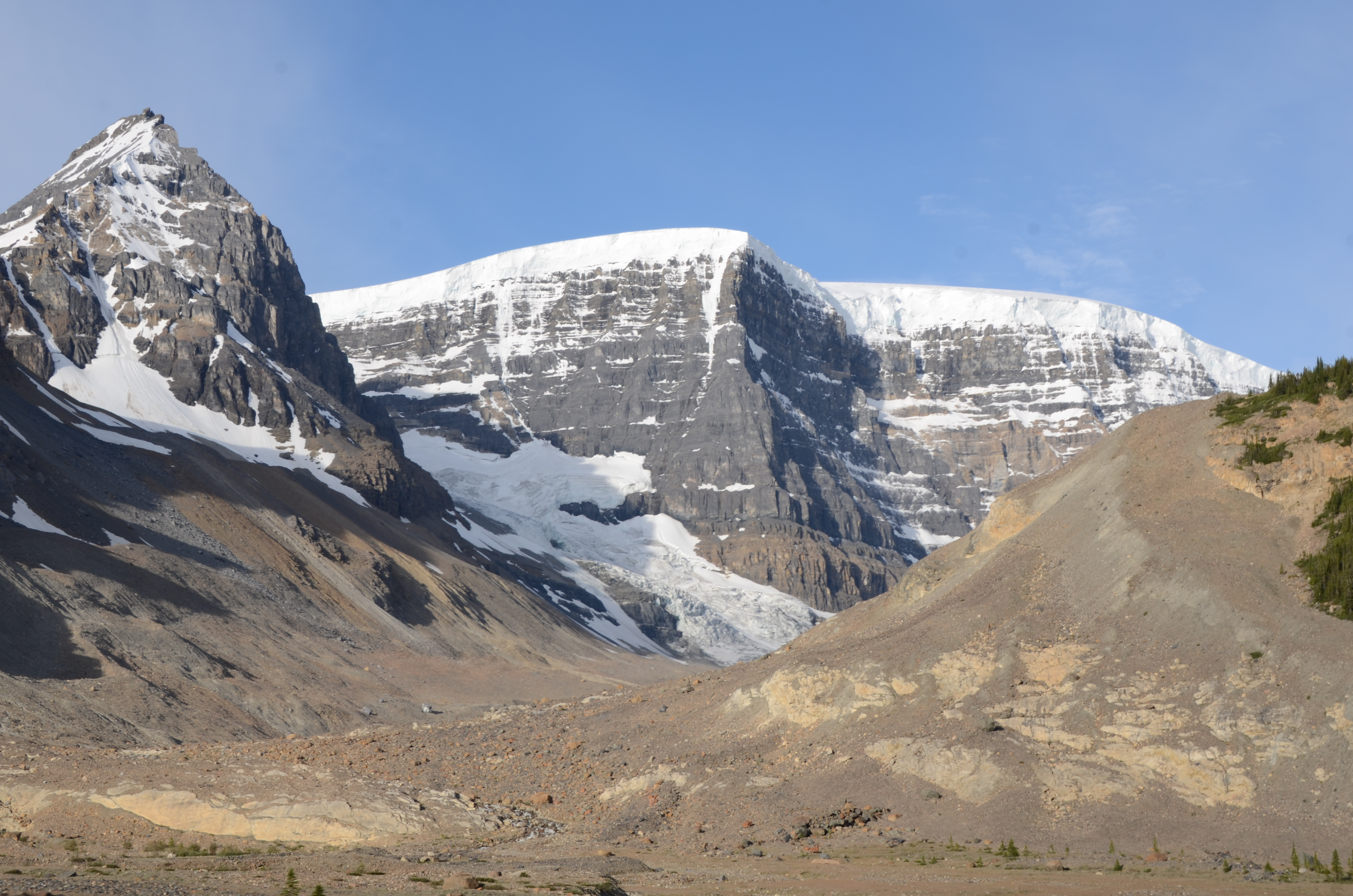
Snow Dome seen from Icefields Parkway

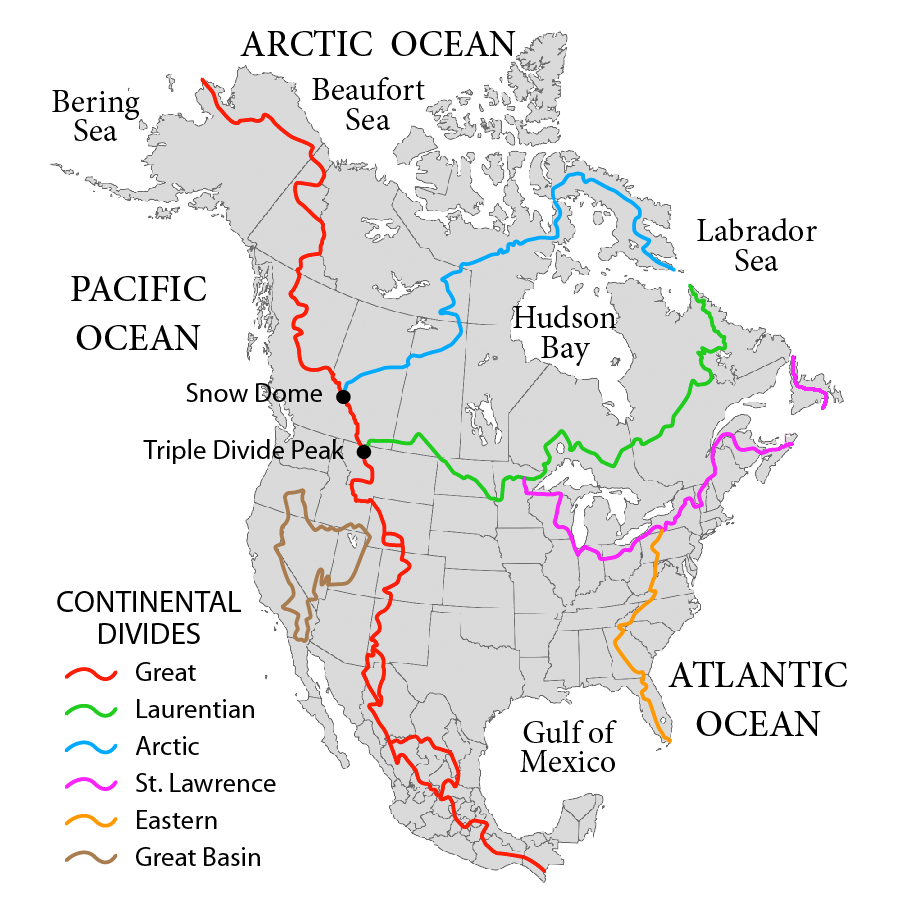
A map of North American drainage basins/divides. Snow Dome is noted at the juncture of the Great (red) and Arctic (blue) divides.
