= Laurentian Divide =

Hydrological divide in North America

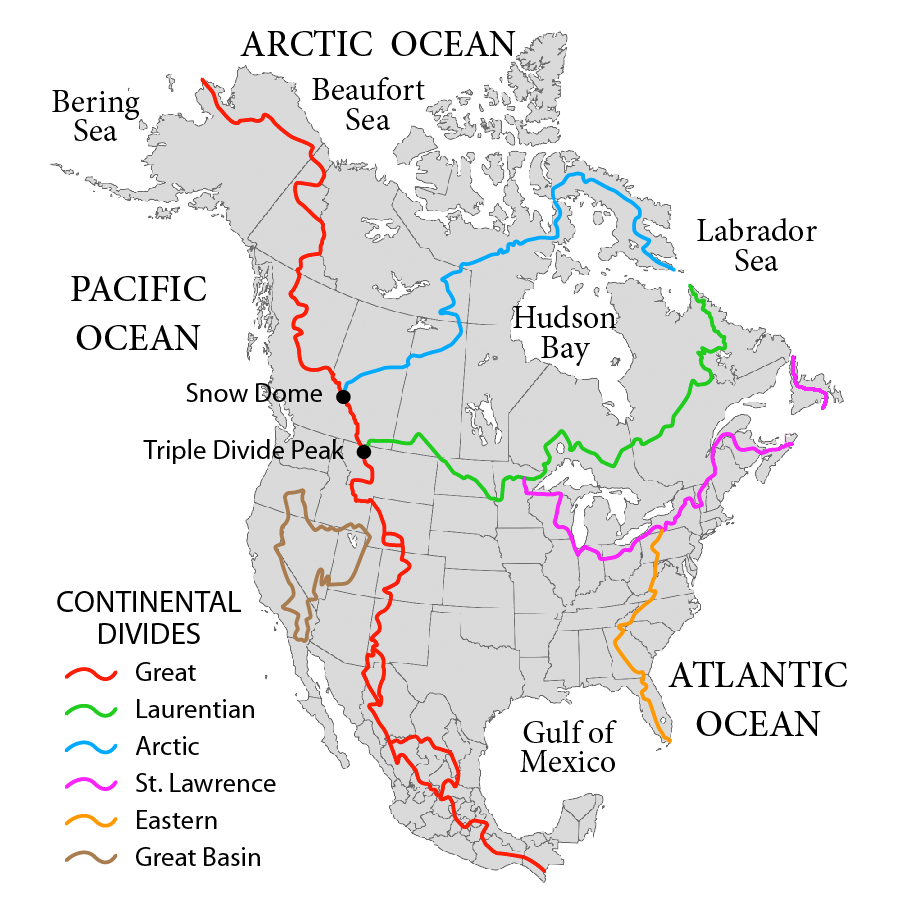
The Laurentian Divide (green) extends from Triple Divide Peak in northwestern Montana to the tip of the Labrador Peninsula at the 60th parallel north.

The Laurentian Divide also called the Northern Divide and locally the height of land, is a continental divide in central North America that separates the Hudson Bay watershed to the north from the Gulf of Mexico watershed to the south and the Great Lakes-St. Lawrence watershed to the southeast.

Water north of the divide flows to Hudson Bay; water south of the divide and also south of the St. Lawrence Divide flows to the Gulf of Mexico, otherwise to the Labrador Sea or via the Great Lakes and St. Lawrence River to the Gulf of St. Lawrence.

== Route ==
=== Montana and Western Canada ===
The Laurentian Divide begins at its junction with the Great Continental Divide at Triple Divide Peak, just south of the Canada–U.S. border in northwestern Montana. In its westernmost section, it divides the watersheds of the South Saskatchewan River to its north from the Missouri River to its south.

It then runs north to just across the border, then east through southern Alberta and Saskatchewan. In this region it splits around several endorheic basins of the Canadian Prairies, including those of Pakowki Lake, Crane Lake, and Old Wives Lake. Just before reentering the United States, the northern watershed switches from the South Saskatchewan River to the Red River of the North, although both are part of the larger Nelson River watershed.

=== Northern United States ===
The divide turns southeasterly, reentering the U.S. near the northwestern corner of North Dakota. It then continues to the extreme northeast corner of South Dakota before crossing the middle of Minnesota's western border at the Traverse Gap. Around this point, the southern watershed switches from the Missouri to the Upper Mississippi River. The divide then runs north and east through northern Minnesota, where the northern watershed switches from the Red to the Rainy River.

It reaches a major triple divide at Hill of Three Waters near Hibbing, Minnesota, which is the junction with the St. Lawrence Seaway Divide. The Laurentian Divide then travels through Superior National Forest in the eastern tip of Minnesota.

=== Ontario ===
The divide then crosses into Ontario where it passes to the north of Lake Nipigon. In this region, the northern watershed switches from the Nelson to the Albany River. Two artificial interbasin transfers in this region have effectively moved the divide northwards around the upper watersheds of the Ogoki River and Kenogami River.

It then runs as far south as the 48th parallel, where the southern watershed switches from Lake Superior to Lake Huron and then the Ottawa River, while the northern watershed is that of the Moose River in this region.

=== Quebec and Labrador ===
The divide veers north again to cross the western border of Quebec just south of Lake Abitibi. It then meanders northeasterly across Quebec. Another interbasin transfer exists at the uppermost portion of the Mégiscane River. Within Quebec, its northern watersheds are those of the Moose, Harricana, and Rupert Rivers, and then of the La Grande River which has been greatly expanded by the James Bay Project. The southern watersheds are those of the Ottawa, Saint-Maurice, Saguenay, Manicouagan, and Moïse Rivers, all of which are tributaries of the St. Lawrence River.

After reaching the southwestern boundary of Labrador, it follows the Labrador–Quebec boundary jaggedly north. The western watersheds of the divide flow first into the La Grande River, and then into several rivers flowing into Ungava Bay, with the George River having the longest boundary. The eastern watersheds of the divide all flow into the Labrador Sea, first via the Smallwood Reservoir system and then through several smaller rivers.

Near its end, it crosses a narrow strait to Killiniq Island, where it briefly becomes the boundary between Nunavut and Labrador before reaching its terminus at Cape Chidley on the Labrador Sea.

== History ==
The eastern portion of the divide marked the original northern boundary of both Ontario and Quebec provinces at the time of Confederation in 1867, although both have since expanded significantly northward. West of Lake Superior, the divide formed the northern boundary of the United States' Louisiana Purchase in 1803.

== Gallery ==
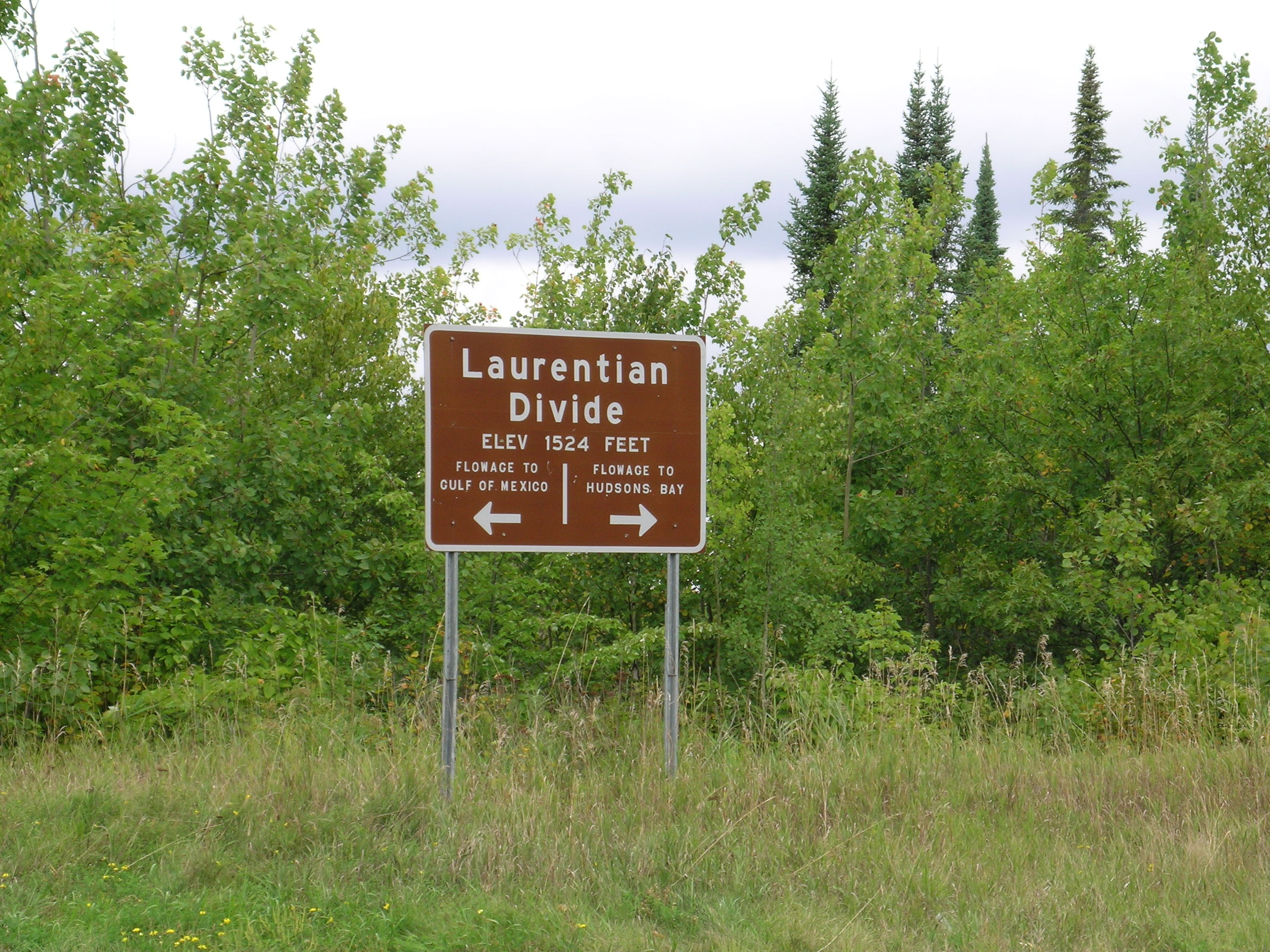
Laurentian Divide along Highway 38 in Minnesota

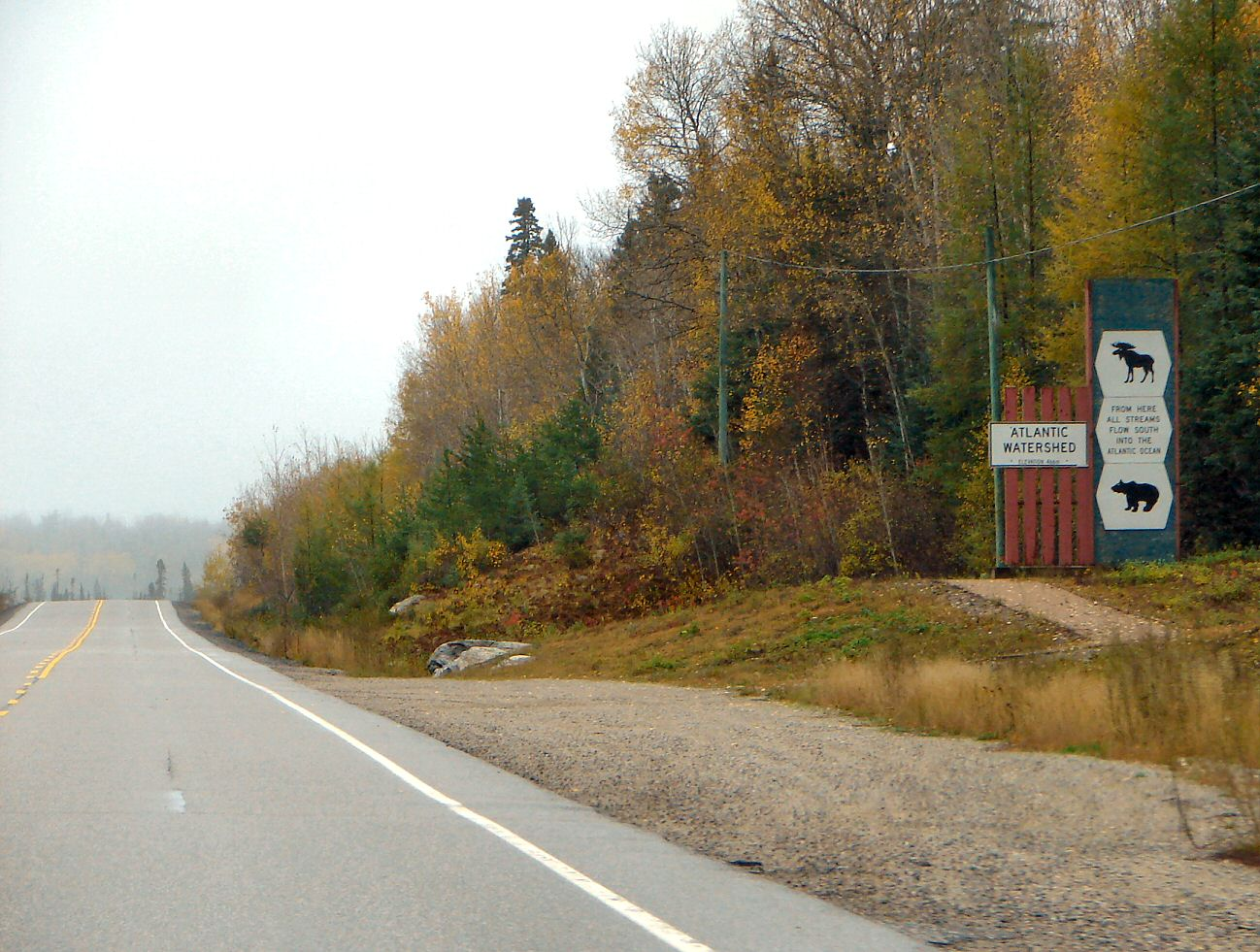
Marker sign for the Divide along Highway 101 in Ontario

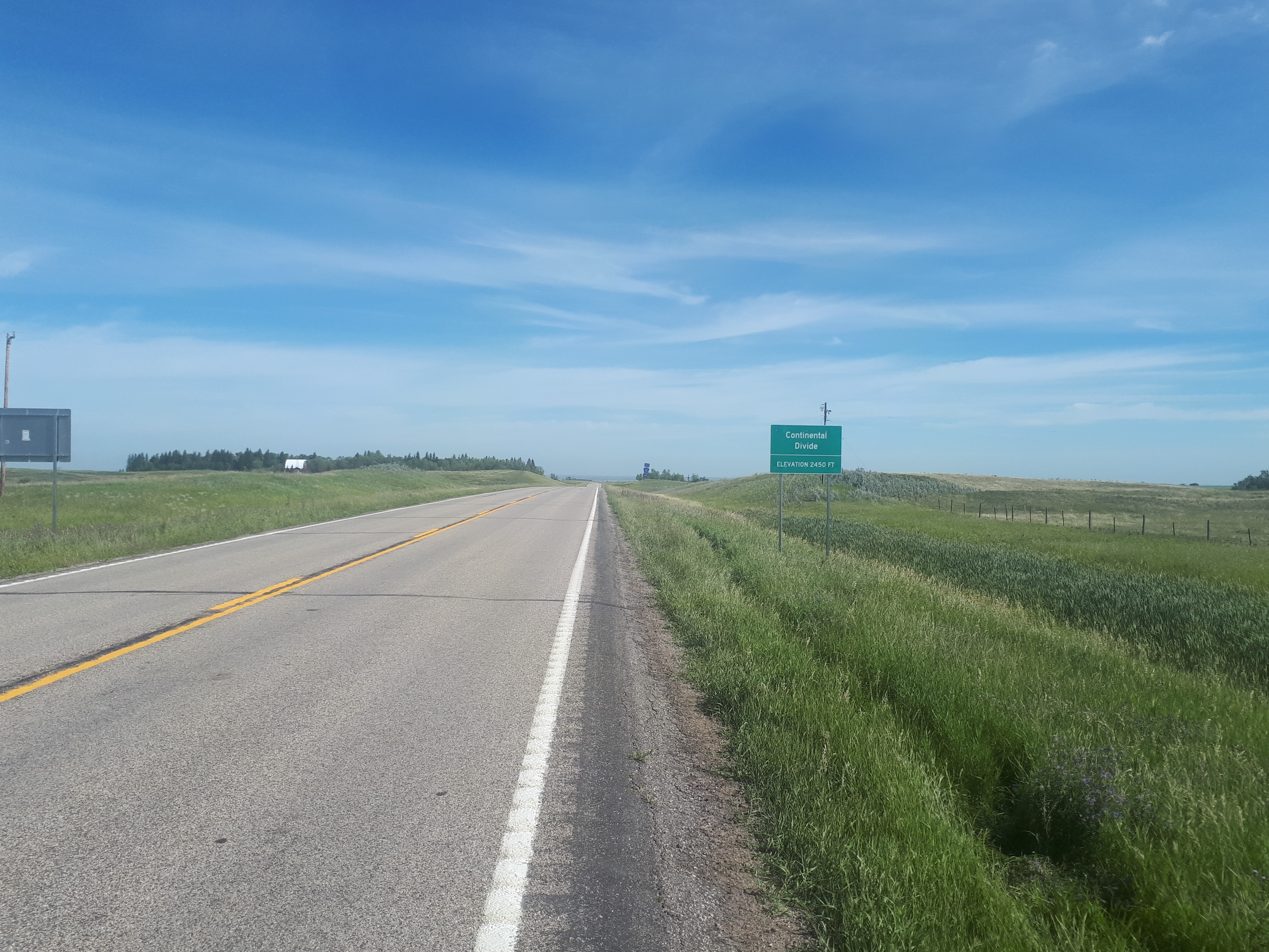
Laurentian Divide along Highway 40 in Burke County, North Dakota

== See also ==
- Canadian Shield or Laurentian Plateau
- Laurentia
- Grenville Orogeny
- Torngat Mountains of the Arctic Cordillera
