= St. Lawrence River Divide =

Hydrological divide in eastern North America

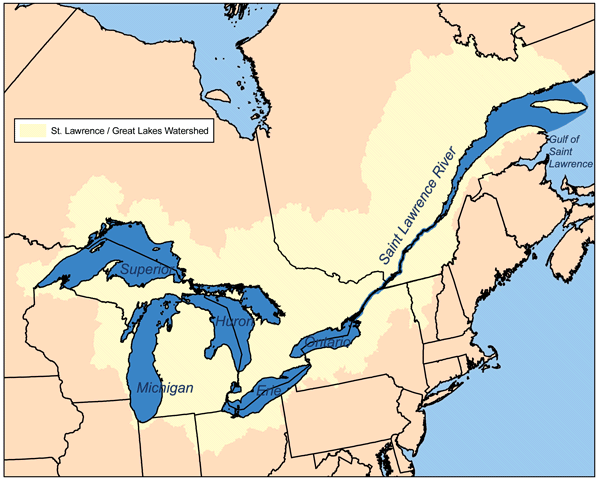
The St. Lawrence River Divide follows the southern boundary of the St. Lawrence River watershed, except for its easternmost portion, which extends into New Brunswick and Nova Scotia.

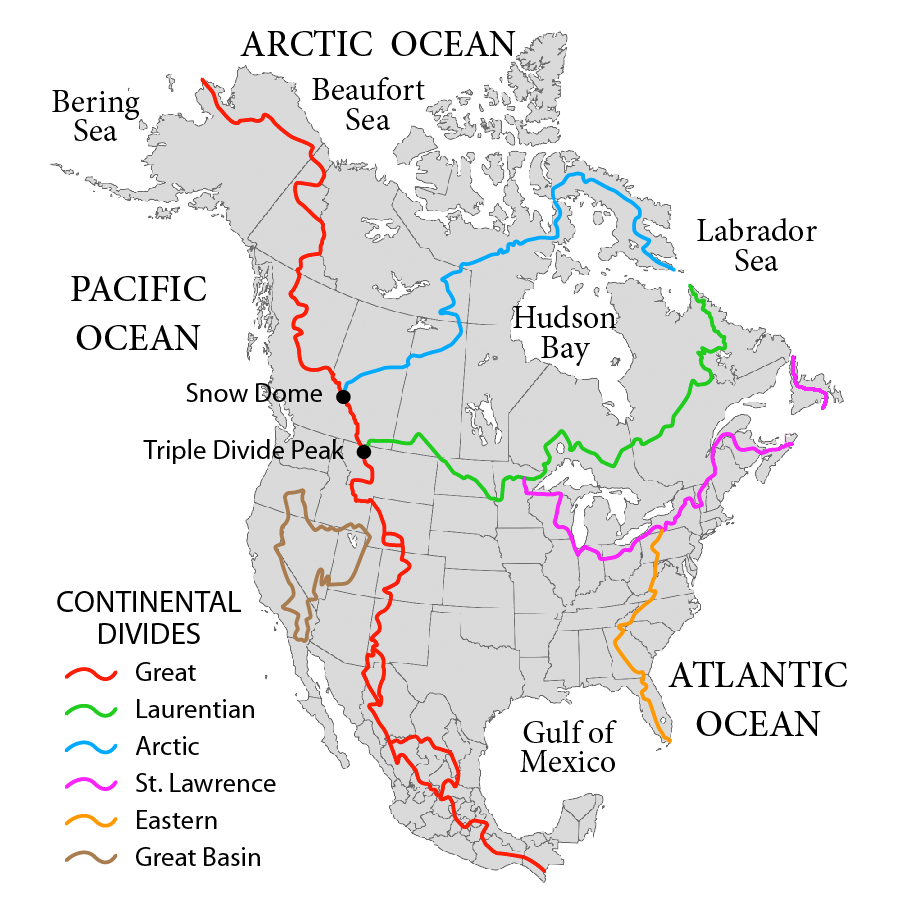
A map of the principal hydrological divides of North America. The St. Lawrence River Divide (magenta line) separates the Great Lakes-St. Lawrence watershed from the southerly watersheds of the Atlantic Ocean.

The Saint Lawrence River Divide or Saint Lawrence Seaway Divide is a continental divide in central and eastern North America that separates the Great Lakes-St. Lawrence River Basin from the southerly Atlantic Ocean watersheds. Water, including rainfall and snowfall, lakes, rivers and streams, north and west of the divide, drains into the Gulf of St. Lawrence or the Labrador Sea; water south and east of the divide drains into the Atlantic Ocean (east of the Eastern Continental Divide, ECD) or Gulf of Mexico (west of the ECD). The divide is one of six continental divides in North America that demarcate several watersheds that flow to different gulfs, seas or oceans.

== Course ==
=== Laurentian triple divide to Chain O' Lakes ===
The divide has its origin at ‘Hill of Three Waters’ triple divide on the Laurentian Divide approx. 2 miles north of Hibbing, Minnesota. It follows the western boundary of the Saint Louis River watershed, and then winds through the Northern Highland of Wisconsin south of the shore of Lake Superior. It then follows the boundary between the Wisconsin River and Fox River watersheds.

In Illinois and Indiana, it follows the Valparaiso Moraine separating the watershed of Lake Michigan to the north from that of the Illinois River to the south. It passes through the heart of the city of Chicago. Between roughly South Bend and Fort Wayne the divide zig-zags among hilly terrain.

Just southeast of Summit Lake near Chain O' Lakes State Park, there is a triple divide between the watersheds of the St. Joseph River into Lake Michigan, the Maumee River into Lake Erie, and the Wabash River which eventually reaches the Gulf of Mexico. This triple divide is significant as it is the westernmost point where water north of the divide cannot be diverted back across the divide through the Chicago Sanitary and Ship Canal.

=== Chain O' Lakes to Eastern triple divide ===
After that it follows the Wabash Moraine in western Ohio, separating the first the watersheds of the Maumee River to the north and Wabash River to the south, and later the Sandusky River to the north from the Scioto River to the south.

The divide then generally parallels the Portage Escarpment near the southern shore of Lake Erie through eastern Ohio, Pennsylvania, and western New York. This portion's northern watersheds include several smaller rivers that drain directly to Lake Erie, the largest of which is the Cuyahoga River; the southern watersheds are the Muskingum River, Beaver River, and Allegheny River.

After passing around Chautauqua Lake, which is in the Allegheny River watershed, the divide turns away from Lake Erie and it crosses into the Allegheny Plateau region. It follows the boundary of Cattaraugus Creek and then the Genesee River basins to the north, while continuing to drain to the Allegheny River to the south. After reentering Pennsylvania, the St. Lawrence River divide meets the triple divide at the northern end of the Eastern Continental Divide.

=== Eastern triple divide to Miller Lake ===
Through central New York, the divide separates the Oswego River watershed, which contains most of the Finger Lakes region, to the north from the Susquehanna River basin to the south. The divide then follows the boundary of the Hudson River watershed to the south through the Adirondacks, dipping briefly south of Lake George and Lake Champlain before following the northern boundary of the Connecticut River watershed.

For its next stretch, the divide follows the boundary of the Saint John River watershed to the south. The divides becomes the international border between Maine and Quebec between the headwaters of Halls Stream and the Southwest Branch Saint John River. The divide then continues into the Notre-Dame Mountains in Quebec.

=== Miller Lake to Cape Canso ===
The St. Lawrence River Divide diverges from the watershed of the St. Lawrence River at a hill above Miller Lake, the source of the Rimouski River, shortly after entering New Brunswick. From this point, water to the north and east of the divide flows directly to the Gulf of St. Lawrence, initially via the Restigouche River.

Eventually, the divide borders the Petitcodiac River basin to its south, crosses through the Isthmus of Chignecto, and runs easterly along the Cobequid Mountains along the northern coast of Nova Scotia and eventually to Cape Canso.

== Hydrology ==
As the divide is generally in close proximity to each of the Great Lakes to the north, the rivers on this side of the divide are generally short. To the southwest, there are broader watersheds that are tributaries of the Upper Mississippi River and the Ohio River that ultimately drain to the Gulf of Mexico. To the southeast are several major river watersheds that drain directly to the Atlantic Ocean.

== Canals ==
Three canals cross the divide: The Champlain Canal connects Lake Champlain to the Hudson River watershed. The Erie Canal connects Lake Erie to the Hudson River watershed. The Chicago Sanitary and Ship Canal crosses the Chicago Portage and connects Lake Michigan to the Mississippi River watershed. Historically there were additional canals, e.g., the Ohio and Erie Canal, but most of these are no longer in operation. The Portage Canal connected the Fox River to the Wisconsin River at Portage, Wisconsin, from 1876 to 1951.

== Locations ==
SLRD points
Area	Point	Summit or other feature
Minnesota: The Hill of Three Waters	1,732 feet (528 m); 47.472366°N 92.964181°W	Triple watershed point: watersheds of the Hudson Bay, Gulf of Mexico, & Gulf of Saint Lawrence. Nearest town: Hibbing, MN
Minnesota: Interstate 35	1,140 feet (350 m); 46.532422°N 92.630497°W	Near Barnum, Minnesota
Illinois: Chicago Portage	589 feet (180 m); 41.837222°N 87.702222°W	Low saddle in the divide, that led to the founding and development of the city of Chicago
Ohio: Interstate 75	1,023 feet (312 m); 40.48426°N 84.16952°W	I-75 passes over the Saint Lawrence River Divide between Pusheta Creek (Great Lakes Basin) and Loramie Creek (Mississippi basin) near mile marker 105 (kilometer 165).
Pennsylvania: Interstate 79	1,345 feet (410 m); 41.93475°N 80.17389°W	
Pennsylvania: Interstate 86	1,488 feet (454 m); 42.138779°N 79.823920°W	Crossing 1 of 5
New York: Interstate 86	1,650 feet (500 m); 42.143894°N 79.672828°W	Crossing 2 of 5
New York: Interstate 86	1,579 feet (481 m); 42.147870°N 79.653323°W	Crossing 3 of 5
New York: New York State Route 16	1,680 feet (510 m); 42.419347°N 78.494526°W	Machias, New York just south of Lime Lake
New York: Interstate 86	1,797 feet (548 m); 42.212286°N 78.208695°W	Crossing 4 of 5
Pennsylvania: Ulysses Township, Potter County	2,523 feet (769 m); 41°50′48″N 77°50′14″W	triple watershed point: watersheds of the Atlantic Seaboard, Gulf of Mexico, & Gulf of Saint Lawrence at the respective headwaters of Pine Creek (West Branch Susquehanna River), the Allegheny River, and the Genesee River.
New York: Interstate 86	2,104 feet (641 m); 42.311058°N 77.863099°W	Crossing 5 of 5
