= Continental Divide of the Americas =

Principal hydrological divide of North and South America

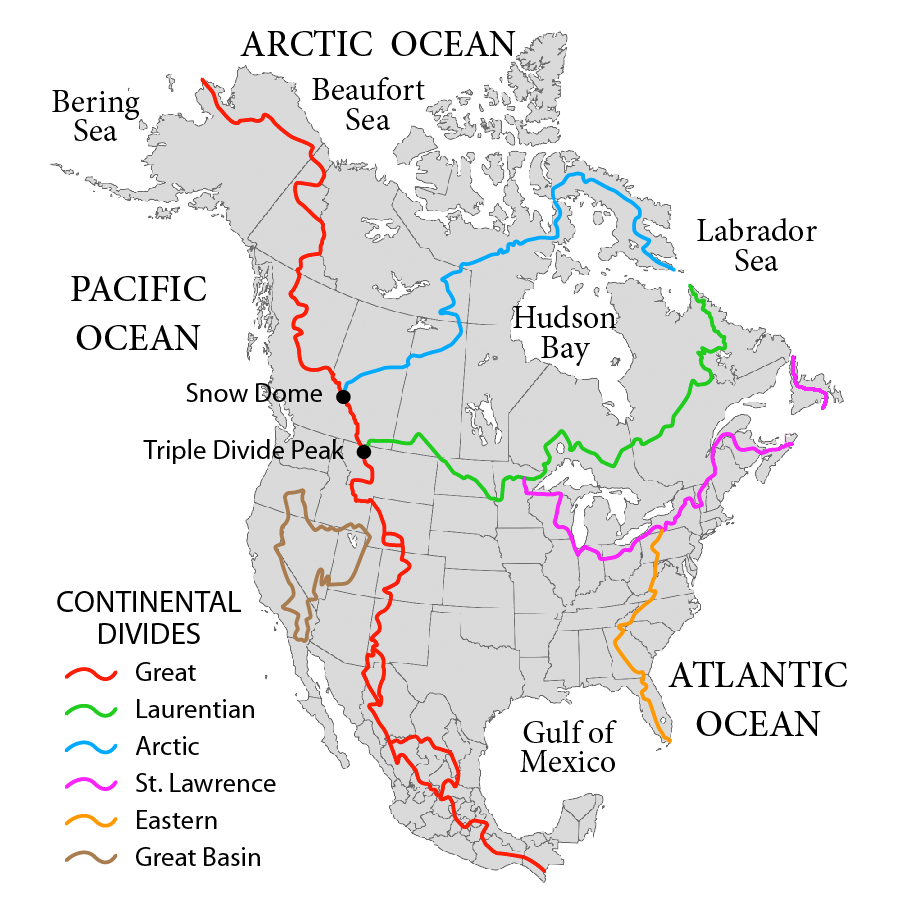
The Continental Divide in North America in red and other drainage divides in North America

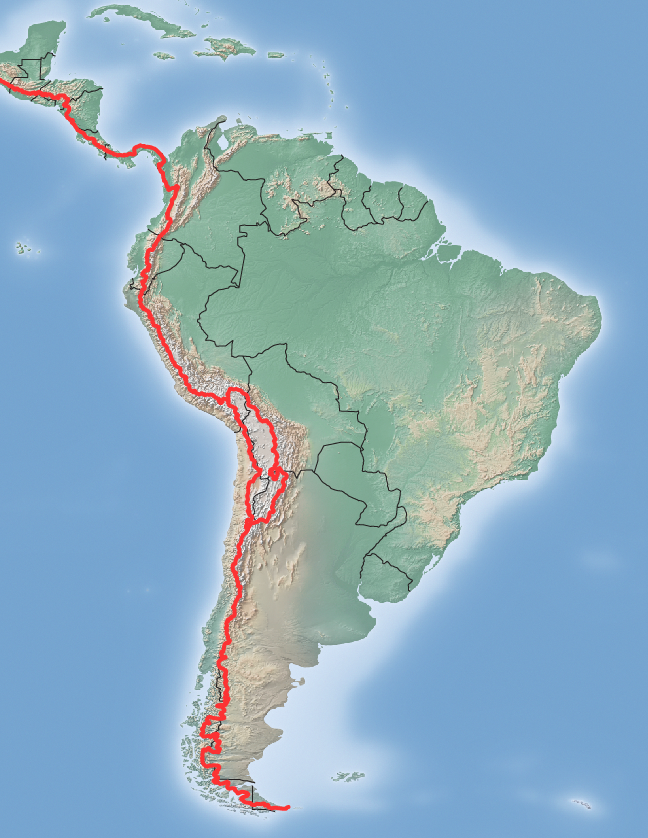
The Continental Divide in Central America and South America

The Continental Divide of the Americas (also known as the Great Divide, the Western Divide or simply the Continental Divide; Spanish: Divisoria continental de América, Gran Divisoria) is the principal, and largely mountainous, hydrological divide of the Americas. The Continental Divide extends from the Bering Strait to the Strait of Magellan, and separates the watersheds that drain into the Pacific Ocean from those river systems that drain into the Atlantic and Arctic Ocean, including those that drain into the Gulf of Mexico, the Caribbean Sea, and Hudson Bay.

Although there are many other hydrological divides in the Americas, the Continental Divide is by far the most prominent of these because it tends to follow a line of high peaks along the main ranges of the Rocky Mountains and Andes, at a generally much higher elevation than the other hydrological divisions.

== Geography ==
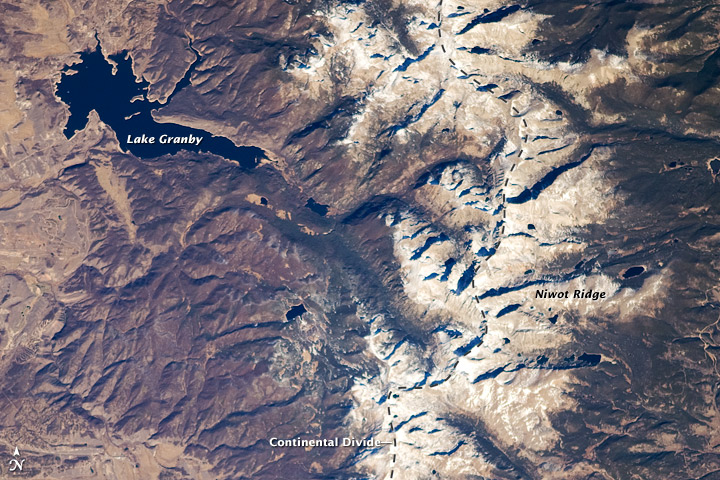
The Continental Divide in the Front Range of the Rocky Mountains of north central Colorado, taken from the International Space Station in October 2008.

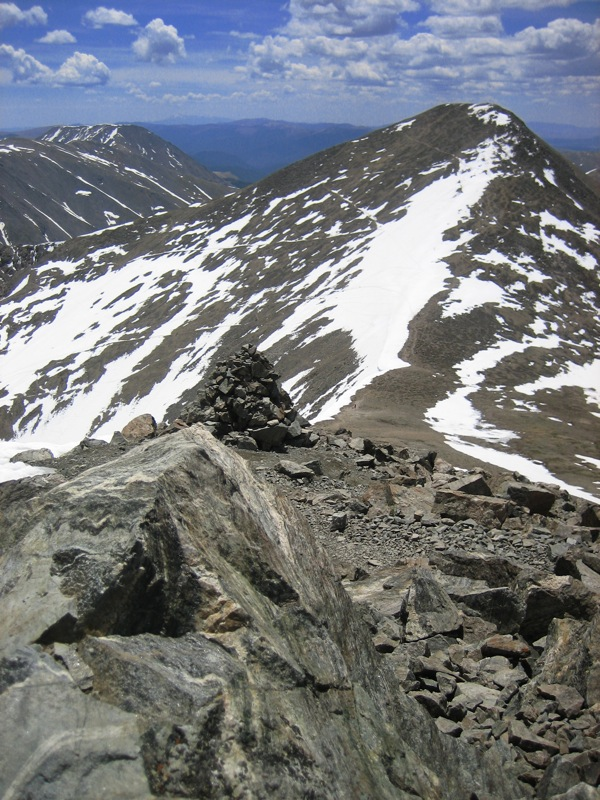
Grays Peak, at 4,352 m (14,278 ft), is the highest point of the Continental Divide in North America.

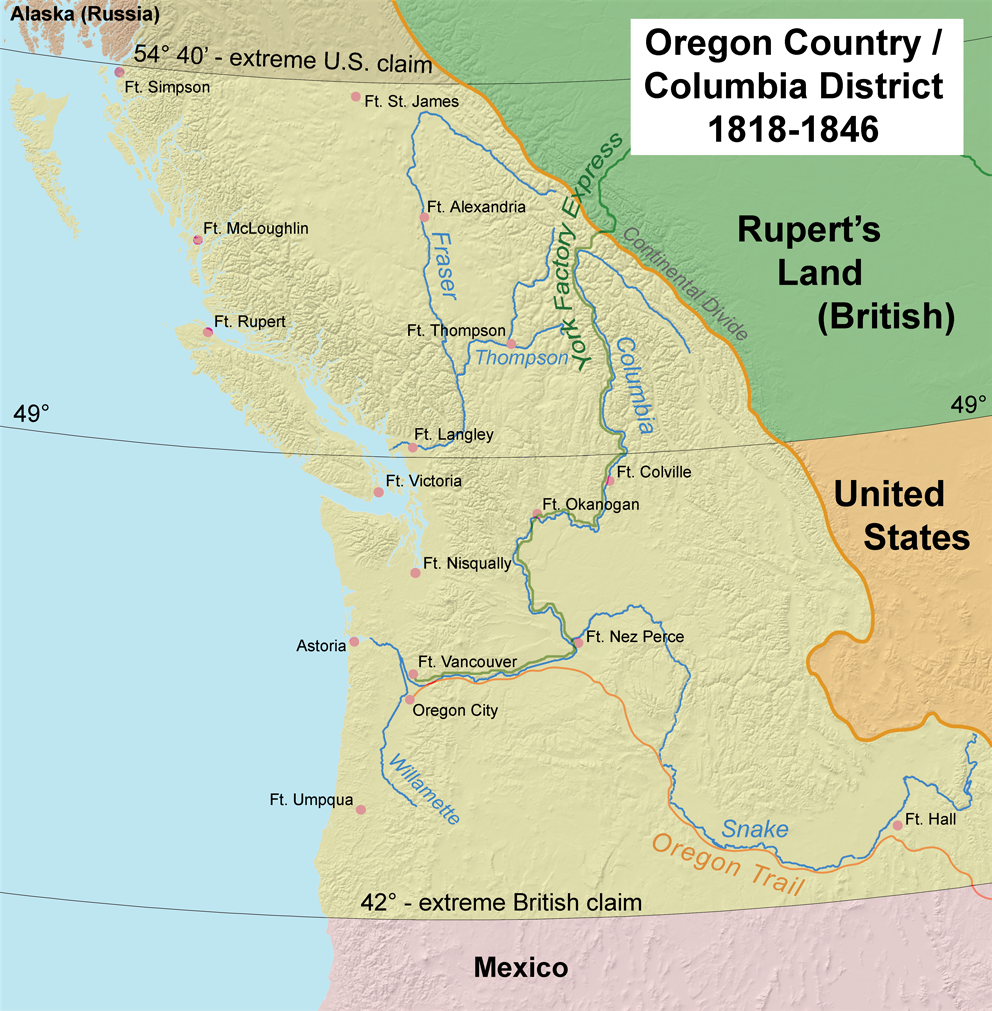
The Treaty of 1818 used the Continental Divide as the eastern boundary of the Oregon Country, which was a United Kingdom-United States condominium until the Oregon Treaty of 1846 divided the area between Britain and the United States.

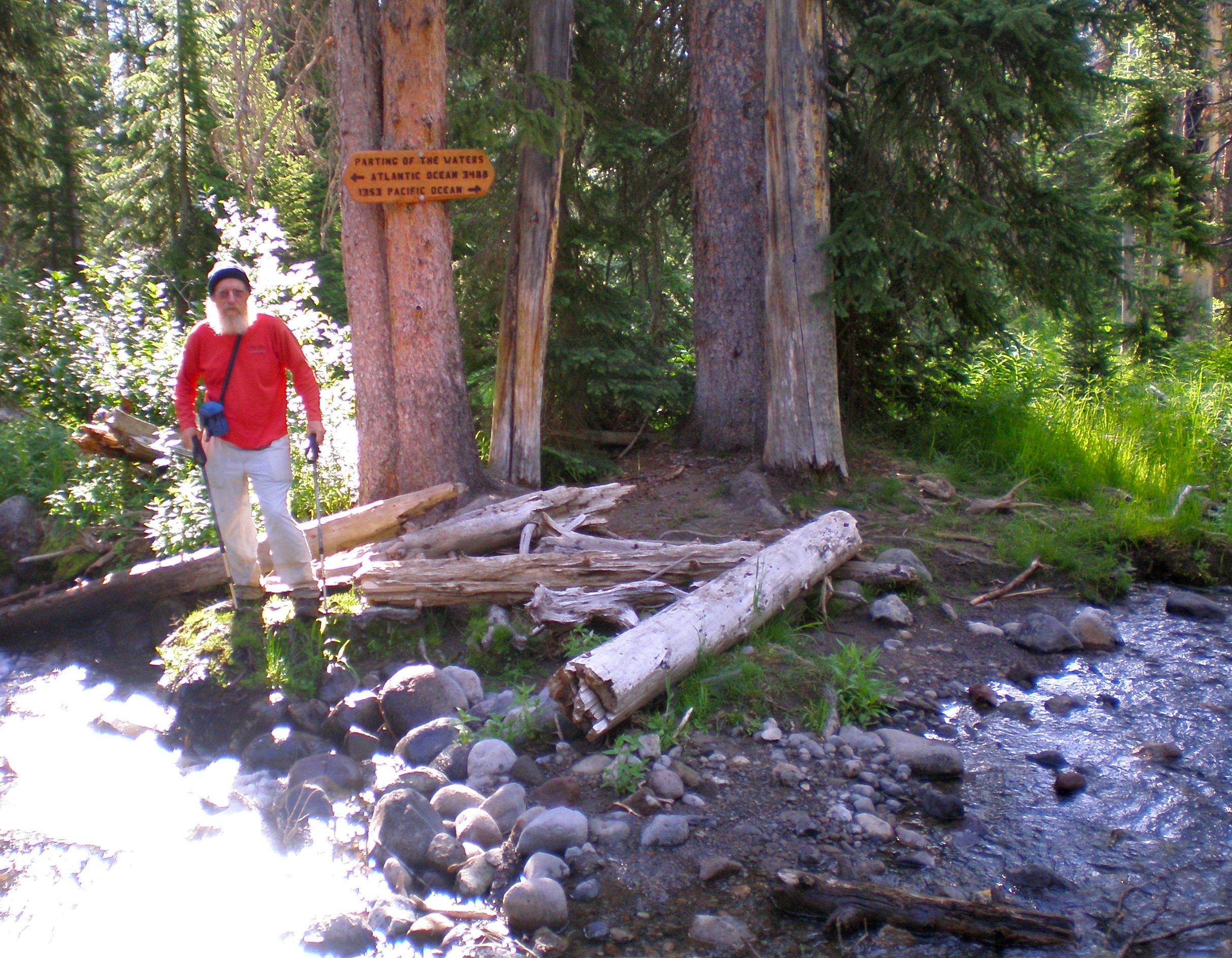
The Parting of the Waters in the Teton Wilderness, where one fork flows into the Pacific Ocean and the other flows into the Atlantic Ocean

Beginning at the westernmost point of the Americas, Cape Prince of Wales, just south of the Arctic Circle, the Continental Divide's geographic path runs through Arctic Alaska, where it reaches its more northerly point close to the U.S.–Canada border near the Beaufort Sea. The Divide zig-zags southwardly over Yukon, and forms part of the boundary between Yukon and the Northwest Territories in the Mackenzie Mountains. It then proceeds through the Northern British Columbia Interior via the Cassiar Mountains, Omineca Mountains and northern Nechako Plateau to Summit Lake, north of the city of Prince George and just south of the community of McLeod Lake. From there the Divide traverses the McGregor Plateau to the spine of the Rockies, following the crest of the Canadian Rockies southeast to the 120th meridian west, from there forming the boundary between southern British Columbia and southern Alberta.

The Divide crosses into the United States in northwestern Montana, at the boundary between Waterton Lakes National Park and Glacier National Park. In Canada, it forms the western boundary of Waterton Lakes National Park, and in the US bisects Glacier National Park. Further south, the Divide forms the backbone of the Rocky Mountain Front (Front Range) in the Bob Marshall Wilderness, heads south towards Helena and Butte, then west past the namesake community of Divide, Montana, through the Anaconda-Pintler Wilderness to the Bitterroot Range, where it forms the eastern third of the state boundary between Idaho and Montana. The Divide crosses into Wyoming within Yellowstone National Park and continues southeast around the Great Divide Basin, through the Sierra Madre Range into Colorado where it reaches its highest point in North America at the summit of Grays Peak at 4,352 metres (14,278 ft). It crosses US Hwy 160 in southwestern Colorado at Wolf Creek Pass, where a line symbolizes the division. The Divide then proceeds south into western New Mexico, passing along the western boundary of the endorheic Plains of San Agustin. Although the Divide represents the height of land between watersheds, it does not always follow the highest ranges/peaks within each state or province.

In Mexico, it passes through Chihuahua, Durango, Zacatecas, Aguascalientes, Jalisco, Guanajuato, Querétaro, México, the Federal District, Morelos, Puebla, Oaxaca, and Chiapas. In Central America, it continues through southern Guatemala, southwestern Honduras, western Nicaragua, western/southwestern Costa Rica, and southern Panama. The divide reaches its lowest natural point in Central America at the Isthmus of Rivas at 47 metres (154 ft) in Nicaragua. In Panama, the Canal cuts through it at 26 metres (85 ft).

The Divide continues into South America, where it follows the peaks of the Andes Mountains, traversing western Colombia, central Ecuador, western and southwestern Peru, and eastern Chile (essentially conforming to the Chile-Bolivia and Chile-Argentina boundaries), southward to Cabo San Diego at the southern end of Patagonia and Tierra del Fuego. The Divide passes through the Punta Cancanan Pass in Peru at 4,700 metres (15,420 ft).

=== Additional divides ===
The Arctic Divide or Northern Divide in northern and western Canada separates the Arctic Ocean watershed from the Hudson Bay watershed. Another, mainly non-mountainous, divide, the Laurentian Divide (also sometimes called the Northern Divide), further separates the Hudson Bay-Arctic Ocean drainage region from the Atlantic watershed region. Secondary divides separate the watersheds that flow into the Great Lakes and Saint Lawrence River (ultimately into the Atlantic) from watersheds that flow to the Gulf of Mexico (also part of the Atlantic Ocean) via the Missouri-Mississippi-Ohio river system. Another secondary divide follows the Appalachian chain, which separates those streams and rivers that flow directly into the Atlantic Ocean from those that exit via the Ohio and Mississippi Rivers.

=== Triple points ===
Triple Divide Peak in Glacier National Park, Montana, is the point where two of the principal continental divides in North America converge, the primary Continental Divide and the Northern or Laurentian Divide. From this point, waters flow to the Pacific Ocean, the Atlantic Ocean via the Gulf of Mexico, and the Arctic Ocean via Hudson Bay. Most geographers, geologists, meteorologists, and oceanographers consider this point the hydrological apex of North America, as Hudson Bay is generally considered part of the Arctic Ocean. For example, the International Hydrographic Organization (in its current unapproved working edition only of Limits of Oceans and Seas) defines the Hudson Bay, with its outlet extending from 62.5 to 66.5 degrees north (just a few miles south of the Arctic Circle) as being part of the Arctic Ocean, specifically "Arctic Ocean Subdivision 9.11."

This hydrological apex of North America status of Triple Divide Peak is the main reason behind the designation of Waterton-Glacier International Peace Park as the "Crown of the Continent" of North America. The summit of the peak is the world's only oceanic triple divide point. Discounting Antarctica and its ice sheets, only one other continent (Asia) borders three oceans, but the inward-draining Endorheic basin area of Central Asia from western China to the Aral and Caspian Seas is so vast that any Arctic and Indian Ocean tributaries are never within proximity of each other. Thus, North America's status of having a single location draining into three oceans is unique in the world.

Sources differ, however, on whether Hudson Bay, entirely south of the Arctic Circle, is part of the Atlantic or Arctic Ocean. Hudson Bay's water budget connects to the Atlantic more than to the Arctic Ocean. The channels to the north of Hudson Bay are largely cut off by Baffin Island from the Arctic, so much of the water that enters it mixes with the Atlantic to the east via Hudson Strait rather than north into the Arctic. The result is that most of the ice flowing down the Saskatchewan Glacier eventually ends up as water in the Atlantic Ocean.

If Hudson Bay is considered part of the Atlantic, then the triple point is at an unimportant-looking, permanently snow and ice covered hump on the border between Alberta and British Columbia, on the southern slope of Snow Dome at 3,456 metres (11,300 ft). The exact location of this potential triple point is somewhat indeterminate because the Columbia Icefield and the snow on top of it shifts from year to year. The snow that falls on it (about 10 metres (33 ft) per year) does not actually flow downhill as water, but creeps downhill in the form of glacial ice. That ice flows down the Athabasca Glacier to the Arctic Ocean via the Athabasca and Mackenzie rivers. Ice flowing west goes to the Pacific Ocean via Bryce Creek and the Bush and Columbia Rivers. Ice flowing down the Saskatchewan Glacier goes via the North Saskatchewan, Saskatchewan, and Nelson rivers into Hudson Bay.

While Triple Divide Peak (or, alternatively, Snow Dome) is the world's only oceanic triple divide, there are secondary triple divide points wherever any two continental divides meet. North America has five major drainage systems: into the Pacific, Atlantic and Arctic oceans, plus Hudson Bay and the Gulf of Mexico. Other sources such as the International Hydrographic Organization add a sixth: Canada's Northwest Passage basin. Using just the five, there are four secondary continental divides and three secondary triple points, the two mentioned previously and a third near Hibbing, Minnesota, where the Northern Divide intersects the Saint Lawrence Seaway divide. Since there is no true consensus on what a continental divide is, there is no real agreement on where the secondary triple points are located. However, the main Continental Divide described in this article is a far more distinctive geological feature than the others and its two main triple points are much more prominent.

=== Hiking trail ===
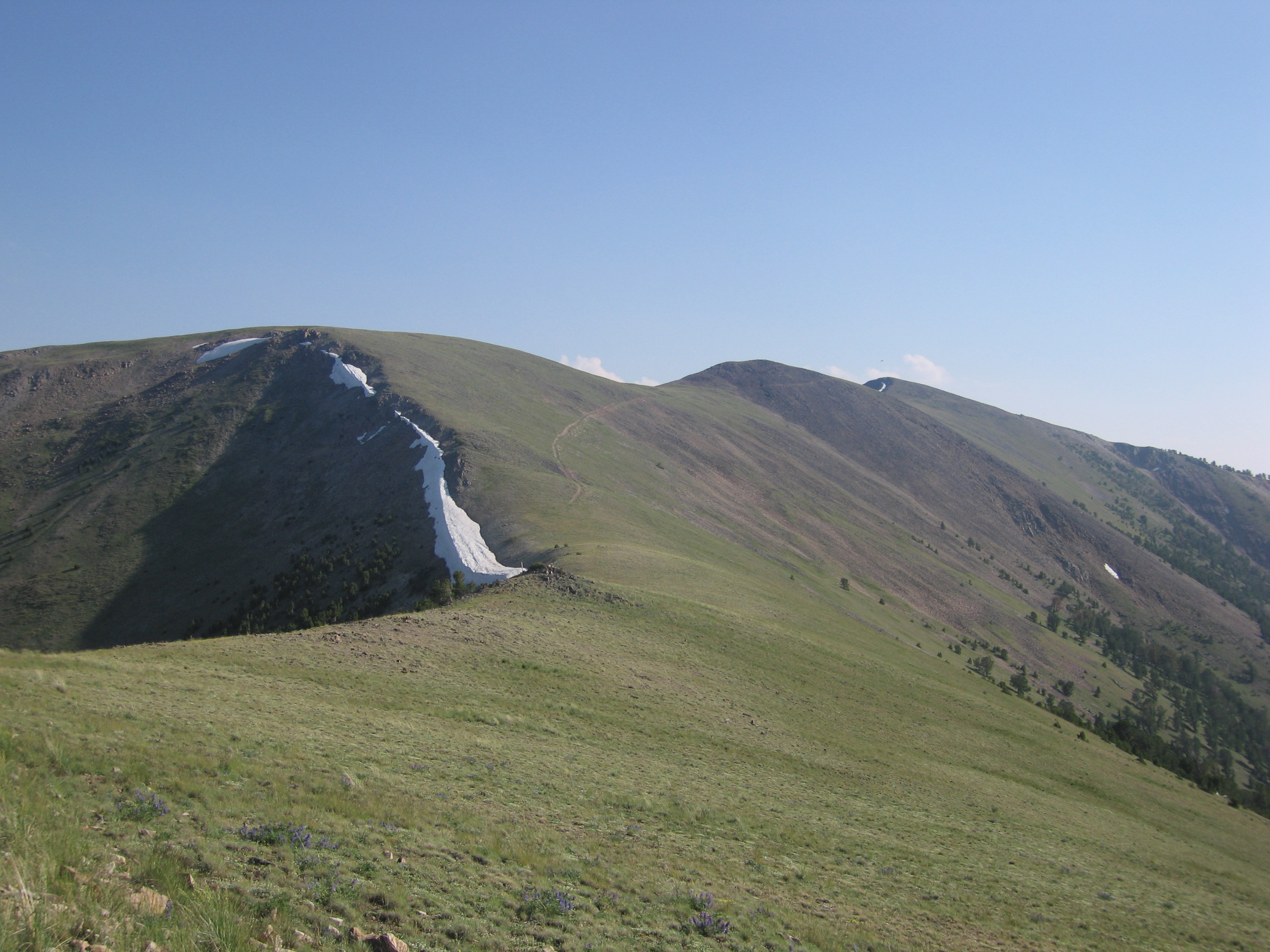
The Continental Divide Trail often remains above the treeline and on the Divide, providing unobstructed views along its route.

The Continental Divide National Scenic Trail (CDT) follows the Divide through the U.S. from the Mexico–US border to the Canada–US border. The trail itself is a corridor of pathways; that is, dedicated footpaths or back roads, either on or near the Continental Divide. A less-developed Canadian extension called the Great Divide Trail continues through five national parks and six provincial parks, ending at Kakwa Lake in east-central British Columbia.

== Exceptions ==
Many endorheic regions in North and South America complicate the simple view of east or west, "ocean-bound" water flow. Several endorheic basins straddle or adjoin the Continental Divide, notably the Great Divide Basin in Wyoming, the Plains of San Agustin and the Animas Valley in New Mexico, the Guzmán Basin in New Mexico and Chihuahua, Mexico, and both the Bolsón de Mapimí and the Llanos el Salado in Mexico. Such basins can be, and routinely are, assigned to one side of the Divide or the other by their lowest perimeter pass; in other words, an assignment is made by determining how the drainage would occur if the basin were to be progressively filled with water until it overflowed.

Large-scale maps, such as those on this page, often show double divide lines when endorheic basins are involved. However, the detailed USGS topographic maps of the United States generally show only the main Divide as determined by the overflow rule. Among other things, this eliminates the need to trace out the boundary for a basin that is very shallow and has a nebulous rim, such as the San Luis Closed Basin in Colorado and the basin of the lost streams of Idaho.

Another rare exception occurs when a stream near a divide splits and flows in both directions, or a lake straddling the divide overflows in both directions. Examples of these are, respectively, North Two Ocean Creek and Isa Lake, both located on the Continental Divide in Wyoming. The Panama Canal has this same feature, but is man-made. Both the Chagres and Gatun rivers flow into Gatun Lake, which empties to both oceans.

Several small lakes along the Divide in the Rocky Mountains between Alberta and British Columbia flow into both provinces and thus into both the Arctic and Pacific Oceans. An example is the "Committee's Punch Bowl", a small lake located in the Athabasca Pass. (Note: It was named by George Simpson, governor of the Hudson's Bay Company, while touring his vast Canadian fur-trading empire in 1825. According to historical sources, "The small circular basin of water at the summit, twenty yards in diameter, is dignified with the name of the 'Committee's Punch Bowl' in honour of which the Governor treated them (his fur traders) to a bottle of wine as they had 'neither time nor convenience to make a bowl of punch, although a glass of it would have been acceptable.'" The reference is to the governing committee of the Hudson's Bay Company in London, England.)

The Alpine Club of Canada's Abbot Pass Hut sat directly astride the Divide in Abbot Pass on the boundary between Banff National Park and Yoho National Park, and thus precipitation falling on the eastern half of the roof flowed via Lake Louise into Hudson Bay, while rain falling on the western half flowed via Lake O'Hara into the Pacific Ocean. The hut was demolished in 2022.

== See also ==
=== Continental divides ===
- Continental divide
  - Eastern Continental Divide
  - Great Basin Divide
  - Laurentian Divide (Northern Divide)
  - Saint Lawrence River Divide
- Triple divide

=== Other related ===
- American Cordillera
- Continental Divide Trail
- Cromwell Dixon
- Great Divide Mountain Bike Route
- Great Divide Trail
- Laurentia
- Lewis and Clark
- List of railroad crossings of the North American continental divide
