= Bioceanic principle =

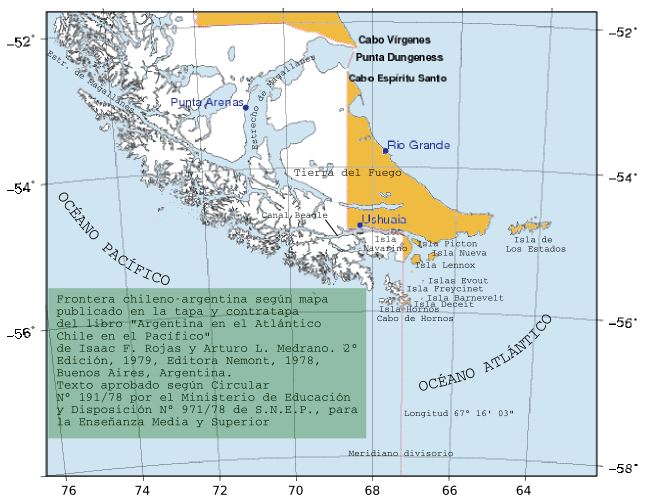
Southern border between Argentina and Chile according to the Argentine interpretation of the bioceanic principle

The bioceanic principle (in Spanish: principio bioceánico), also called the Atlantic-Pacific principle (in Spanish: principio Atlántico-Pacífico), is a criterion or doctrine of territorial division that Argentina tried to apply as a principle of international law within its limits with Chile, of which Chile strictly rejected its existence.

The difference between the two countries was the subject of diplomatic disagreements during most of the second half of the 20th century. The arbitral tribunal that ruled on the Beagle conflict in 1977, after a study of the arguments presented by both countries between 1971 and 1977, when the criterion was formally developed by Argentina, issued a judgment that declared such principle non-existent. Argentina declared the arbitration ruling of the judges null and void and planned a military operation at the end of the decade. Chile accepted the arbitration award and transformed it into the law of the Republic.

Argentina understood that its essential form was made explicit on May 1, 1893, in the additional and clarifying protocol of the 1881 treaty, postulating that in its American territories Chile cannot claim any point towards the Atlantic Ocean, while Argentina cannot claim it towards the Pacific Ocean.

This Argentinian interpretation has never been applied in determining the border and has never been recognized internationally. Currently the Treaty of Peace and Friendship between Argentina and Chile leaves the islands Picton, Nueva, Lennox, Terhalten, Bernavelt, Hornos, Deceit and other with eastern coasts under Chilean sovereignty. This treaty has been in force since 1984 and recognized by both countries.
