= Savage Mountain =

Anticline extending from Bedford County, Pennsylvania southwest into Western Maryland

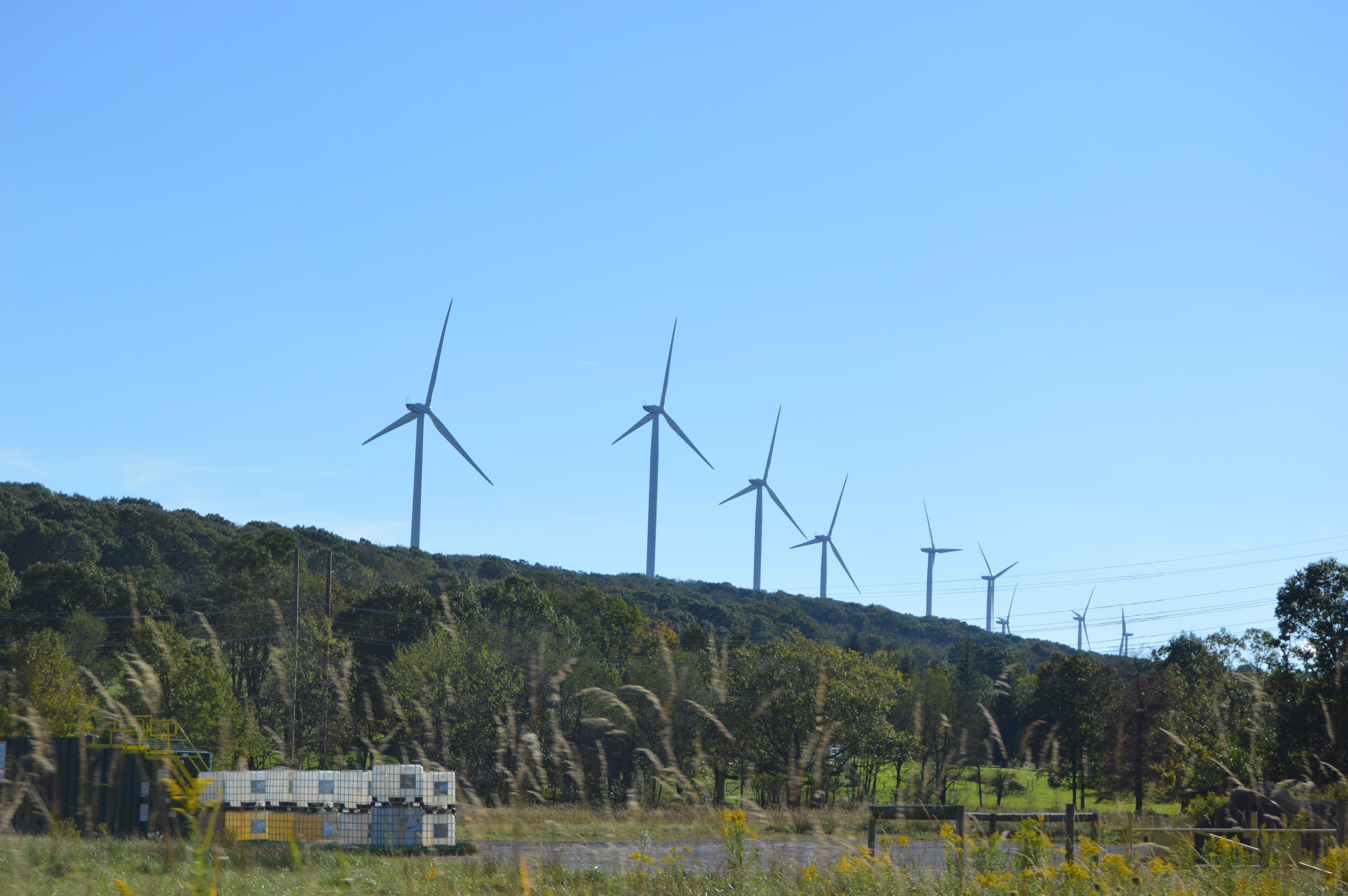
- Wind farm on the summit, near Pleasant Union, Pennsylvania

Highest point
- Elevation: 2,667 ft (813 m)

Dimensions
- Length: 30 mi (48 km)

Naming
- Etymology: eponym: John Savage

Geography
- Location within Pennsylvania
- Country: United States
- States: Maryland and Pennsylvania
- Counties: Allegany MD, Bedford PA, Garrett MD and Somerset PA
- Range coordinates: 39°53′11″N 78°44′10″W
- Parent range: Ridge-and-Valley Appalachians

Geology
- Orogenies: Alleghenian orogeny (the western edge of the Allegheny Formation "shows along the eastern slope of Savage Mountain".)
- Mountain type: anticline
- Rock type: Carboniferous: "Mauch Chunk Red; Shales and Limestones"

Savage Mountain is an anticline extending from Bedford County, Pennsylvania, southwest into Western Maryland. It is the western side of the Ridge-and-Valley Appalachians, and the eastern portion of the ridge forms the border of Garrett and Allegany Counties of Maryland.

The anti-cline includes two parallel component ridges: Little Savage Mountain to the west and Big Savage Mountain to the east. Little Savage Mountain becomes Allegheny Mountain to the north at a saddle near Meyersdale, while Big Savage Mountain becomes Backbone Mountain to the south at the Savage River Reservoir.

Portions of Savage Mountain form the Eastern Continental Divide, separating watersheds draining to the Ohio River and those draining to the Potomac. To the northwest of Savage Mountain, waters drain to the Casselman River. The North Branch Potomac River watershed encompasses the southwestern and eastern portions of the ridge.

== History ==
After Nemacolin's Path and the first survey of the Potomac (1736–1737) had passed through the area, the Braddock Road over the ridge opened in 1757. By 1767, the Mason–Dixon line survey had placed milestones across the ridge and the National Road was completed through the area by 1818.

1866 depiction of the "Savage Mountains"' triple ridge between the Negro and Wills Mountains

In 1911, construction began on the Borden and Big Savage Tunnels for the Connellsville subdivision of the Western Maryland Railway. In the 1930s, the Civilian Conservation Corps built a connection road that is now the 6.4 mile Monroe Run Trail.

The Savage River Dam and Reservoir were constructed just southwest of the ridge in 1952 to control flooding along the Savage River and North Branch Potomac River, as well as to supply water to nearby communities.

On August 13, 1976, the freeway that would become Interstate 68 opened through the ridge. Due to severe fog conditions common along this stretch of highway, Maryland's first "fog warning system" was installed after a May 2003 crash that killed two and injured about 100 people.

In 2001, the fire history and dendroecology of Savage Mountain oak stands were investigated. About 2,600 trees were later planted in the Savage Mountain Demonstration Plot #2 in 2007.

== Wind power ==
In 2006, U.S. WindForce proposed a 40-megawatt (54,000 hp)wind farm on Savage Mountain at a strip-mining site. A study for the Savage Mountain Transmission Main Project began in 2008.

== Notable points ==
Point	Location	Elevation
CSX Transportation railroad	39°48′30″N 78°57′27″W	2,430 feet (741 m)
Big Savage Mountain	39°47′40″N 78°49′47″W	2,566 feet (782 m)
Big Savage Tunnel	39°44′27″N 78°53′37″W	2,400 feet (732 m) (above tunnel)
Little Savage Mountain	39°43′49″N 78°55′11″W	2,820 feet (860 m)
Maryland/Pennsylvania state line (Mason–Dixon line)	39°43′21″N 78°54′51″W	2,840 feet (866 m)
U.S. Route 40 Alternate	39°40′56″N 78°58′01″W	2,847 feet (868 m)
Interstate 68/U.S. Route 40	39°40′23″N 78°57′46″W	2,830 feet (863 m)
Elbow Mountain	39°34′06″N 79°05′10″W	2,740 feet (835 m)

== See also ==
- Eastern Continental Divide
- Georges Creek Valley
- K2 (sometimes called "the Savage Mountain")
