= Ohiopyle High Bridge =

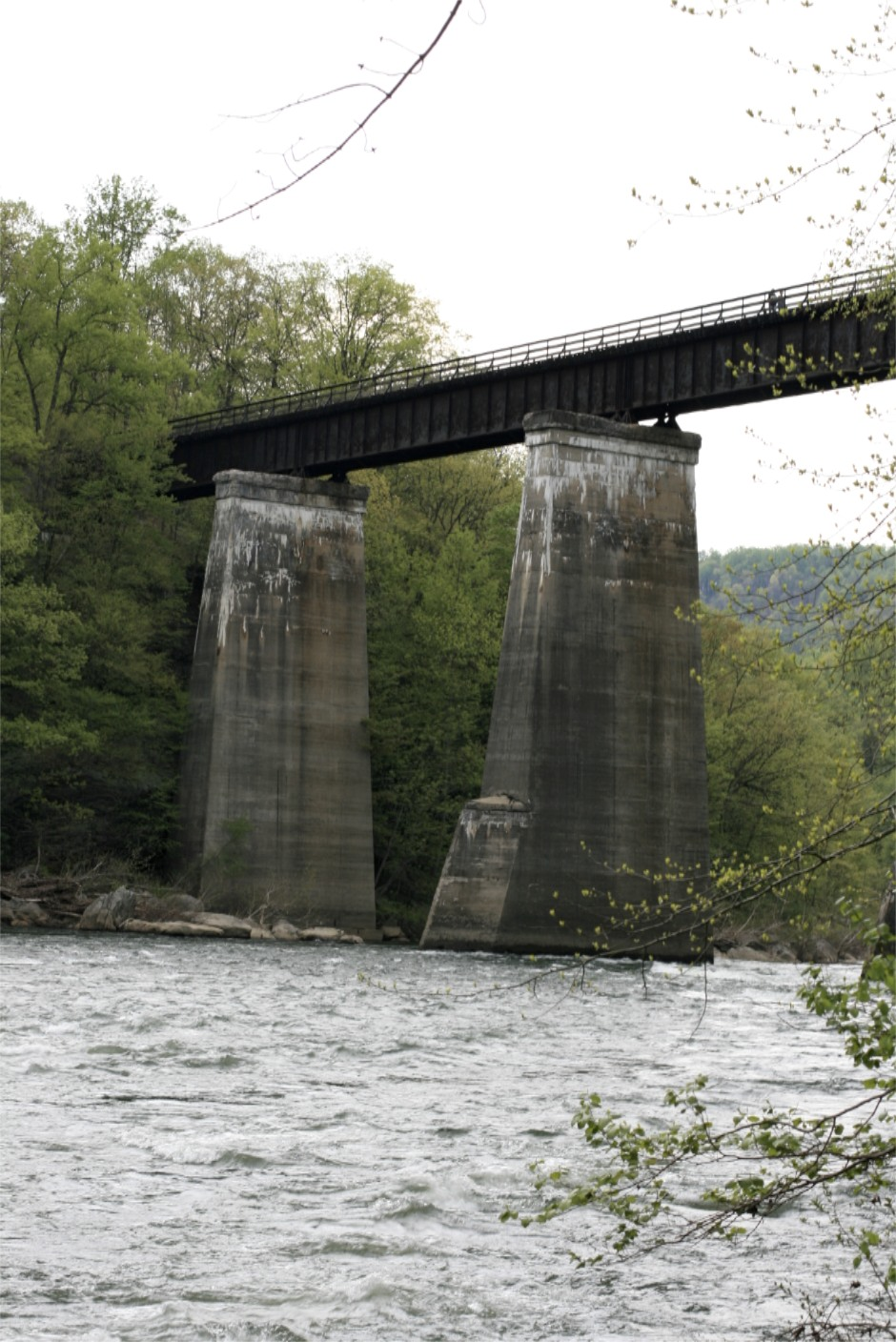
- Ohiopyle High Bridge in 2011
- Coordinates: 39°53′N 79°29′W
- Carries: Great Allegheny Passage trail
- Crosses: Youghiogheny River
- Locale: Ohiopyle, Pennsylvania

Characteristics
- Design: girder bridge
- Total length: 663 feet (202 m)

History
- Opened: 1912

Location
- Interactive map of Ohiopyle High Bridge

The Ohiopyle High Bridge is a structure that carries the Great Allegheny Passage trail across the Youghiogheny River slightly north of Ohiopyle, Pennsylvania, United States.

The span was originally opened in 1912 as part of the last major railroad constructed in Pennsylvania. It served the Western Maryland Railway's expansion from Cumberland, Maryland, to Connellsville, Pennsylvania, and was one of two bridges to cross a meandering section of the river in Ohiopyle. The High Bridge rises over 100 feet higher than the nearby Ohiopyle Low Bridge, which sits upstream from the area's famous waterfall.

By the 1960s, the importance of the High Bridge was dramatically reduced. In 1975, the Western Maryland eliminated all service west of Hancock, Maryland.

The bridge was rehabilitated and reopened for public use in 1989, and became part of the Great Allegheny Passage rail trail.
