= Ohiopyle Low Bridge =

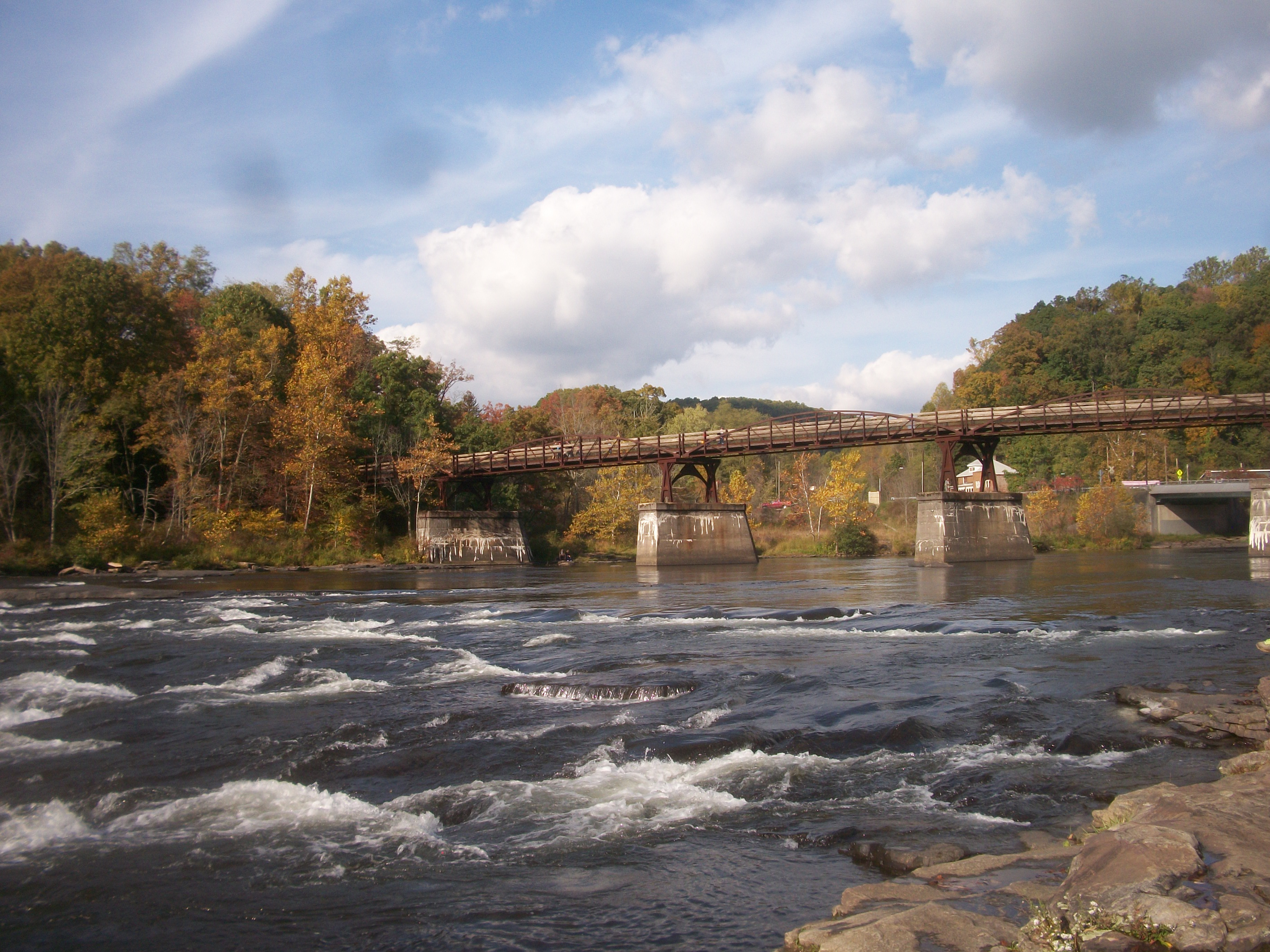
- Coordinates: 39°52′N 79°29′W
- Carries: Great Allegheny Passage trail
- Crosses: Youghiogheny River
- Locale: Ohiopyle, Pennsylvania

Characteristics
- Design: bowstring truss bridge
- Total length: 620 feet (190 m)

History
- Opened: 1912, 1999

Location
- Interactive map of Ohiopyle Low Bridge

The Ohiopyle Low Bridge is a structure that carries the Great Allegheny Passage trail across the Youghiogheny River in Ohiopyle, Pennsylvania, United States.

== History and architectural features ==
The span was originally opened in 1912 as part of the last major railroad built in Pennsylvania. It served the Western Maryland Railway's expansion from Cumberland, Maryland, to Connellsville, Pennsylvania, and was one of two bridges to cross a meandering section of the Youghiogheny River in Ohiopyle. The original deck girder bridge was located near the center of the tiny community of Ohiopyle and opened the rugged region to tourism.

By the 1960s, the importance of the Low Bridge had been dramatically reduced. The automobile had replaced the train as the method of transportation to what was now Ohiopyle State Park, and the narrow clearance of Pennsylvania Route 381's passage under the bridge would lead to bottlenecks during the summer tourism season.

The Western Maryland Railway was incorporated into the Chessie System holding company, and traffic was greatly reduced on ancillary lines; in 1975, all service west of Hancock, Maryland, was eliminated.

Following the closure of the line, a portion of the old bridge was removed to allow for better truck access along PA 381, while the remainder of the structure sat vacant until its incorporation into the Great Allegheny Passage. In 1999, a new bowstring truss bridge was opened on the existing piers of its predecessor. The new bridge is the longest of its type in Pennsylvania.

== See also ==
- Ohiopyle High Bridge

== Gallery ==
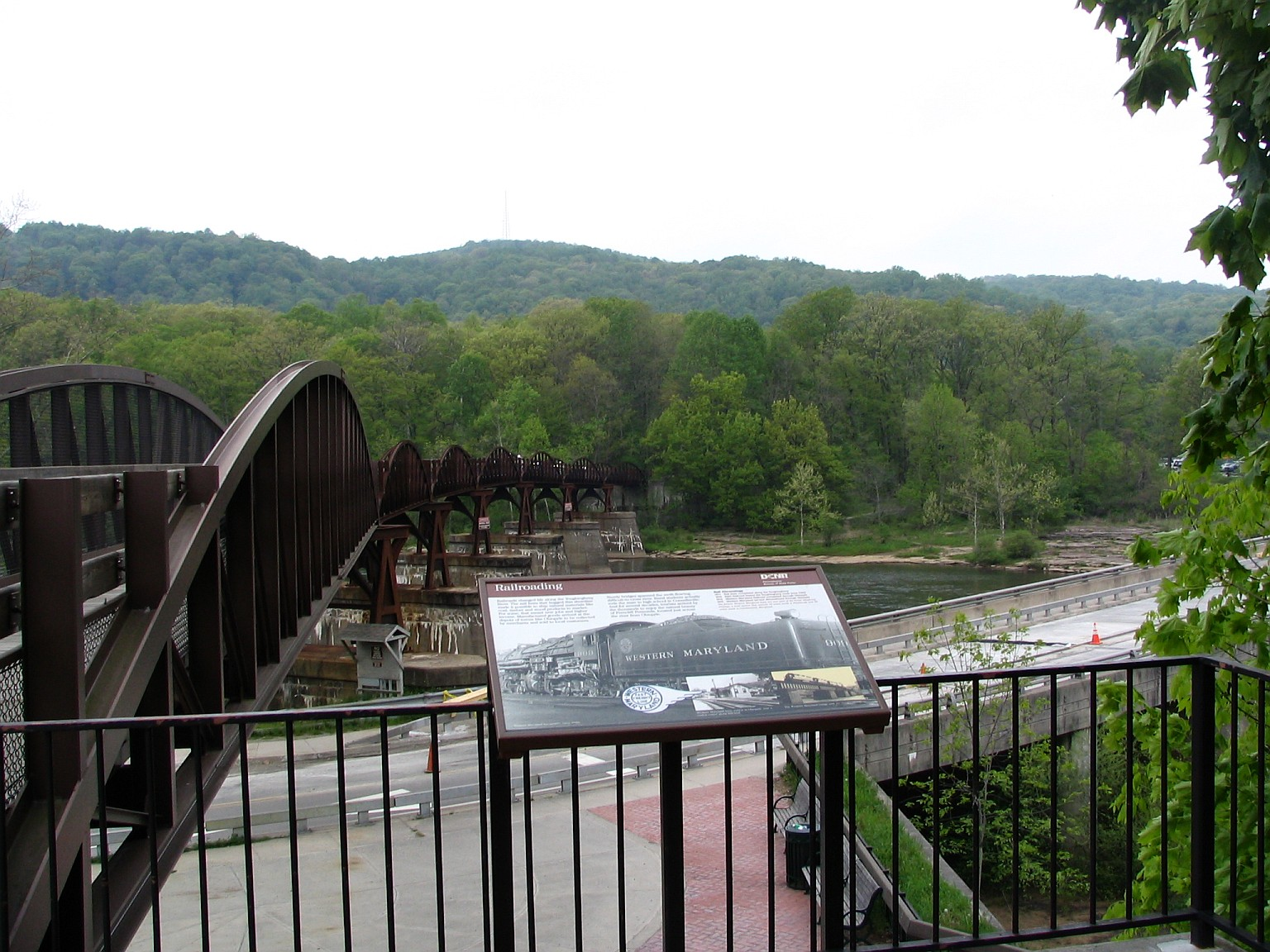
Ohiopyle Low Bridge from the site of the restored railway station
