= Atlantic seaboard watershed =

Watershed of North America

Atlantic Seaboard
- Watershed
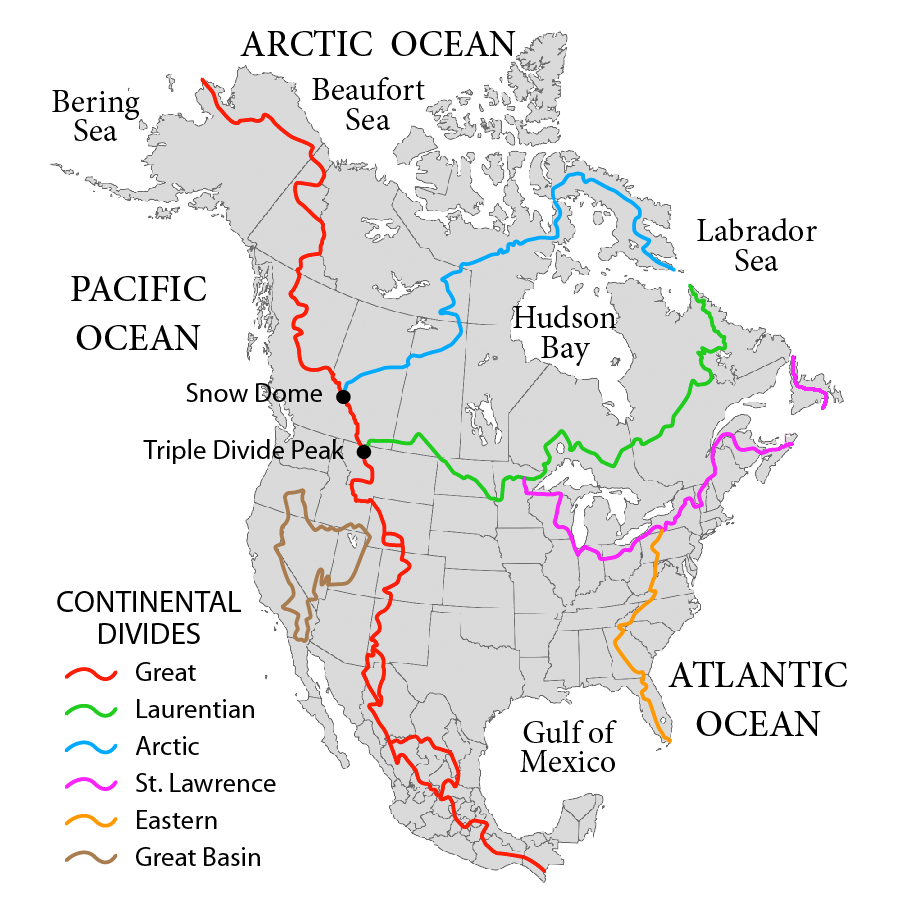
- The Atlantic Seaboard Watershed extends southward along the Atlantic Ocean from Nova Scotia to Florida
- Location: Canada and the United States

Area
  - Total: 720,000 km^{2} (277,000 sq mi)

The Atlantic seaboard watershed is a watershed of the Atlantic Ocean in eastern North America along the Atlantic Canada (Maritimes) coast south of the Gulf of Saint Lawrence Watershed, and the East Coast of the United States north of the Kissimmee River watershed of Lake Okeechobee basin in the central Florida Peninsula.

The continental area east of the Appalachian Mountains and highlands to the north and south is demarcated on the south by drainage to the Lake Okeechobee basin (which drains both westward to the Gulf and eastward to ocean), the Eastern Continental Divide (ECD) to the west, and the Saint Lawrence divide to the north. US physiographic regions of this watershed are the Atlantic Plain and the Appalachian Mountains & Highlands.

Sub-watersheds adjacent to the Saint Lawrence divide

- Chedabucto Bay: 2,148 square miles (5,560 km^{2})
- Gulf of Maine: 69,115 square miles (179,010 km^{2})
- Long Island Sound: 16,246 square miles (42,080 km^{2})
- Lower New York Bay: >14,000 square miles (36,000 km^{2})

Other notable sub-watersheds

- Delaware Bay: 14,119 square miles (36,570 km^{2}) — larger than several, but not adjacent to either divide

Rehoboth Bay
Indian River Bay
Assawoman Bay
Isle of Wight Bay
Sinepuxent Bay
Chincoteague Bay

- Chesapeake Bay: 64,299 square miles (166,530 km^{2}) — adjacent to both divides (at the Triple Divide point)

Sub-watersheds adjacent to the Eastern Continental Divide

- Albemarle Sound: >14,380 square miles (37,200 km^{2})
- Winyah Bay: >7,221 square miles (18,700 km^{2})
- Santee River: >4,531 square miles (11,740 km^{2})
- Savannah River: 9,850 square miles (25,500 km^{2})
- St. Johns River: 8,840 square miles (22,900 km^{2})
- Biscayne Bay: >2,800 square miles (7,300 km^{2})
- Kissimmee River: 3,000 square miles (7,800 km^{2})
