= Eastern Continental Divide =

Hydrological divide in eastern North America

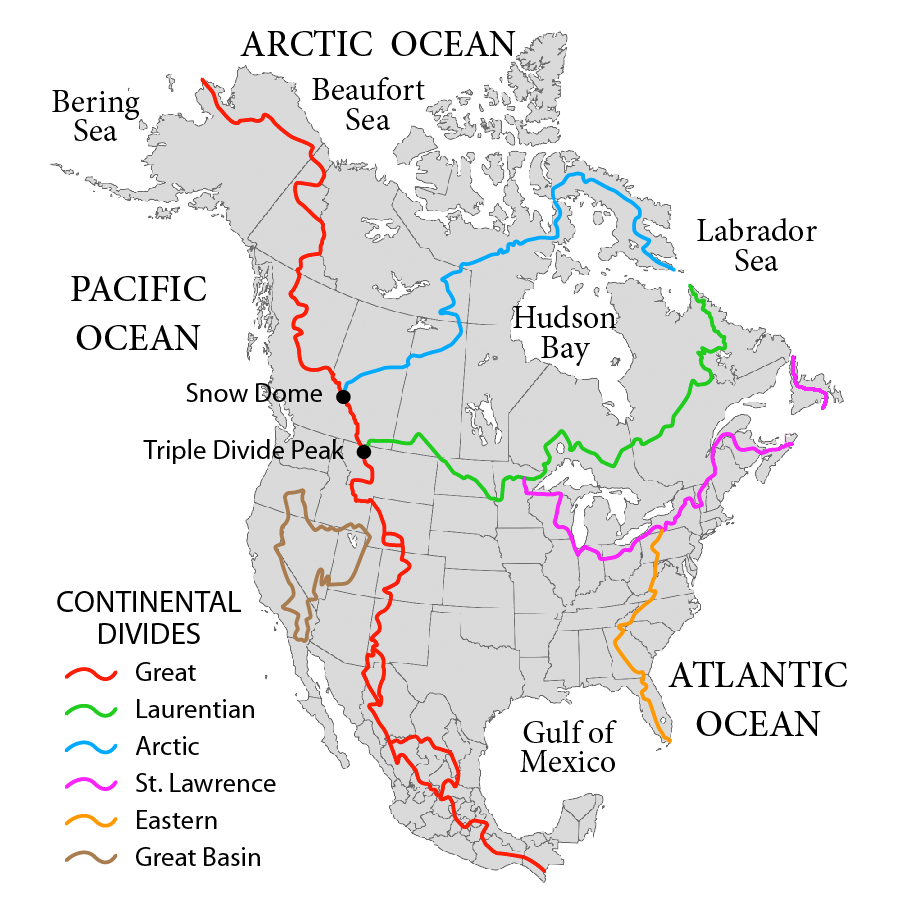
A map of the principal hydrological divides of North America. The Eastern Continental Divide (orange line) demarcates two watersheds of the Atlantic Ocean: the Gulf of Mexico watershed and the Atlantic Seaboard watershed.

The Eastern Continental Divide, Eastern Divide or Appalachian Divide is a hydrological divide in eastern North America that separates the easterly Atlantic Seaboard watershed from the westerly Gulf of Mexico watershed. It is one of six continental hydrological divides of North America which define several drainage basins, each of which drains to a particular body of water.

The divide nearly spans the United States from south of Lake Ontario through the Florida peninsula, and consists of raised terrain including the Appalachian Mountains to the north, the southern Piedmont Plateau and lowland ridges in the Atlantic Coastal Plain to the south.

== Course ==
=== Northern portion ===
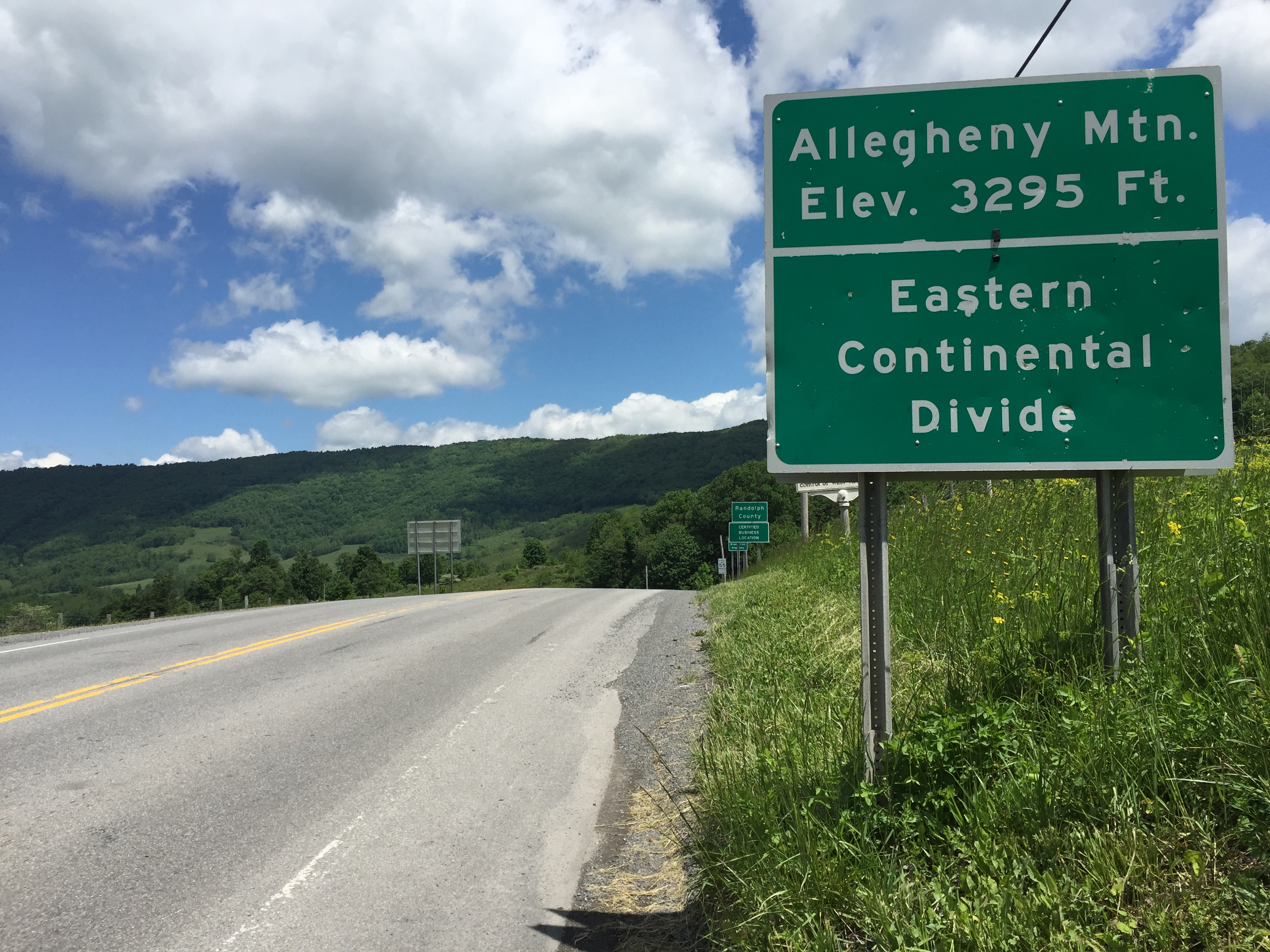
U.S. Route 33/West Virginia Route 55 crosses the Divide in Pendleton County, West Virginia

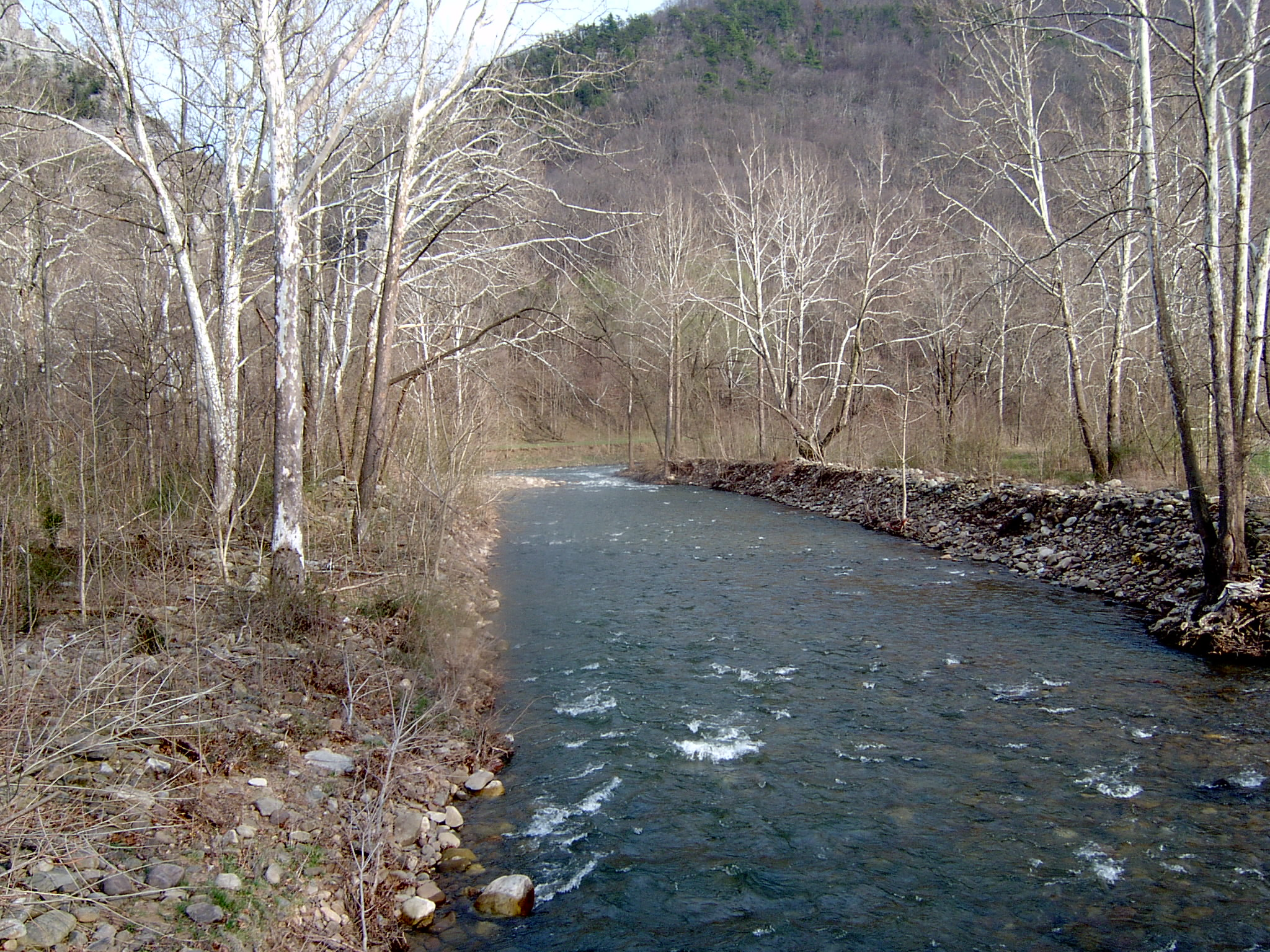
Seneca Creek, incised into the Allegheny Front west of Seneca Rocks, West Virginia. This short but steep creek originates along the Eastern Continental Divide; its waters flow into the Atlantic Ocean via the Potomac River and Chesapeake Bay.

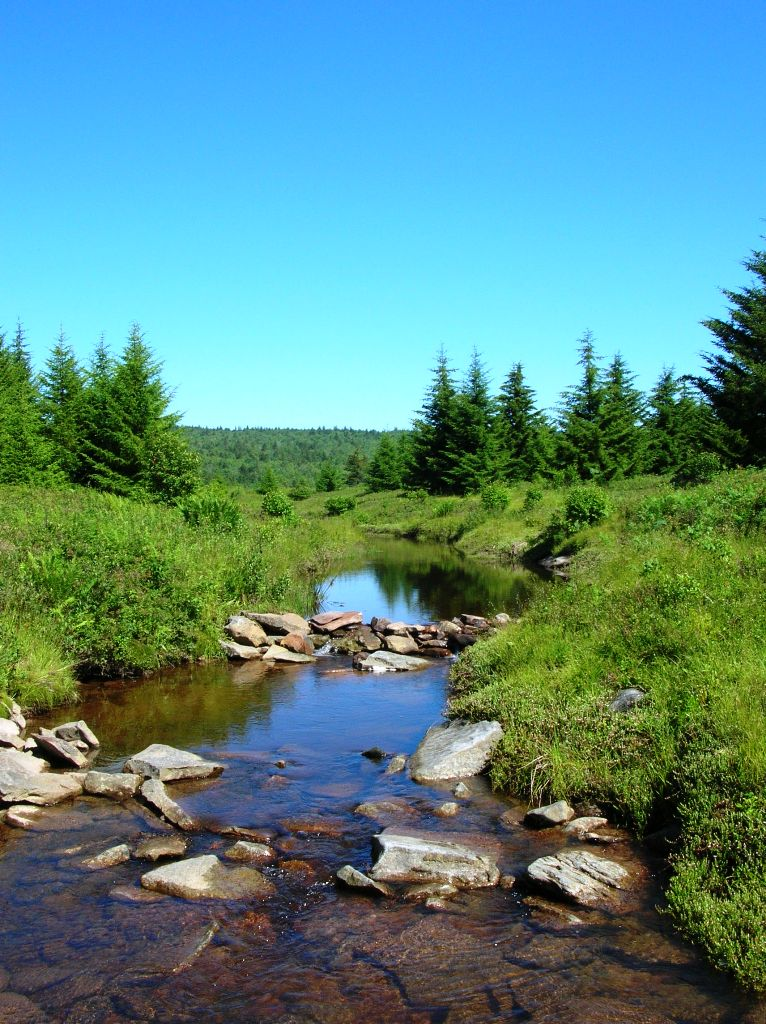
Red Creek west of the crest of the Allegheny Front in the Dolly Sods area of West Virginia; the creek originates along the Eastern Continental Divide, with its waters flowing to the Gulf of Mexico as part of the Ohio River watershed.

The divide's northern portion winds through the middle of the Appalachian Mountains, either through the interior of the Allegheny Plateau or along the Allegheny Mountains. In this portion, the western drainage of the divide flows into the watersheds of the Allegheny River, Monongahela River, and New River, all tributaries of the Ohio River. The eastern drainage flows into the watersheds of the Susquehanna River, Potomac River, and James River, all of which flow into the Chesapeake Bay before entering the Atlantic Ocean.

At its northern terminus, the Eastern Continental Divide originates at Triple Divide Peak (Note: @41°50′48″N 77°50′14″W, elevation: 2,507 feet (764 m)) in Ulysses Township, Pennsylvania, about 10 mi (16 km) south of the New York-Pennsylvania border, where it diverges from the St. Lawrence Divide. This point divides the eastern United States into three watersheds: those of the Genesee River flowing into Lake Ontario and then the St. Lawrence River to the north; Pine Creek into the Susquehanna River as part of the Atlantic seaboard watershed to the east; and the Allegheny River into the Ohio, the Mississippi, and the Gulf of Mexico to the west.

From north to south, the divide passes through the broader Allegheny Plateau region, following the boundary between the Allegheny River and Susquehanna River watersheds through most of Pennsylvania. At Blue Knob near Altoona, the Divide begins to follow Allegheny Mountain and then Little Savage Mountain. A few miles before the state border, the Divide begins to separate the Youghiogheny River and Potomac River watersheds.

In Maryland, the Divide runs significantly west of the Allegheny Front, following Backbone Mountain, and passing near the source of the North Branch Potomac River at the Fairfax Stone. The Divide then passes through a plateau of the Allegheny Mountains of West Virginia, passing between the north end of the Canaan Valley in the Cheat River watershed, and the Mount Storm Lake basin in the Potomac River watershed. The Divide then rejoins the Allegheny Front.

A significant portion of the Divide forms part of the border between West Virginia and Virginia along Allegheny Mountain and then Peters Mountain, separating the Greenbrier River and James River watersheds. It then makes a dramatic arc to the east around the Sinking Creek valley, and then follows the hill crest east of Blacksburg, Virginia.

=== Central portion ===
The divide's central portion generally follows the easternmost ridge of the Blue Ridge Mountains and thus of the Appalachian Mountains as a whole, which takes the form of a high escarpment. In this portion, the western drainage of the divide flows into the watersheds of the New River and Tennessee River, both tributaries of the Ohio River. The eastern drainage flows into the watersheds of the Roanoke River, Pee Dee River, and Santee River.

The divide initially separates the headwaters of the New River from that of the Roanoke River. Just before the Divide passes into North Carolina, it begins to separate the New River and Yadkin River watersheds. It then separates upper tributaries of the Tennessee River from those of the Santee River. Its high point is on Grandfather Mountain at 5,946 feet (1,812 m); although Mount Mitchell is the highest point in the Appalachian Mountains, it is not on the Divide, but 4 miles west of it.

=== Southern portion ===
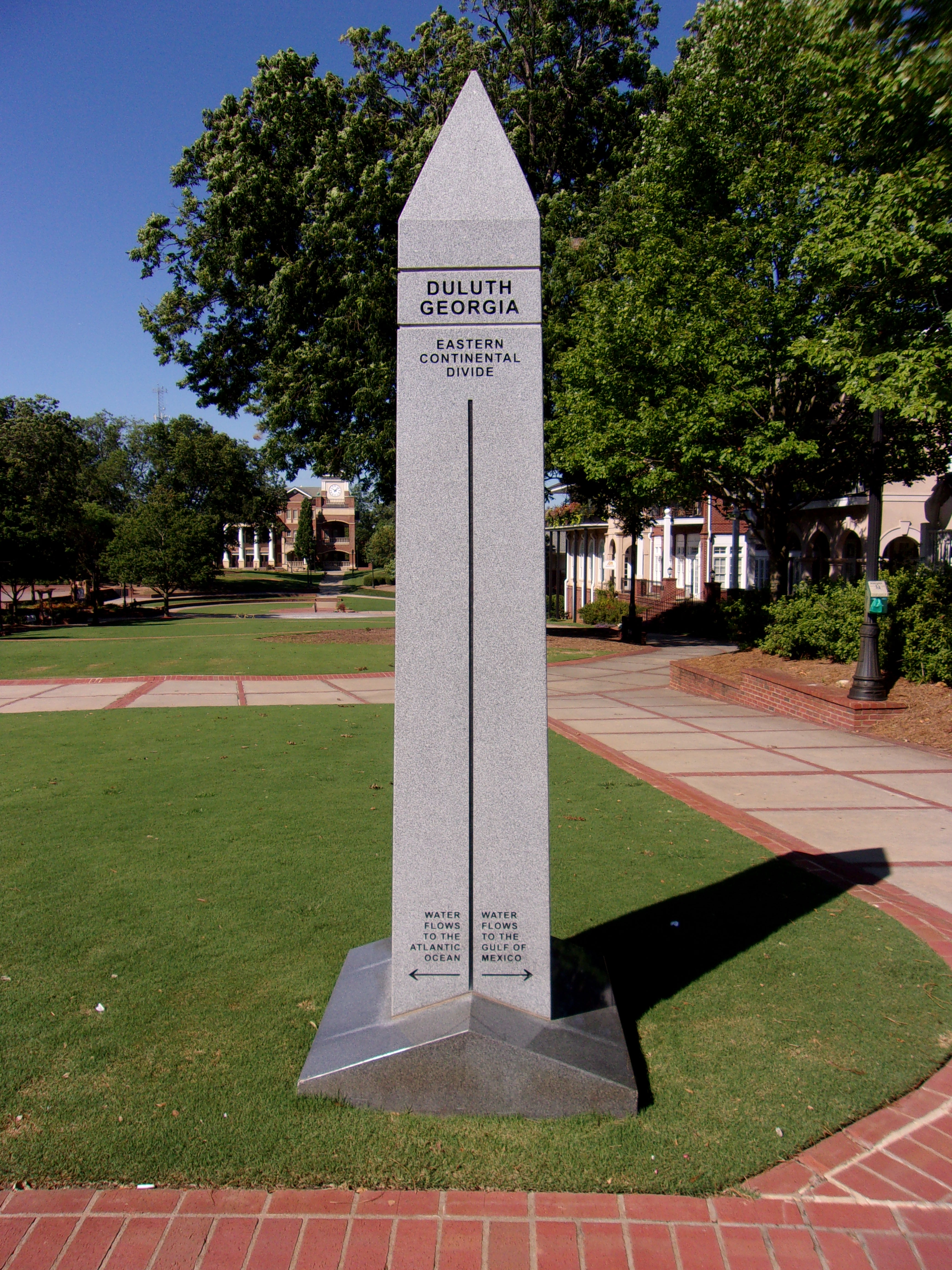
A monument marks the Eastern Continental Divide on the Duluth Town Green in Duluth, Georgia

Past the southern end of the Appalachian Mountains, the divide's southern portion winds through the lowlands of Georgia and Florida. In this portion, the western drainage of the divide flows into the watersheds of the Apalachicola River, Suwannee River, Withlacoochee River, and Peace River, all of which drain directly to the Gulf of Mexico. The eastern drainage flows into the watersheds of the Savannah River, Altamaha River, Satilla River, St. Marys River, and St. Johns River.

In Georgia, the Divide generally separates the Apalachicola River, watershed in the west from the Savannah River and Altamaha River watersheds to the east, passing through the Atlanta metropolitan area and extending past the southern end of the Appalachian Mountains southeasterly across the Georgia plateau. In southern Georgia, it separates the Suwannee River and Satilla River watersheds.

In Florida, the Divide generally follows the western edge of the St. Marys River and then St. Johns River, meandering into the low country of Northern Florida until it reaches Central Florida. The west side of the divide continues to be the Suwannee River and then the Withlacoochee River watersheds.

The southern terminus of the Eastern Continental Divide is at the triple divide between the Ocklawaha (a tributary of the St. Johns), Peace, and Kissimmee River watersheds, which is on the grounds of the Southern Dunes Golf and Country Club in Haines City, Florida on the Lake Wales Ridge. Because the Kissimmee River flows into Lake Okeechobee, whose distributaries reach both the Gulf of Mexico and the Atlantic Ocean via low swampland covered by a network of diverging canals and natural waterways, its watershed's land is not clearly divisible between the two watersheds.

== Weather ==
Because the divide is at or in proximity to the highest terrain, air is forced upwards regardless of wind direction. This process of orographic enhancement leads to higher precipitation than surrounding areas. In winter, the divide is often much snowier than surrounding areas, due to orographic enhancement and cooler temperatures with elevation.

== History ==
Prior to about 1760, north of Spanish Florida, the Appalachian Divide represented the boundary between British and French colonial possessions in North America. The Royal Proclamation of 1763 separated settled lands of the Thirteen Colonies from lands north and west of it designated the Indian Reserve; the proclamation border ran along the Appalachian Divide but extended beyond its Pennsylvania-New York terminus north into New England.

The exact route of the ECD shifts over time due to erosion, tectonic activity, construction projects, and other factors.

== Locations ==
ECD points
Location	State	Coordinates	Summit or other feature
Eastern Triple Divide	Pennsylvania	2,523 feet (769 m); 41°50′48″N 77°50′14″W	Triple Divide Peak, Ulysses Township, Potter County
I-80	Pennsylvania	41.1202°N 78.6347°W	
Babcock Ridge	Pennsylvania		
Allegheny Mountain	Pennsylvania	2,167 feet (661 m); 40°28′53″N 78°33′01″W	summit near Allegheny/Gallitzin Tunnels
Allegheny Mountain	Pennsylvania	2,690 feet (820 m); 39°57′41″N 78°51′24″W	summit above Allegheny Mountain Tunnel (Pennsylvania Turnpike)
Allegheny Mountain	Pennsylvania	2,460 feet (750 m); 39°48′37″N 78°57′38″W	summit above Sand Patch Tunnel
Savage Mountain	Pennsylvania	2,392 feet (729 m)39°45′12″N 78°54′58″W	railroad cut on Great Allegheny Passage
Savage Mountain	Pennsylvania/Maryland	2,840 feet (870 m); 39°43′21″N 78°54′51″W	highest summit of the Mason–Dixon line
I-68	Maryland	2,620 feet (800 m); 39.6828°N 79.037704°W	crossing near Green Lantern Road
Savage Mountain	Maryland	2,600 feet (790 m); 39°30′27″N 79°13′9″W	saddle point at planned route of 1828 C&O Canal
Backbone Mountain	Maryland/West Virginia	3,380 feet (1,030 m); 39°14′15″N 79°29′8″W (highest point)	Headwaters of Potomac River (Maryland's southern border) and Youghiogheny River
US 33 / WV 55	West Virginia	3,295 feet (1,004 m); 38.892050°N 79.467781°W	Saddle Point at Pendleton County and Randolph County.
I-64	West Virginia	2,460 feet (750 m); 37.787539°N 80.224528°W	Midland Trail: planned crossing for the 19th century James River and Kanawha Turnpike
Jefferson National Forest	Virginia	3,620 feet (1,100 m); 37°20′27″N 80°32′4″W	saddle point at Johns Creek headwaters (James River tributary), and near triple point of Mississippi River (W) & Chesapeake Bay (NE)/Albemarle Sound (Roanoke River) (SE)
Appalachian Trail	Virginia	3,397 feet (1,035 m); 37.380422°N 80.306368°W	Parallel Route Begin
Blacksburg, Virginia	Virginia	2,080 feet (630 m)	
Appalachian Trail	Virginia	3,224 feet (983 m); 37.343516°N 80.364647°W	Parallel Route Begin
I-81	Virginia	2,180 feet (660 m); 37.128708°N 80.371299°W	crossing
Christiansburg, Virginia	Virginia	2,180 feet (660 m); 37.094853°N 80.445558°W	2940 Riner Rd, Christiansburg, VA 24073
I-77	Virginia	2,860 feet (870 m); 36.650896°N 80.705609°W	crossing
US 21 / Blue Ridge Parkway	North Carolina	2,692 feet (821 m); 36.396259°N 80.986289°W	crossing at Roaring Gap, NC
Thurmond Chatham Wildlife Management Area	North Carolina	36.377344°N 81.220722°W	triple point of New River and Yadkin/West Prong Roaring rivers
US 321 at Blowing Rock, North Carolina	North Carolina	3,620 feet (1,100 m); 36.11844°N 81.66065°W	crossing at the Green Park Inn
NC 105	North Carolina	4,020 feet (1,230 m); 36.118190°N 81.838560°W	crossing
NC 226 and Blue Ridge Parkway	North Carolina	2,820 feet (860 m); 35.85266°N 82.0507166°W	crossing
I-40	North Carolina	2,786 feet (849 m); 35.618233°N 82.263007°W	crossing
US 74A	North Carolina	2,880 feet (880 m); 35.488843°N 82.358308°W	crossing
I-26	North Carolina	2,130 feet (650 m); 35.290048°N 82.40193°W	crossing
US 276	North Carolina	2,910 feet (890 m); 35.129807°N 82.63921°W	crossing
US 178	North Carolina	2,694 feet (821 m); 35.096133°N 82.80940°W	crossing, approx. 1 mile north of NC/SC border
French Broad watershed	North Carolina–South Carolina		tributary of the Tennessee River along NC/SC border dividing mountain ridges running southeast meets Santee watershed flowing into Atlantic
Sassafras Mountain	North Carolina–South Carolina	3,564 feet (1,086 m); 35°03′53″N 82°46′38″W	located along the South Carolina-North Carolina border in northern Pickens County, South Carolina, and southern Transylvania County, North Carolina, nearest to the town of Rosman, North Carolina
US 64	North Carolina	2,694 feet (821 m); 35.125507°N 82.910831°W	crossing
Savannah watershed	North Carolina–South Carolina		across the border of Pickens County, South Carolina & Greenville County, South Carolina, up into Transylvania County, North Carolina, Jackson County, North Carolina, and Macon County, North Carolina, to dividing mountain ridges to Tennessee River tributaries
NC 107	North Carolina	3,868 feet (1,179 m); 35°07′23″N 83°06′59″W	crossing
Cowee Gap	North Carolina	4,199 feet (1,280 m); 35°05′27″N 83°08′52″W	divides Tennessee (Cullasaja) and Savannah (Chatooga) rivers
Highlands, North Carolina	North Carolina	4,100 feet (1,200 m); 35°2′48.0408″N 83°11′13.434″W	Sunset Rock
NC 28	North Carolina	3,771 feet (1,149 m); 35.040808°N 83.202295°W	crossing
Black Rock Mountain State Park	Georgia	3,640 feet (1,110 m); 34.91472°N 83.34389°W	a Blue Ridge summit
ACF River Basin at Young Lick	Georgia	3,809 feet (1,161 m); 34°49′22″N 83°39′09″W	triple point at intersection of 3 GA counties: Hiwassee (Towns Co)/Chattahoochee River (Habersham Co) on the west & on the east: Savannah River (Rabun Co)
Altamaha watershed	Georgia		triple point along border of Hall & Banks (GA) counties: Chattahoochee River-Banks (west) & Altamaha River-Hall/Savannah River-Banks (east)
Suwanee watershed	Georgia		triple point: Chattahoochee River/Suwanee Creek (west) & Altamaha River (east)
I-85	Georgia	1,280 feet (390 m); 34.075235°N 83.917737°W	crossing (1 of 5)
I-85	Georgia	1,120 feet (340 m); 33.998098°N 84.07661°W	crossing (2 of 5)
Norcross, Georgia	Georgia	1,086 feet (331 m); 33.94558°N 84.21264°W	through Norcross historic district
I-85	Georgia	1,050 feet (320 m); 33.912202°N 84.207973°W	crossing (3 of 5)
I-285	Georgia	1,020 feet (310 m); 33.803115°N 84.250031°W	crossing (1 of 2)
Atlanta	Georgia		near Dekalb Av
I-75 / I-85	Georgia	1,020 feet (310 m); 33.752354°N 84.37942°W	crossing (1 of 4 crossings of I-75/4 of 5 crossings of I-85)
I-20	Georgia	1,050 feet (320 m); 33.741221°N 84.410663°W	crossing
I-85	Georgia	1,000 feet (300 m); 33.661782°N 84.4274°W	crossing (5 of 5)
I-75	Georgia	976 feet (297 m); 33°39′19.60″N 84°23′42.52″W	crossing (2 of 4)
I-285	Georgia	960 feet (290 m); 33°37′51.56″N 84°23′34.40″W	crossing (2 of 2)
I-75	Georgia	927 feet (283 m); 33°34′29.77″N 84°20′7.67″W	crossing (3 of 4)
Atlantic Seaboard fall line	Georgia		near Macon, Georgia, this intersection is a triple physiographic point of the Piedmont (to the north) and the Gulf & Atlantic coastal plains (southwest & southeast).
I-75	Georgia	410 feet (120 m); 32°10′16.10″N 83°45′9.25″W	crossing (4 of 4)
Satilla watershed	Georgia		triple point: Suwannee (west) & Altamaha River/Satilla River (east)
St. Marys watershed	Georgia		triple point: Suwannee (west) & Satilla River/St. Marys River (east)
St. Johns watershed	Florida		triple point: Suwannee (west) & St. Marys River/St. Johns River (east)
I-10	Florida	159 feet (48 m); 30°15′14.64″N 82°23′57.84″W	crossing
Florida Trail	Florida		Central Florida crossing over the Florida crustal arch
Withlacoochee watershed	Florida		triple point: Suwannee/Withlacoochee River (Florida) (west) & St. Johns River (east)
Miami watershed	Florida		triple point: Withlacoochee (west) & St. Johns River/Miami River (east)
Kissimmee/Okeechobee watershed	Florida		south point of ECD @ Withlacoochee & Miami/Kissimmee triple point

== See also ==
- Continental Divide of the Americas
- Great Basin Divide
- Laurentian Divide
- Saint Lawrence River Divide
