= Transportation in Appalachia =

Transportation in the Appalachian region

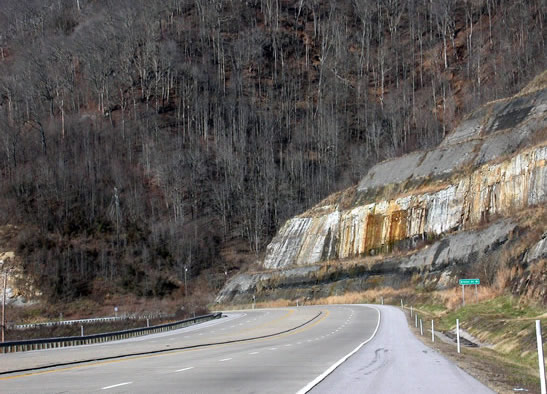
US 52/119 north of Williamson, West Virginia

Transportation in Appalachia covers transportation within the Appalachian region. Historically, the region has had to allocate much resources and time into transportation due to the region's geography, which includes stretches of mountainous terrain. This terrain, combined with commonly occurring adverse weather effects such as heavy fog and snowfall, often make roads hazardous and taxing for vehicles. Early European settlers were forced to rely on gaps in the mountains, among them the Cumberland Gap and the Wilderness Road. Today, the most influential forms of travel in the Appalachian region are based on water trading routes, roads and railroads.

== Early roads ==
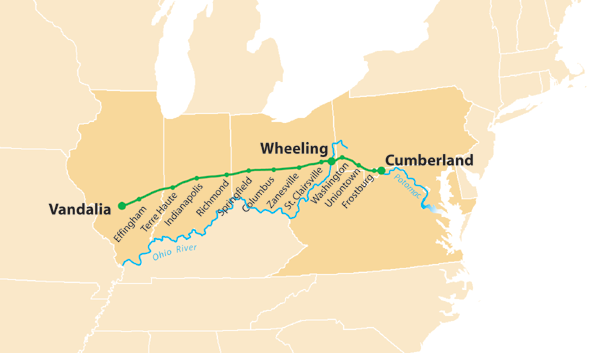
Map showing the route of the National Road at its greatest completion in 1839, with historical state boundaries

Native American trails were the first in Appalachia. After their arrival in the region, European settlers would utilize these trails in addition to creating their own. One of the earliest Native American trails used by Europeans was Nemacolin's Path, a trail between the Potomac and the Monongahela River passing from present-day Cumberland, Maryland, an hub in the early days of European presence in the region, to the mouth of Redstone Creek, where Brownsville, Pennsylvania is situated today.

The French and Indian War created a greater need for roads through Appalachia. In 1755, General Edward Braddock of the Coldstream Guards was sent to route the French from Fort Duquesne along Nemacolin's Path. Braddock's army cut a military trail through the wilderness from Fort Cumberland, which would become known as Braddock's Road. In 1758, General John Forbes of England created a road from Chambersburg to Pittsburgh during the French and Indian War, later known as the Pittsburgh Road and the Conestoga Road.

The first highway to be built through Appalachia, as well as the United States' first great federally financed highway, was the National Road, authorized in 1806 by President Thomas Jefferson. Beginning in Cumberland, the road generally followed Braddock's Road, heading west first to Wheeling, Virginia and, with later expansions, to Vandalia. Other roads soon followed, such as the Northwestern Turnpike and James River and Kanawha Turnpike.

== Water ==
By 1772, George Washington had identified the Potomac and James rivers as the most promising locations for canals to be built to join with the western rivers. Washington proposed a canal to connect the Potomac River and the Ohio River and founded the Potowmack Company. In 1824, the holdings of the Potowmack Company were ceded to the Chesapeake and Ohio Company. Construction of the proposed canal began with a groundbreaking ceremony on July 4, 1828, by President John Quincy Adams. The canal followed the course of the Potomac River to Cumberland, Maryland. Had it been completed, it would have continued west from Cumberland along the Potomac River and then followed the Savage River, crossing the Eastern Continental Divide near present-day Deep Creek Lake, and eventually following the Youghiogheny River to navigable waters.

The upper Potomac and its various off-shooting tributaries are commonly used methods of transportation for trade in the region. Historically, riverboats of commerce would use the Potomac to allow easy supply of shipments, often flour, to local areas across Appalachia, particularly those near the edge of western Maryland's border, such as Allegheny and Garrett counties. Waterways in Appalachia allowed for the energy-efficient movement of heavy resources such as lumber downstream, avoiding the complications associated with moving harvested materials from Appalachian forests across land. Appalachian lumber workers use pike poles to control logs floating on a river and to construct log rafts. Pike poles used in log rafting were originally made of wood, often spruce wood, but more modern versions of the tool are almost always made of various metals.

Washington first proposed the James River and Kanawha Canal when he was a young man surveying the mountains of western Virginia. In 1785, the James River Company was formed, with George Washington as honorary president, to build locks around the falls at Richmond. By then, Washington was quite busy since he was elected president in 1789. The goal was to reach the Kanawha River at its head of navigation about 30 miles (48 km) east of what is today Charleston, West Virginia. The canal eventually extended 196.5 miles (316.2 km) west of Richmond to Buchanan, Virginia. By 1851, westward progress had stopped due to increasing competition from the railroads.

Today, river systems continue to provide transport through barge traffic on the Ohio River system. The Monongahela River is navigable its entire length, spanning from West Virginia to Pennsylvania, with a series of lock/dams ensuring a 9-foot (2.7 m) depth.

== Rail ==
The next major transportation leap for Appalachia was the railroad. The Baltimore and Ohio was the first to cross. It was finished to Piedmont, Virginia on July 21, 1851, Fairmont on June 22, 1852, and its terminus at Wheeling on January 1, 1853.

The West Virginia Central and Pittsburg Railway, operating in the late 19th and early 20th centuries, was a notable means of transportation throughout Appalachia. The railway was primarily designed for travel in between some older West Virginian communities (such as Belington, Huttonsville, and Durbin), but traveled to Cumberland, Maryland when traveling north, making it a multi-state operating travel system. It was also a positive economic driver, as the track construction was built privately with the assistance of several subsidiary companies.

In 1855 the Norfolk and Western Railway, under the direction of Frederick J. Kimball, began to push across Appalachia. Starting from Big Lick, the lines extended to the Pocahontas coalfields in western Virginia and West Virginia and on north to Columbus and Cincinnati, Ohio.

The Southern Railway linked Charleston, South Carolina, and Memphis, Tennessee, crossing Appalachia in 1857 in the Asheville, North Carolina area, though rail expansion temporarily halted with the start of the Civil War.

By 1867 the Chesapeake and Ohio Railway had reached the eastern edge of the mountains and was also reaching for the Ohio valley via the New River and Kanawha valleys of West Virginia. The West Virginia stretch of the C&O was the site of the legendary competition between John Henry and a steam-powered machine; the competition is said to have taken place in a tunnel south of Talcott, West Virginia, near the Greenbrier River. In 1888, the C&O built the Cincinnati Division, from Huntington, West Virginia, down the south bank of the Ohio River in Kentucky and across the river at Cincinnati, connecting with the "Big Four" and other midwestern railroads.

Henry G. Davis started the West Virginia Central and Pittsburg Railway in 1880. In the ensuing years, it opened a huge swathe of timber and coal territory in northern West Virginia to use. It started in Piedmont, West Virginia, and pushed west creating such towns as Elkins, Davis and Thomas. It pushed east to Cumberland, where it connected with traffic from the C&O Canal and the National Road. Davis created the Coal & Coke Railway, which headed west from Elkins to Charleston, completing another crossing. These eventually formed the core of the Western Maryland Railway. The Western Maryland's Connellsville Extension was built west from Cumberland to Connellsville, Pennsylvania, beginning around 1906 and was completed in 1912.

Railroad transportation evolved greatly through time, though flooding after rainfalls became common as many of the trees and wildlife holding in water were removed for the lumber industry. Technological progression benefited Appalachian railways however, as advancements in technology soon led to the implementation of crane and lift technology used for lifting heavy materials onto trains for transport, which was previously performed by hand, and drastically increased the productivity of the railway based resource harvesting market.

Today, the crossing of the Eastern Continental Divide by the West Virginia Central and Pittsburg Railway is abandoned and is used as a Rails to Trails corridor. The other crossings are either part of CSX or the Norfolk Southern Railway and remain the only rail crossings of Appalachia. Cumberland still serves as a major rail hub for Appalachia where two main lines head west.

== Highways ==
Auto trail sign pre-U.S. Highway system

In 1880 the Good Roads Movement was formed in the context of inadequate access to suitable roads outside of urban areas. In its early years, the main goal of the movement was to provide for road building in rural areas between cities, including much of Appalachia, to help rural populations gain the social and economic benefits enjoyed by cities where citizens benefitted from railroads, trolleys and paved streets. This eventually led to the auto trail system of highways. The first crossing in Appalachia was the Lincoln Highway, which would later become US 30. This was closely followed by the Dixie Highway, first planned in 1914 to connect the US Midwest with the Southern United States, crossing Appalachia following what is now US 25. Other auto trails crossing Appalachia include the Jefferson Davis Highway, Lakes-to-Sea Highway, Lee Highway, and National Old Trails Highway.

The next great leap in transportation was the creation of the U.S. Highway system in 1926, replacing the auto trails. The longest primary US highway contained in Appalachia is US 11 traversing the eastern side. US 21 was another primary US highway, but much of its route has been decommissioned and replaced with Interstate 77. These make/made up the north–south routes. East–west routes include US 30, US 33, US 40, US 50, US 60, and US 70. Many spur routes such as US 220 and US 119 serve various parts of Appalachia.

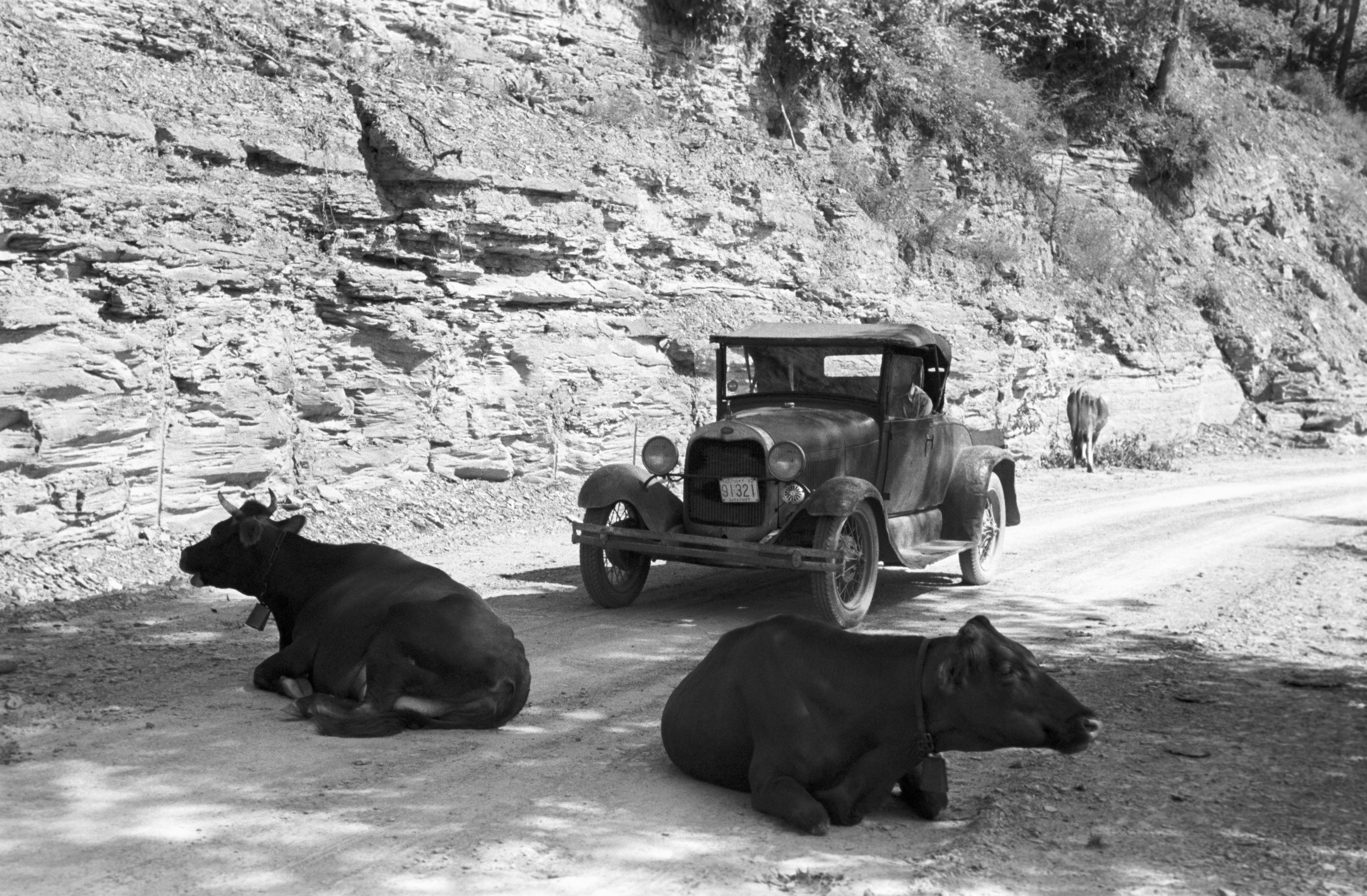
Local transport conditions in Appalachia during the mid-twentieth century. Cattle rest on an unpaved mountain road in Breathitt County, Kentucky, 1940. Photo by Marion Post Wolcott.

The Pennsylvania Turnpike was the first long-distance rural controlled-access highway in the United States and also the first one to cross Appalachia, often termed the "world's first superhighway". It was known as the "tunnel highway" because of the seven mountain tunnels along its Appalachian route. On October 1, 1940, the first section of turnpike opened, running from US 11 near Carlisle (southwest of Harrisburg) west to US 30 at Irwin (east of Pittsburgh). Crossing was completed with the Western Extension, from Irwin to US 22 east of Pittsburgh, opened August 7, 1951. The remainder opened to traffic on December 26, 1951, taking the highway west almost to the Ohio state line. Today, the road is over 550 miles long, much longer than its original length, continuing to provide reliable long-distance transportation for drivers, supporting economic growth and logistical efficiency.

The Pennsylvania Turnpike remained the only superhighway crossing Appalachia until the interstate system that was authorized by the Federal-Aid Highway Act of 1956. Today seven Interstates cross Appalachia east to west: Interstate 86, Interstate 80, Interstate 70, Interstate 64, Interstate 26, and Interstate 40. There are three Interstates crossing north to south: Interstate 75, Interstate 77 and Interstate 81. Interstate 26 in particular is undergoing an extension from Asheville, North Carolina to Kingsport, Tennessee. Among the projects associated with the extension is a future multi-million dollar bridge crossing the French Broad River in Asheville.

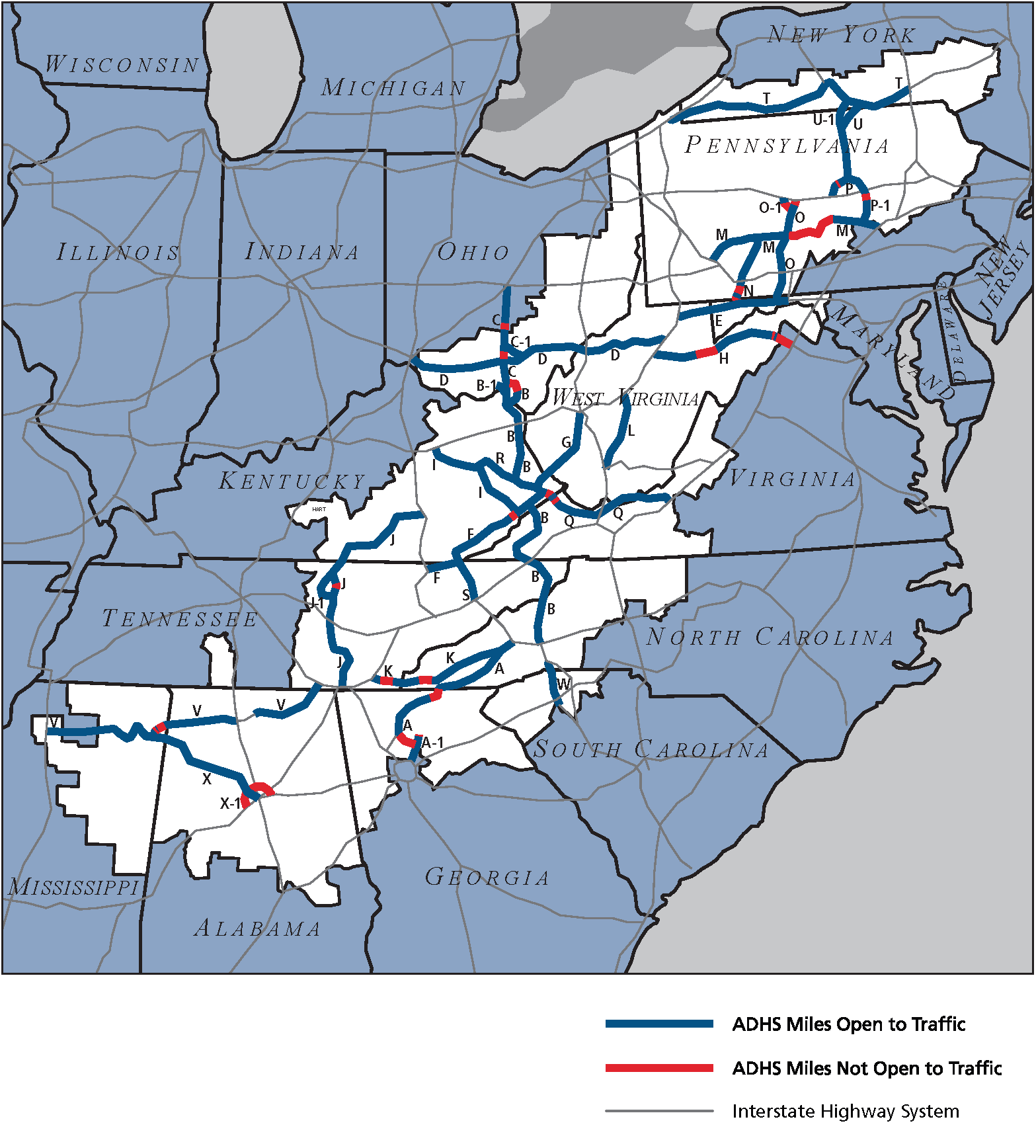
Appalachian Development Highway System

Despite the fact that the region is crisscrossed by many U.S. and Interstate highways, those routes primarily serve cross-country traffic rather than locals themselves. Towns closer to the major highways and nearer to the many larger cities fringing the region (Pittsburgh, Wheeling, Columbus, Cincinnati, Atlanta, Washington, D.C., etc.) are disproportionately better-off than rural regions in the mountainous interior. Instead of being tied to the land, jobs in the towns tend to emphasize industry and services—important signs of a more diversified economy.

To reverse decline and spur economic growth, Appalachian governors have prioritized the creation of a modern highway system accessible to local residents as the key to economic development. As a result, in 1965, the Appalachian Regional Commission created the Appalachian Development Highway System (ADHS) which was the first highway system designed specifically to service Appalachia. The ADHS was designed to generate economic development in previously isolated areas, supplement the Interstate system, connect Appalachia to the interstate system, and provide access to areas within the region as well as to markets in the rest of the nation. The ADHS is currently authorized at 3,090 miles (4,970 km), including 65 miles (105 km) added in January 2004.

These routes are known as corridors. They are built to a higher standard than US Highways, but less than Interstate standard, although some such as Corridor E were built to be interstates.

== Recreation ==
The creation in 1936 of the Appalachian Trail, which stretches from Georgia to Maine, helped open the area to hikers and outdoor enthusiasts from all over the world.

== See also ==
- Appalachia
- I-73/74 North–South Corridor
- Tennessee Valley Authority
