= Dravo Cemetery =

Historic cemetery in Allegheny County, Pennsylvania

Coordinates: 40.289216°N 79.778386°W

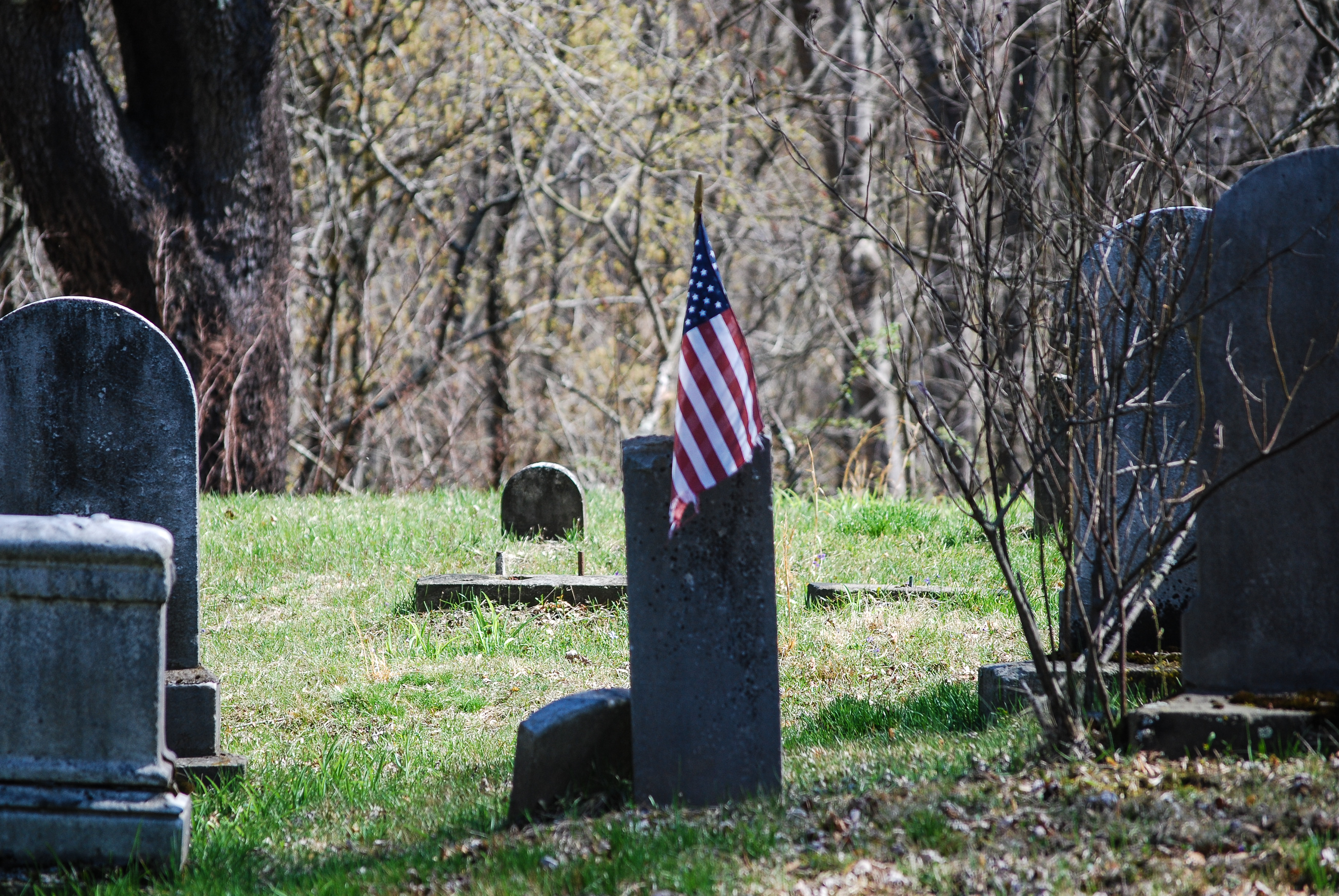
- Interactive map of Dravo Cemetery

Details
- Established: 1812
- Abandoned: 1924
- Location: Buena Vista, Pennsylvania
- Country: United States
- Owned by: Elizabeth Township Historical Society
- Size: 0.5 acres
- No. of graves: 708
- Website: Elizabeth Township Historical Society

The Dravo Cemetery, sometimes called the Historic Dravo Cemetery, is a cemetery located in Elizabeth Township along the Youghiogheny River Trail, south of Pittsburgh, Pennsylvania. Originally built as a family cemetery by Nathan Newlin in 1812, the cemetery was renamed Dravo Cemetery after being acquired by Reverend Dravo who built the Dravo Methodist Church on the property in 1824. The church burned down twice and the property was eventually abandoned. The cemetery has been maintained by the Elizabeth Township Historical Society since 1986.

== Overview ==
The cemetery contains 708 graves dating back to 1812. Only 81 of the graves are identified. Among the graves are many graves of children, demonstrating the effect that childhood disease had on the community. Ten war veterans are buried here: 9 veterans of the Civil War and 1 veteran of the War of 1812.

== History ==
The cemetery was first built by European immigrant Nathan Newlon in 1812. Newlon worked as a farmer in the land west of the Youghiogheny River. Newlon eventually earned enough money to buy additional land along the river, and converted part of the land he acquired into a cemetery for the members of his family who had died. Newlon himself was buried in the cemetery after his death in 1820.

Reverend William Dravo then purchased the land to build a larger church for the local community. His church, called the Dravo Methodist Church, was built in 1824, and took ownership of the cemetery on the property.

Around the turn of the century, the church burned down for reasons that were unclear at the time. The church was rebuilt and services resumed. In 1924 the church burned down again, this time under suspicion of arson. The police investigation determined that the church had been set on fire by sparks from the nearby train tracks. Due to the discovery, the church was abandoned for fear of burning down again and parishioners attended different nearby churches.

A newspaper article in 2001 about the cemetery generated new interest, and caused more local residents to visit the cemetery.

== Dravo Historic Cemetery ==
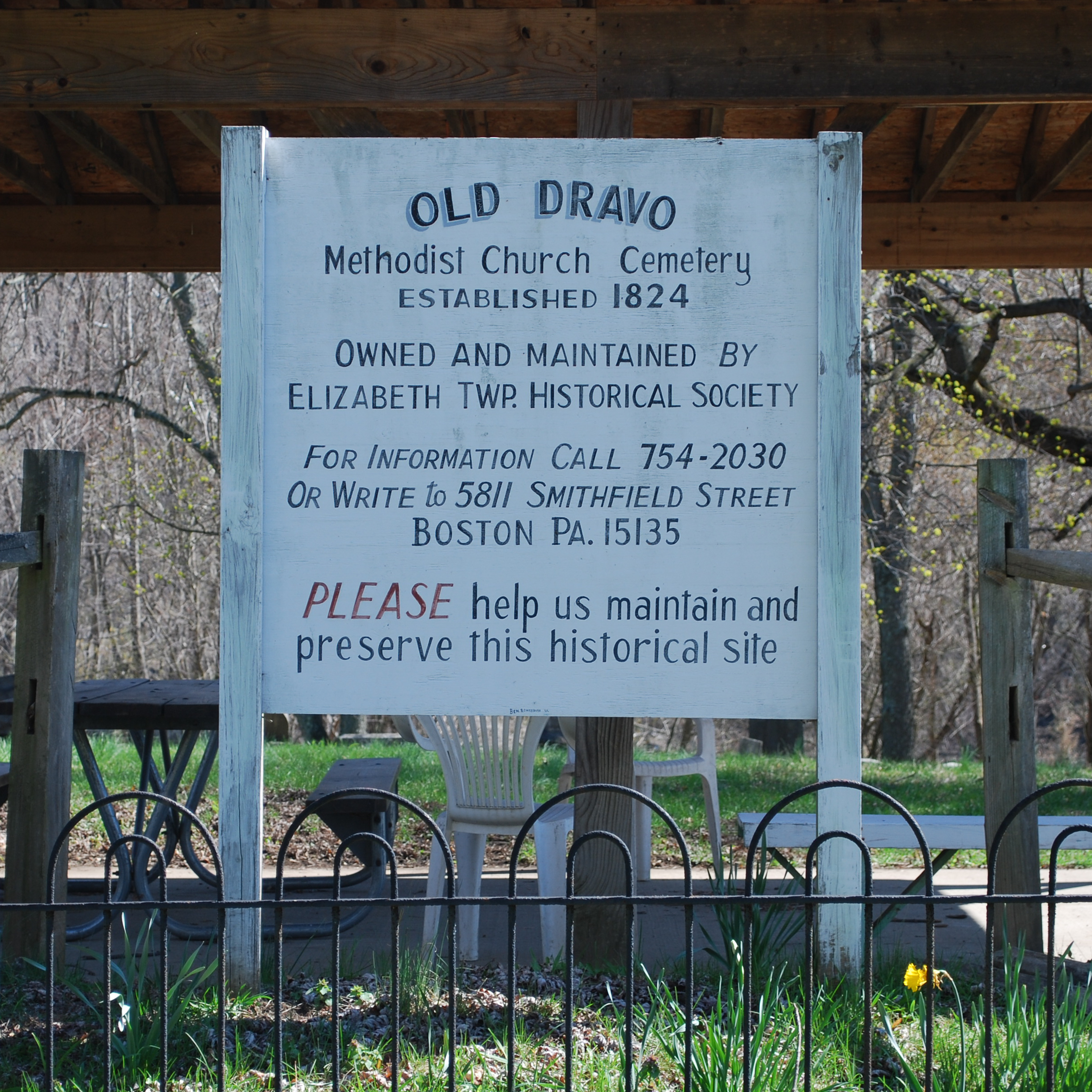

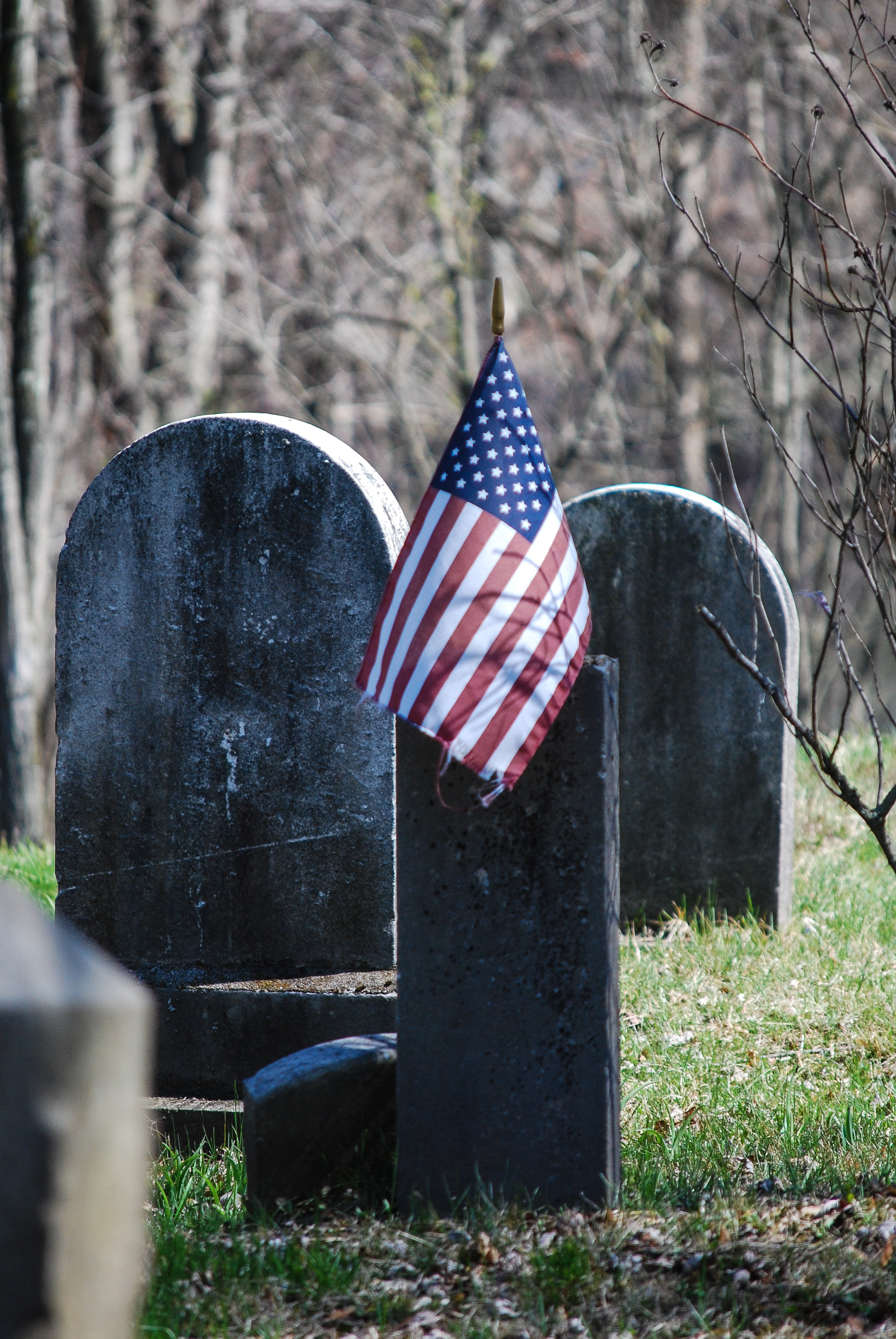

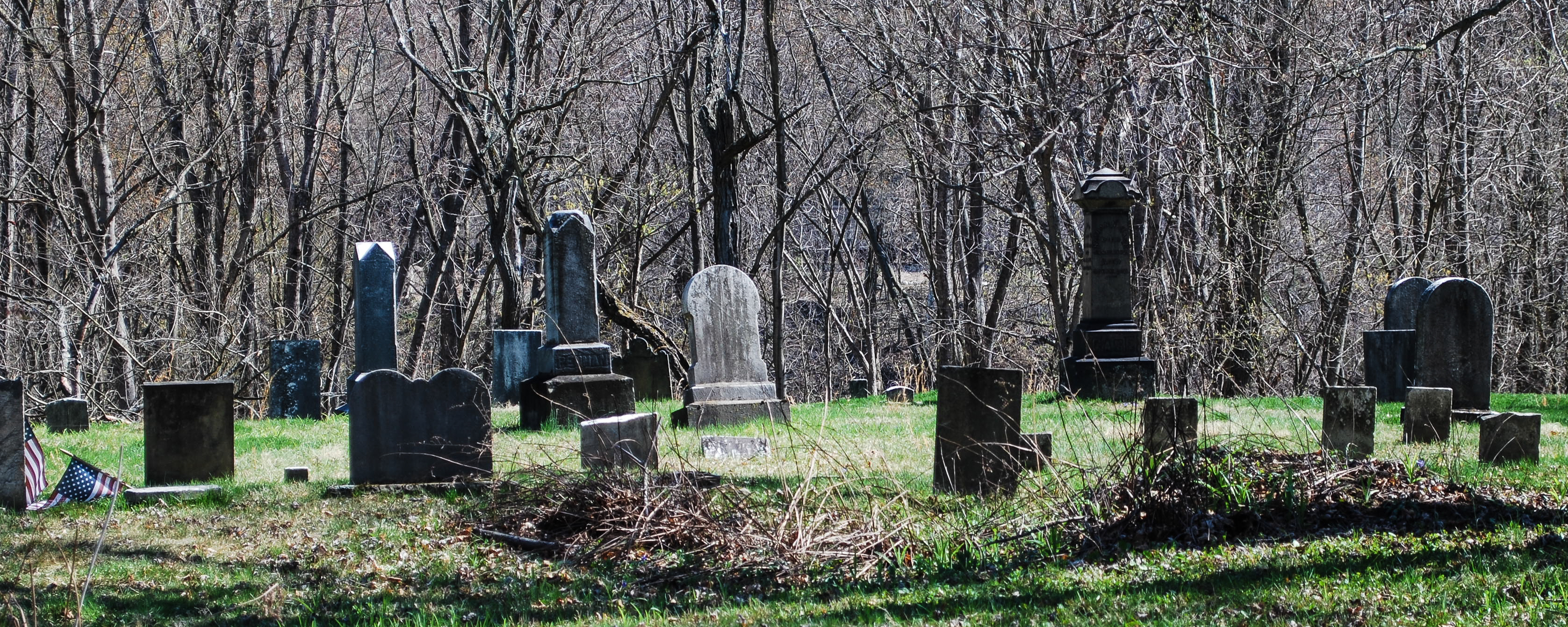

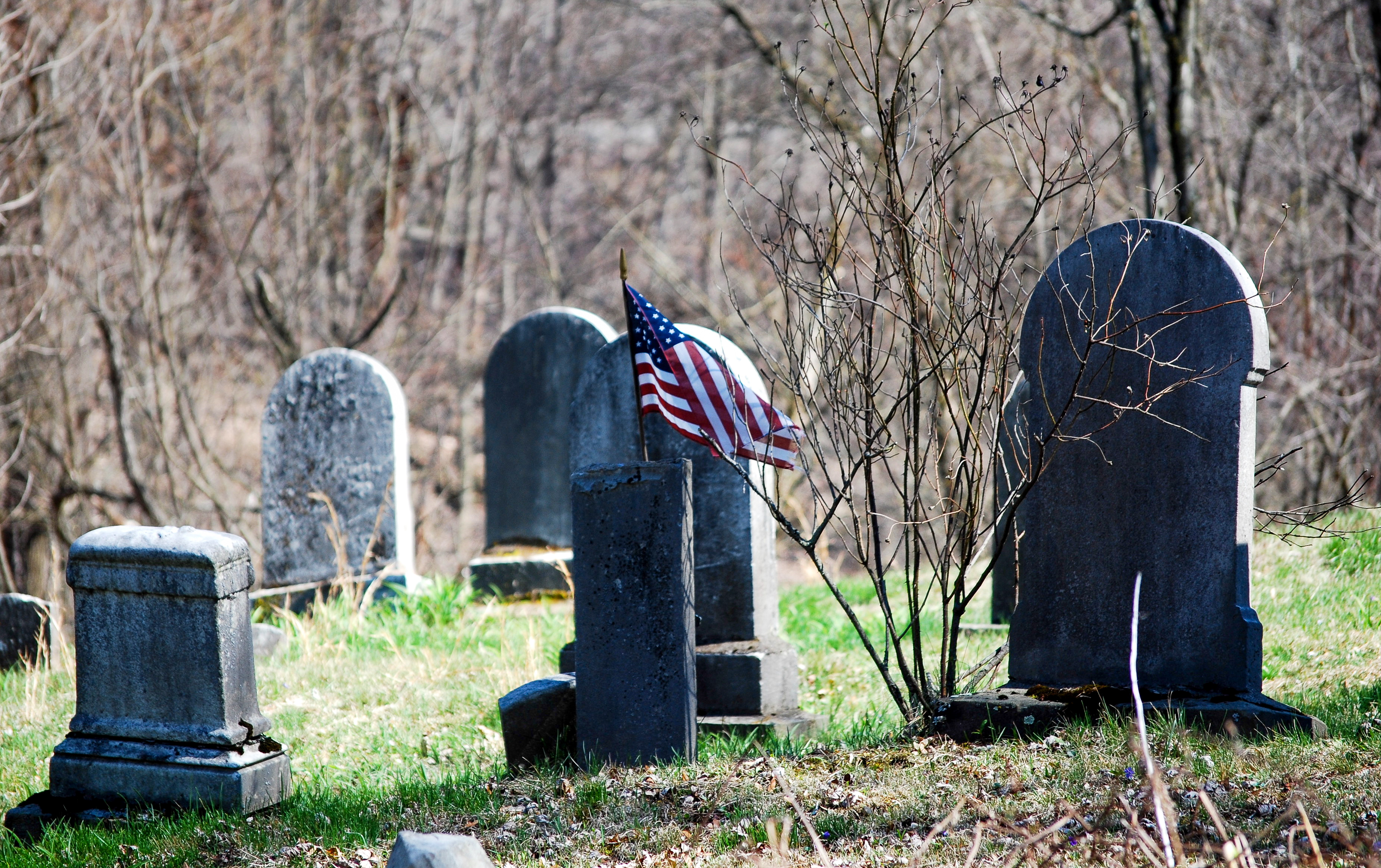

== Legends ==
Some local residents claim that the cemetery is haunted and claim have seen things such as a two-headed dog or a ghost train. In the 1970s it is alleged that the cemetery was the location of a hazing event by a college fraternity, although no one was ultimately hurt.
