= Salisbury Viaduct =

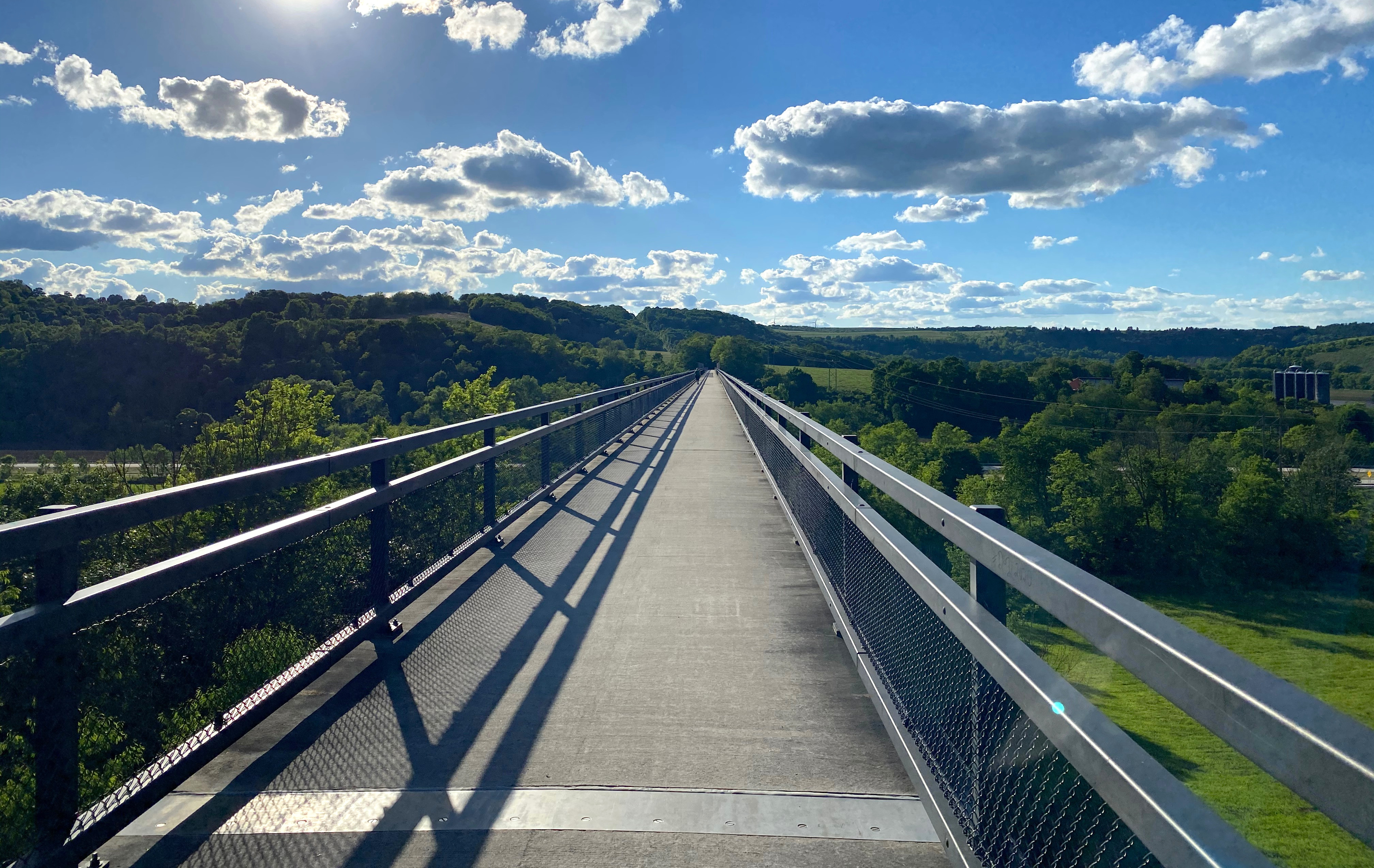
- Coordinates: 39°50′1.5″N 79°02′41.5″W.
- Carries: Great Allegheny Passage
- Crosses: Casselman River, Flight 93 Memorial Highway
- Locale: Meyersdale, Pennsylvania

Characteristics
- Design: Trestle
- Total length: 1,908 feet (582 m)

History
- Opened: 1912

The Salisbury Viaduct is a bridge in Somerset County, Pennsylvania near Meyersdale that spans the Casselman River valley. Built in 1912 by the Western Maryland Railway for its Connellsville Extension, it was built to accommodate two tracks, but only one was ever installed. It was decommissioned in 1975; in 1998, after being modified for use as a rail trail, it opened to pedestrians and cyclists as part of the Great Allegheny Passage.
