= Big Savage Tunnel =

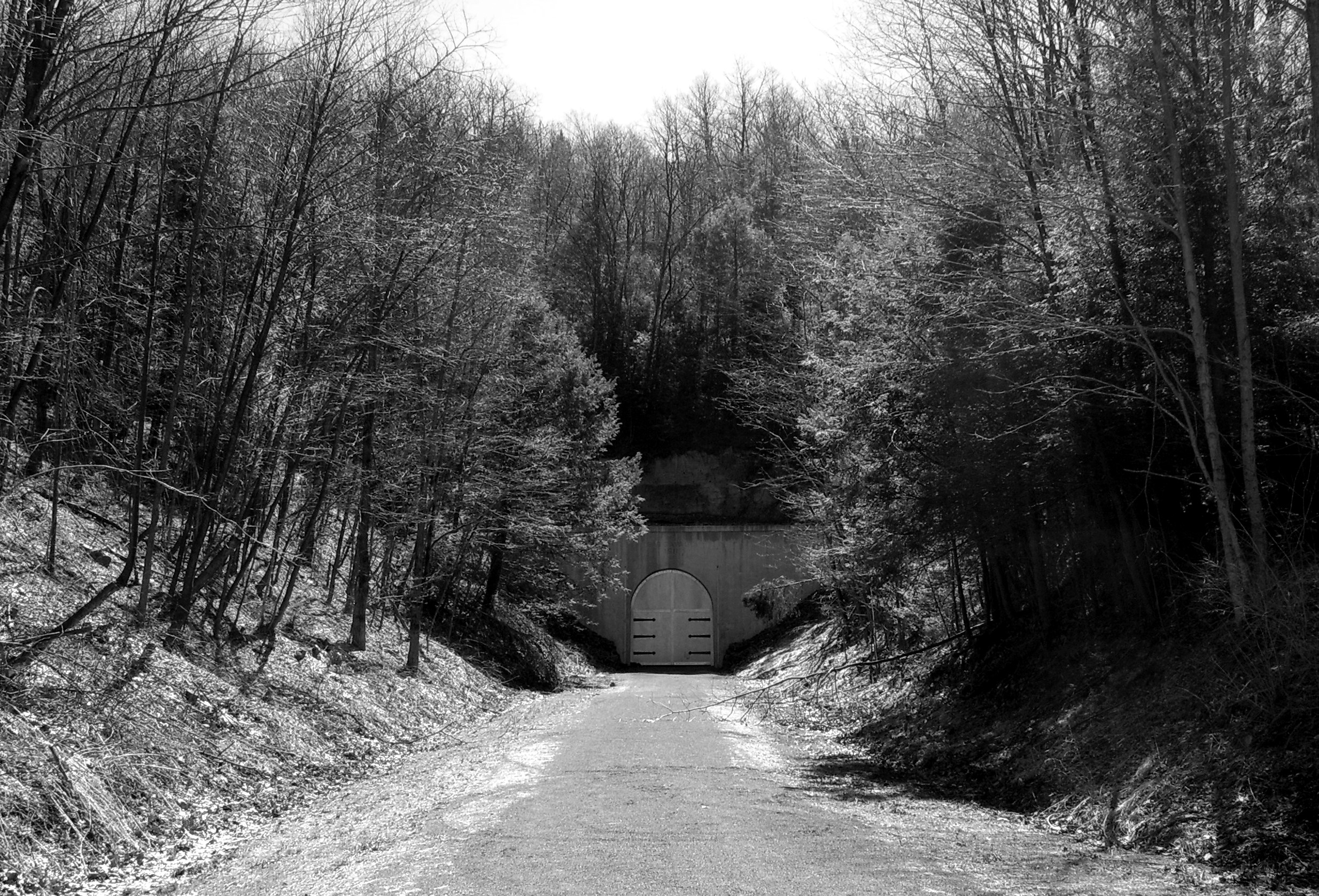
- Interactive map of Big Savage Tunnel

Overview
- Location: Somerset County, Pennsylvania
- Coordinates: 39°44′27″N 78°53′37″W
- Status: restored, converted to rail trail
- System: Western Maryland Railway (defunct)

Operation
- Work began: 1911
- Opened: 1912
- Closed: 1975 (rail line abandoned), renovated in 2005 and reopened

Technical
- Length: 3,294.6 feet (1,004.2 m)
- No. of tracks: Single
- Track gauge: 4 ft 8 1/2 in (1,435 mm) standard gauge
- Max elevation: 2,351 feet (717 m)
- Grade: 0.55%

The Big Savage Tunnel is a rail trail tunnel located about 9 miles (14 km) southeast of Meyersdale, Pennsylvania. It, as well as the Pinkerton Tunnel, Borden Tunnel, and Brush Tunnel are part of the Great Allegheny Passage trail. It was originally built for the Connellsville subdivision of the Western Maryland Railway.

== Origin of the name ==
The mountain and tunnel are named for John Savage, an early surveyor who narrowly avoided becoming a victim of cannibalism in the area in 1736. While he was surveying the land in the wintertime, the circumstances became dire and he offered himself up as food, but the rest of the survey party declined.

== Renovation ==
The tunnel was renovated for use on the Great Allegheny Passage rail trail. It is the longest tunnel on the trail.

The tunnel is closed between roughly December 15 and April 10 each winter to protect it from icing damage.
