= Great Allegheny Passage =

Rail trail connecting Cumberland, Maryland, and Pittsburgh, Pennsylvania

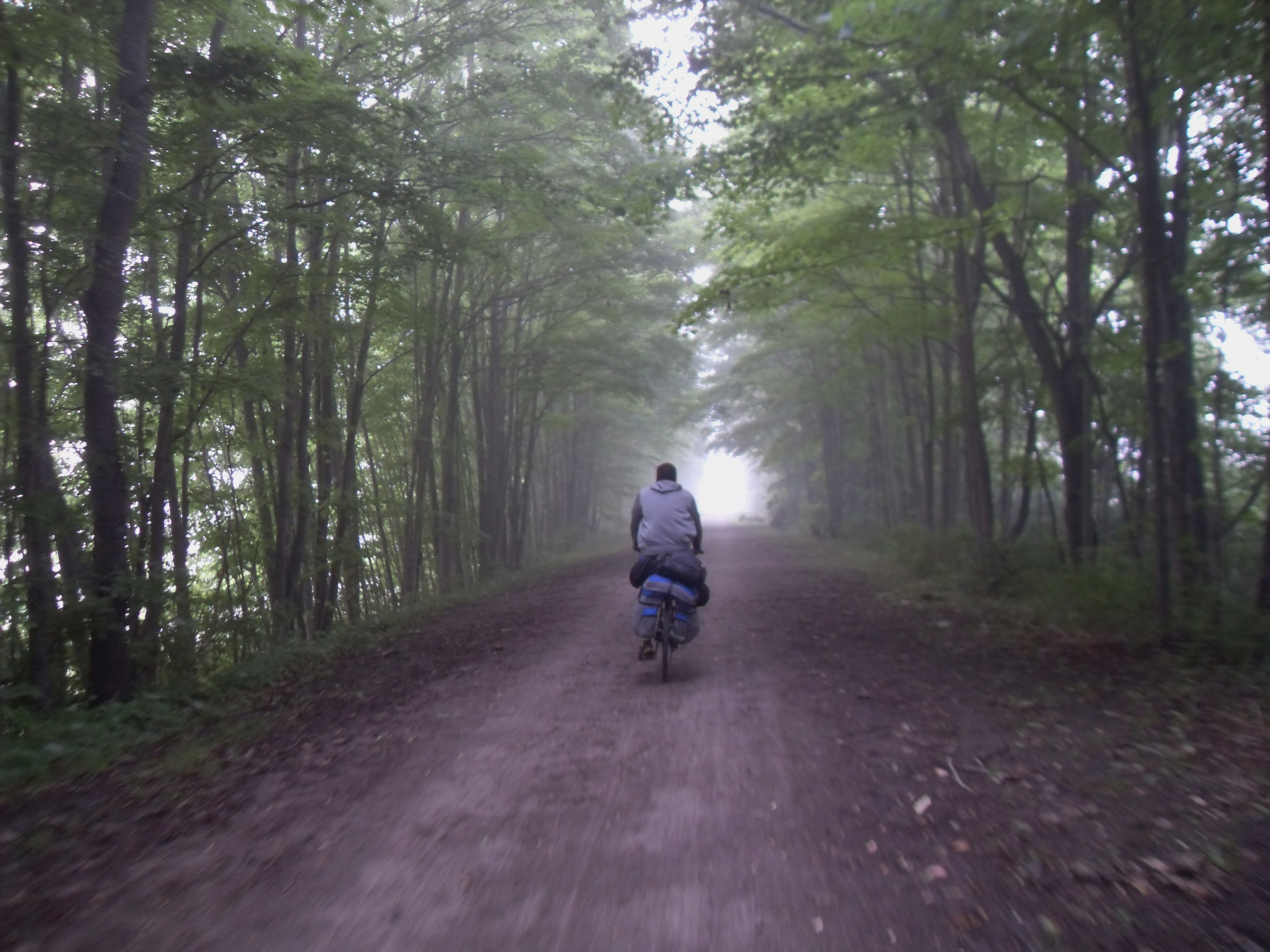
- Length: 150 mi (240 km)
- Location: Western Pennsylvania and Maryland
- Designation: National Recreation Trail; USBR 50
- Trailheads: Cumberland, Maryland; 39.64863°N 78.76210°W; Pittsburgh, Pennsylvania; 40.43504°N 79.99611°W
- Use: Hiking, cycling
- Elevation change: western: 1,066 feet (325 m); eastern 1,786 feet (544 m)
- Highest point: Eastern Continental Divide just east of Deal, Pennsylvania, 2,392 ft (729 m)
- Lowest point: east end: 606 feet (185 m) at Cumberland, Maryland; west end: 720 feet (220 m) at Point State Park, Pittsburgh, Pennsylvania
- Grade: 2% maximum
- Difficulty: Easy
- Hazards: Severe weather, Traffic (Pittsburgh)
- Surface: Crushed limestone
- Right of way: Baltimore and Ohio Railroad; Pittsburgh and Lake Erie Railroad; Union Railroad; Western Maryland Railway
Trail map

The Great Allegheny Passage (GAP) is a 150-mile (240 km) rail trail between Pittsburgh, Pennsylvania and Cumberland, Maryland. Together with the C&O Canal towpath, the GAP is part of a 335 mi (539 km) route between Pittsburgh and Washington, D.C., that is popular with through hikers and cyclists.

== History ==
The GAP follows former right-of-way of the Baltimore and Ohio Railroad, Pittsburgh and Lake Erie Railroad, Union Railroad, and Western Maryland Railway.

The first section of the GAP—9 mi (14 km) near Ohiopyle—opened in 1986. The 9-mile (14 km) section between Woodcock Hollow and Cumberland opened on December 13, 2006. The GAP was completed in 2013 when the section between West Homestead and Point State Park in Pittsburgh opened. The completion project was named The Point Made, reflecting the fact that it was now possible to reach Point State Park from Washington, D.C. Celebrations took place on June 15, 2013. With its opening, Pennsylvania became the state with the most rail trails—900 mi (1,400 km), with 1,100 mi (1,800 km) more under development.

The overall construction cost for the GAP was $80 million.

The Allegheny Trail Alliance (ATA) was founded in 1995 as an umbrella organization for the GAP's seven trail organizations, which include Friends of the Riverfront, Steel Valley Trail, Regional Trail Corporation, Ohiopyle State Park, and Mountain Maryland Trails. Each organization maintains a particular section of the GAP. The ATA was later renamed The Great Allegheny Passage Conservancy.

The original name for the GAP was Cumberland and Pittsburgh Trail. Great Allegheny Passage was selected in 2001 by the ATA after six years and more than 100 proposals as a name evocative of the geography and historical heritage of the trail. It was suggested by Bill Metzger, editor of the ATA newsletter. The runner-up was Allegheny Frontier Trail.

== Route ==
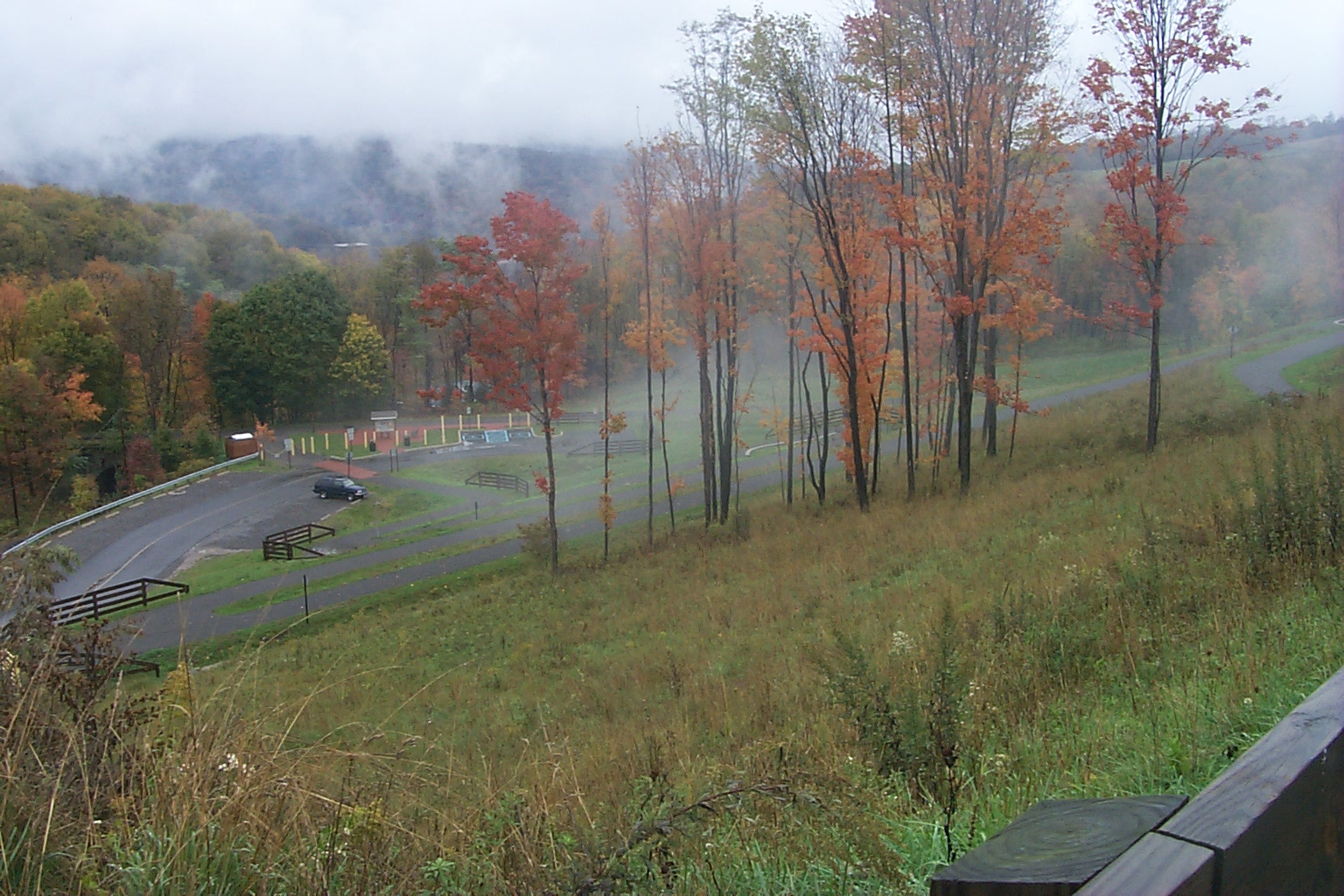
Frostburg trailhead, from top of access trail

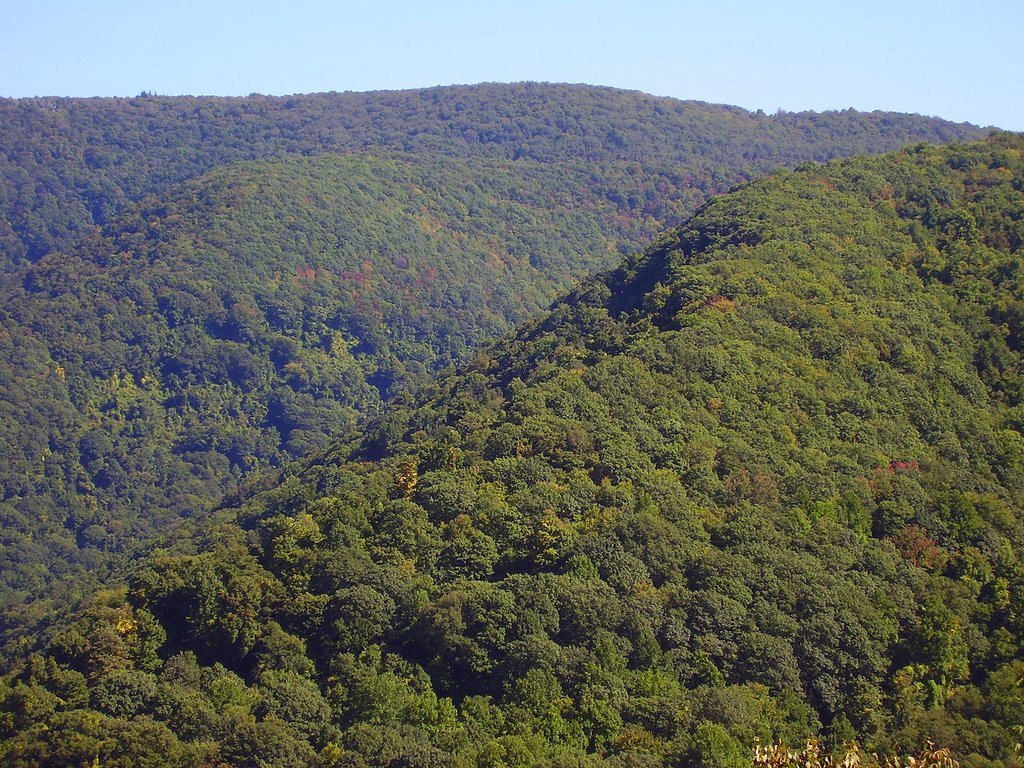
Allegheny Mountains along the trail route

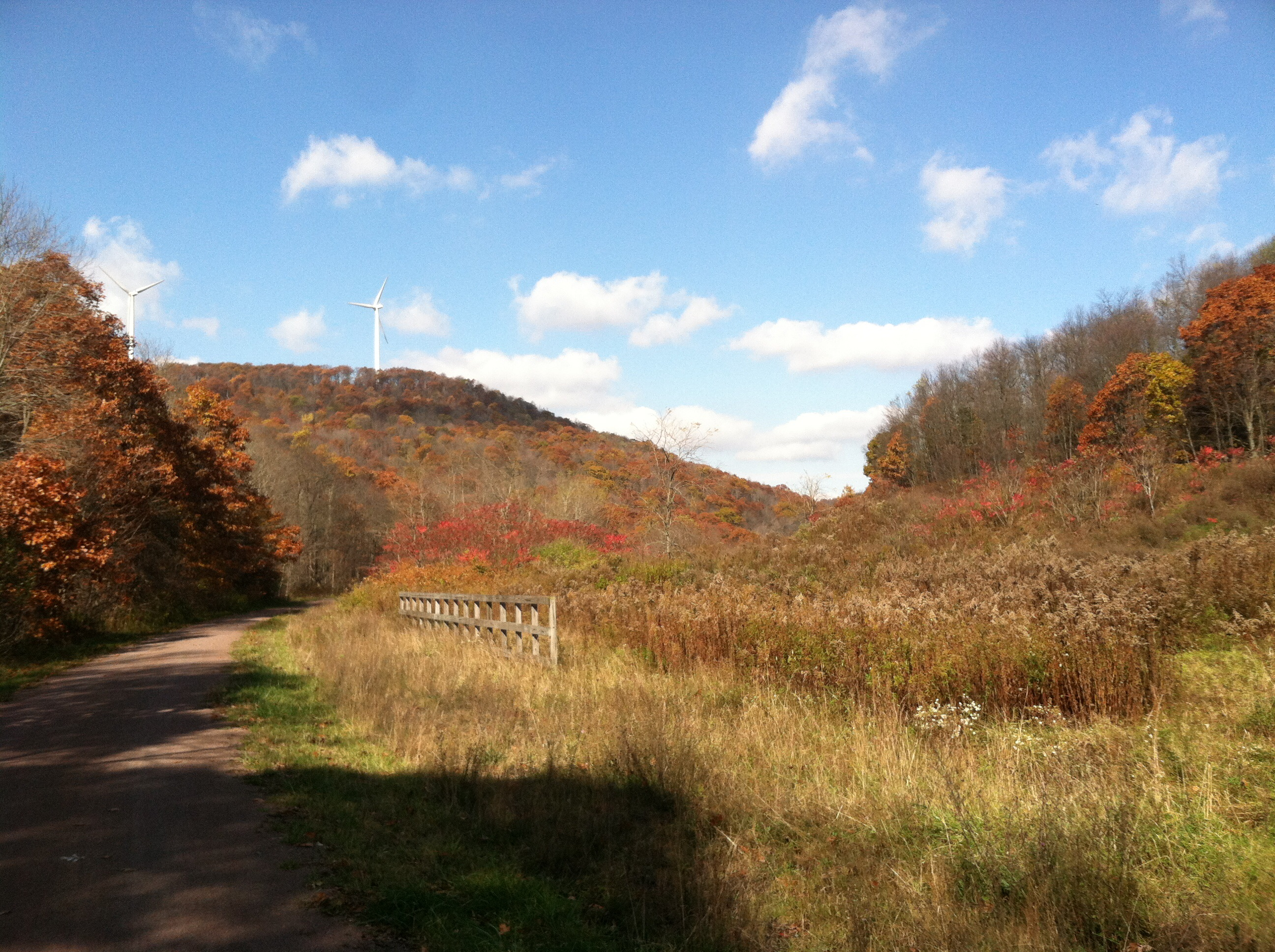
The Great Allegheny Passage in fall view of wind turbines

The GAP's route is composed of several shorter trails including the Allegheny Highlands Trail of Maryland, Allegheny Highlands Trail of Pennsylvania, Youghiogheny River Trail, Steel Valley Trail, and Three Rivers Heritage Trail. The GAP also includes the Montour Trail, a 52-mile (84 km) branch that serves Pittsburgh International Airport.

The segment of the GAP between Ohiopyle and Cumberland is part of the Potomac Heritage National Scenic Trail, one of eight nationally designated scenic trails. It is also part of the September 11th National Memorial Trail.

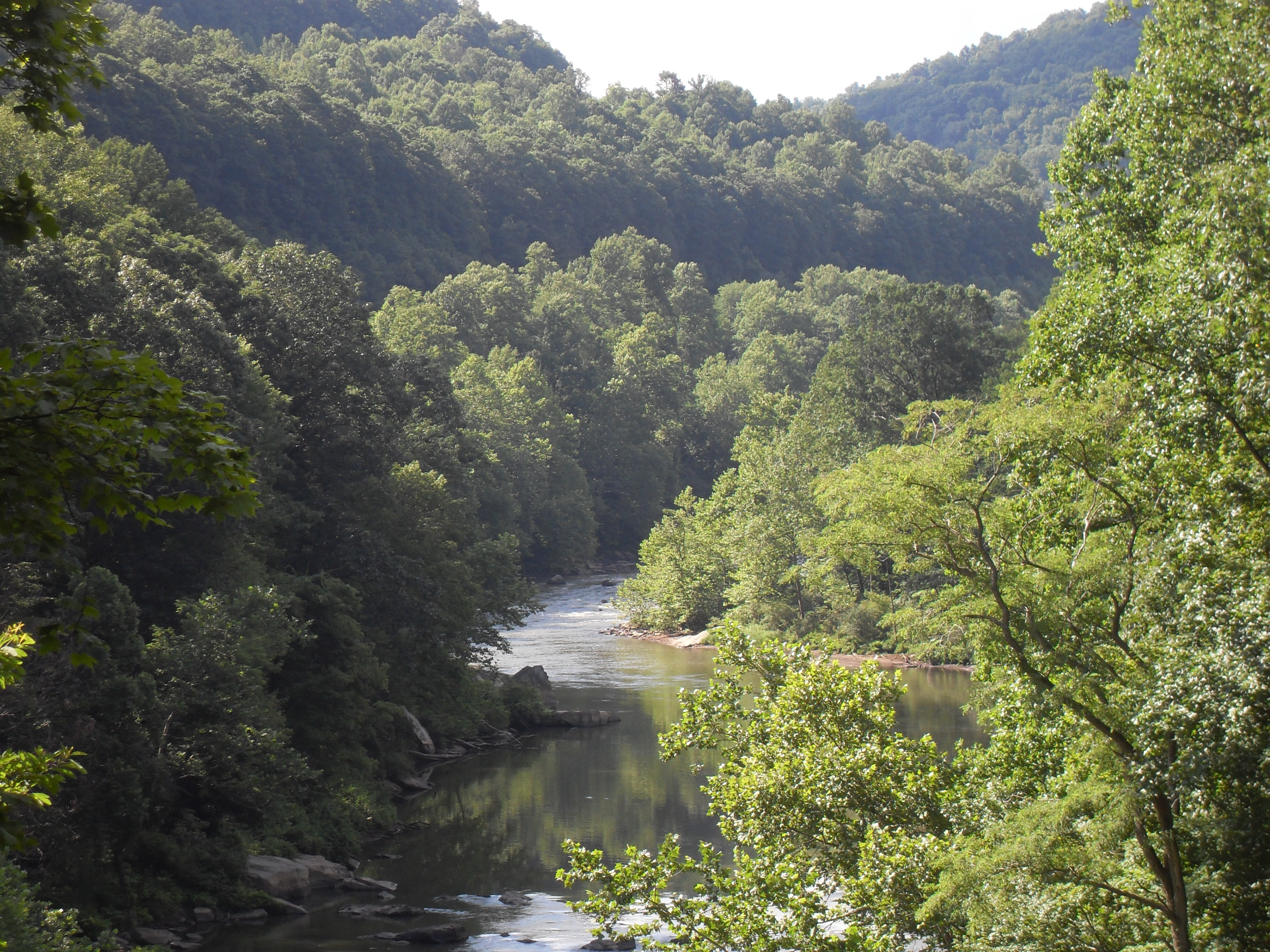
View of gorge from bike path

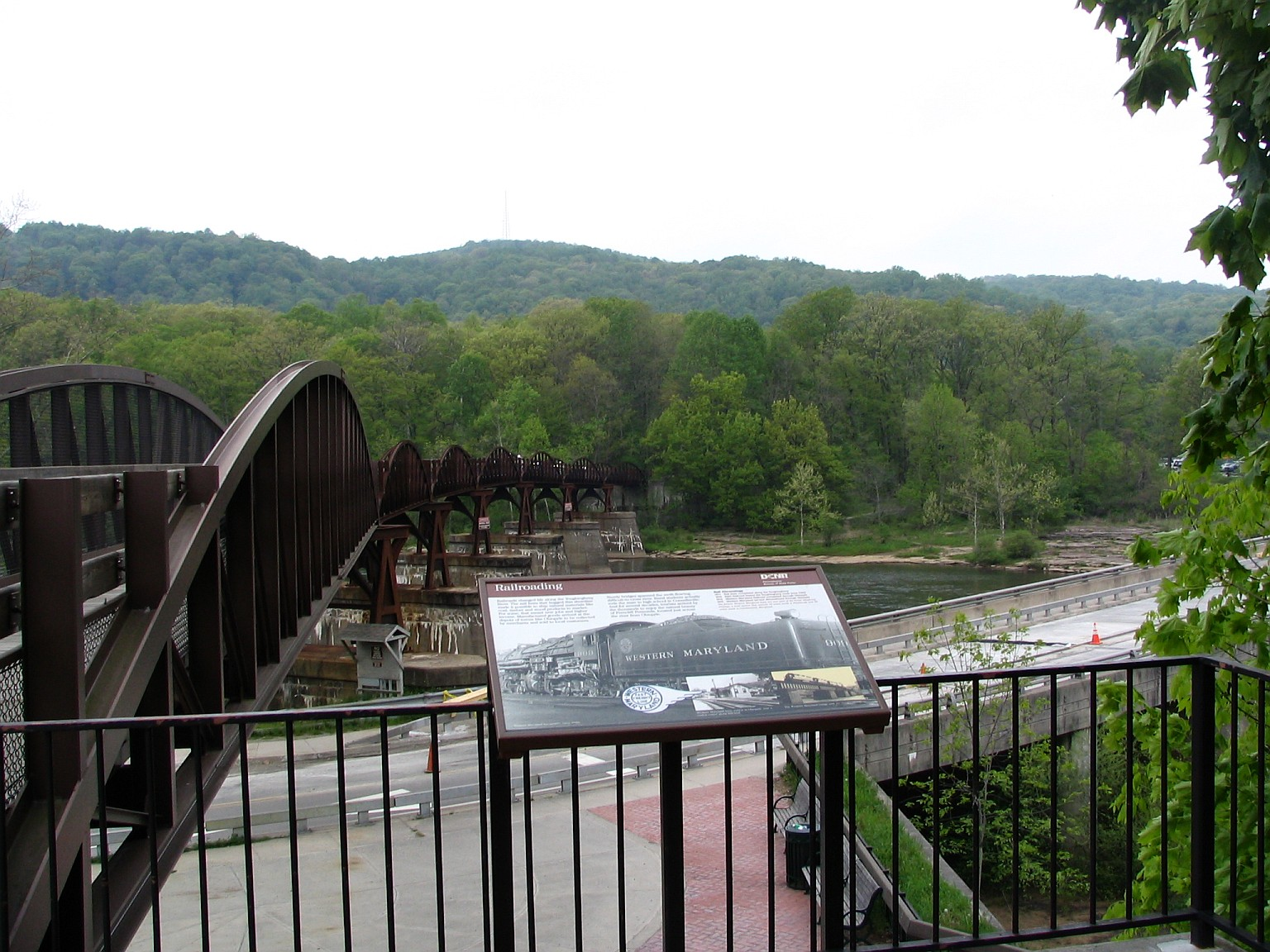
Ohiopyle Low Bridge, part of the Great Allegheny Passage

=== Points of interest ===
Notable landmarks along the GAP include:

- Point State Park in downtown Pittsburgh, where the Allegheny River meets the Monongahela River to form the Ohio River
- Carrie Furnace, part of the Steel Valley Heritage Trail, along the Monongahela River.
- The pumphouse where the Homestead strike culminated in a battle between strikers and private security in the middle of the night
- Kennywood amusement park near Duquesne, Pennsylvania; this section of the trail was restricted during September 2013 due to a landslide.
- Riverton Bridge (railroad) over the Monongahela River between Duquesne, Pennsylvania and McKeesport, Pennsylvania.
- Dead Man's Hollow, former site of the Union Sewer Pipe Company located outside of McKeesport, Pennsylvania, now a 440-acre nature preserve and spur trail
- Dravo Cemetery, originally the Seneca tribe's village known as Cyrie, later the home of the Dravo Methodist Church and Cemetery. Now a popular camping area and rest spot near Buena Vista, Pennsylvania.
- Connellsville trestles, 2 long bridges near Connellsville, Pennsylvania
- Ohiopyle State Park, bisected by the Youghiogheny, the most popular whitewater destination on the east coast.
- Fallingwater, a national architectural landmark designed by Frank Lloyd Wright. Located very close to the trail, but not accessible from it.
- Pinkerton Trestles and Tunnel, a trestle, 849 feet (259 m) long tunnel (unlighted; reopened in 2015) and trestle between the Markleton and Fort Hill trailheads
- Salisbury Viaduct, 1,908 feet (0.4 mi; 0.6 km), up to 100 feet (30 m) high across the Casselman River valley
- Meyersdale, Pennsylvania Museum
- Keystone Viaduct, east of Meyersdale, Pennsylvania
- Bollman Truss Bridge in Meyersdale, one of the two surviving cast-iron truss bridges in North America
- the Eastern Continental Divide, the highest point of the trail, passes through a short tunnel with murals of the area's history and a map of the trail's elevation contours.
- Big Savage Tunnel, 3,295 feet (0.6 mi; 1.0 km), the lighted tunnel carries the trail through Big Savage Mountain two miles east of the Eastern Continental Divide with a scenic vista just east of the tunnel—closed December 1 to April 1 for protection from seasonal snow and ice. Approximate dates, based on seasonal conditions. No easy road bypass.
- Mason–Dixon line: where the trail crosses the Pennsylvania - Maryland state border
- Borden Tunnel: 957 feet (292 m) long, lighted.
- Western Maryland Scenic Railroad, a working steam railroad operating next to the trail from Cumberland, Maryland to the college town of Frostburg, Maryland (and return), along the original trackage of the Western Maryland Railway.
- Brush Tunnel: 914 feet (279 m) long, lighted; the trail and the Western Maryland Scenic Railroad share this tunnel and pass through it side-by-side.
- Cumberland Bone Cave: (two or three miles west of Cumberland, Maryland: an archeological site containing bones of saber-toothed cats and other extinct animals, discovered during construction of the railroad.
- Canal Place, the head of the Chesapeake and Ohio Canal (C&O) in Cumberland, Maryland, where the C&O meets the former Western Maryland Railway (WM) and rail-trail.

== See also ==
- Chesapeake and Ohio Canal National Historical Park
- Ohio River Trail
- Erie to Pittsburgh Trail
- List of rail trails in Pennsylvania
- List of mountain biking areas and trails in Pennsylvania
