= Big Savage Mountain =

Mountain in the United States

Highest point
- Elevation: MD: 2,982 feet (909 m); PA: 2,566 feet (782 m)
- Coordinates: MD: 39°32′39″N 79°05′46″W; PA: 39°47′40″N 78°49′47″W

Geography
- Location: Allegany / Garrett counties, Maryland; Somerset County, Pennsylvania
- Parent range: Savage Mountain ridge

The two Big Savage Mountain (Maryland and Pennsylvania) summits are part of Savage Mountain. The peak of Big Savage Mountain in Maryland is High Rock, at 2986 feet.
