= Borden Tunnel =

Abandoned railway tunnel

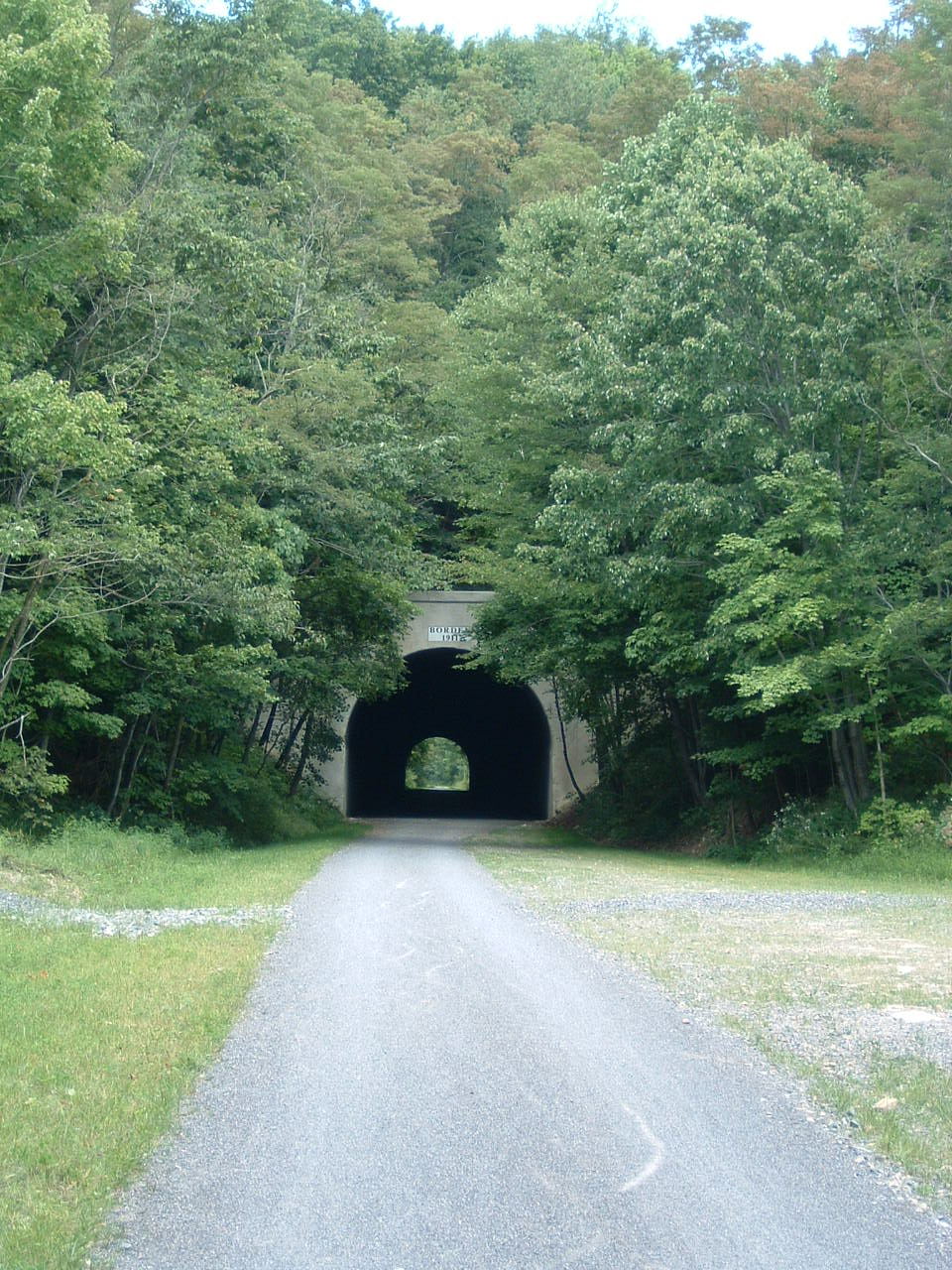
- Borden Tunnel
- Interactive map of Borden Tunnel

Overview
- Location: Allegany County, near Frostburg, Maryland
- Coordinates: 39°41′19″N 78°55′08″W
- Status: Restored, converted to rail trail
- System: Western Maryland Railway (defunct)

Operation
- Opened: 1911
- Closed: 1975 (rail line abandoned)

Technical
- Length: 957.5 ft (291.8 m)
- No. of tracks: Double
- Track gauge: 1,435 mm (4 ft 8 1/2 in) standard gauge
- Max elevation: 2036 ft (621 m)
- Grade: 1.7%

The Borden Tunnel is a 957-foot long, formerly abandoned, railway tunnel located about 2.5 miles (4 km) north of Frostburg, Maryland. The tunnel is lit with a series of motion activated LED lights powered by a solar panel located just north of the tunnel. It is now part of the Great Allegheny Passage rail trail.

The Western Maryland Railway built the tunnel in 1911 for its Connellsville Subdivision. The rail line was abandoned in 1975.
